= Mayflower grenade attack =

2008 grenade attack in Belize

- Location: 17.49783°N 88.19773°W; Mayflower & Vernon Streets, Belize City, Belize
- Date: 18 May 2008 ca 8:40 pm CT
- Attack type: Grenade attack
- Deaths: 1
- Injuries: 11
- Motive: Gang retaliation (alleged)
- Accused: 2
- Verdict: Not guilty
- Convicted: 0

The Mayflower grenade attack (Note: Also Mayflower Street grenade attack.) was an allegedly gang-related attack perpetrated in the evening of 18 May 2008 in Mayflower Street in Southside Belize City. A lone cyclist lobbed a live Czechoslovak M40 grenade at a group of people who were socialising streetside, leaving sixteen year old Darren Trapp fatally injured, and a further eleven others injured. Two suspects were arrested, charged, and tried for the attack, but were subsequently acquitted. The attack is deemed the first mass casualty event via explosive device in the Belize's history, and is thought to have prompted further grenade attacks in Southside Belize City (likewise allegedly by gangs).

== Background ==
A boom in violence and organised crime in Southside Belize City followed the introduction and adoption of Bloods and Crips gangs into the area by US deportees in the 1980s, not yet mitigated by the 2000s. By April 2008, the country had already seen 29 murders that year, including the Putt Putt mass shooting in Southside on 8 February, with Assistant Commissioner of Police Crispin Jeffries noting, "the cycle of violence that we are seeing needs urgent attention [...] the number of incidents of violent crimes, particularly in the deeper part of the Southside of Belize City, is becoming unbearable". Mayflower was an especially violent area of the already-dangerous Southside, with Jeffries claiming any statistical analysis would reveal it as the single deadliest street for young people in the last two decades.

== Attack ==
At circa 8:40 pm CT on 18 May 2008, a male subject on a bicycle approached a group of young people socialising in the Bailar portion of Mayflower Street (corner with Vernon Street) in Southside Belize City. (Note: 7 News 2008s; News 5 2008f. They had spent the day at the Agriculture and Trade Show, and usually hung out in this spot (7 News 2008t).) The subject hurled a small object at the group. (Note: 7 News 2008s. From Mendoza's Automotive Electric Supplies on Vernon Street (Amandala 2008j). Suspect was of fair complexion, wearing a green-and-white striped shirt, and black baseball cap (Amandala 2008j).) Thinking the Czechoslovak M40 grenade was a rock, one of the group (sixteen year old Darren Trapp) kicked it back to the hurler, triggering the explosion. The defensive grenade released a barrage of pellets, usually lethal within 11 yards (10 metres) of the blast. The shockwave shattered windows and shook nearby homes. The suspect sped off to Central American Boulevard via Pine and Ebony Streets. Policemen and soldiers at a police booth on Vernon Street (a few yards from the attack) chased on foot but could not reach the cycling suspect. Victims were rushed to Karl Heusner Memorial Hospital.

== Aftermath ==
The attack resulted in the death of sixteen year old Darren Trapp, and injuries to eleven others. (Note: News 5 2017a; 7 News 2008r. Injured survivors were Neria Wolcock (29), Ervin James (20), Kyle Chaplin (16), Triston Gordon (16), Kendis Flowers (16), Tyron Meighan (15), Darrel Myvette (25), Charles Young (18), Jamal Neal (16), Teddy Reyes (20), Sheriff Smith (15) (7 News 2008t; News 5 2008f; Amandala 2008j). Injuries sustained were penetrating wounds to legs, face, neck, hands, shoulders, and abdomen (7 News 2008t, News 5 2008f). Teddy Reyes remained in critical condition by 19 May (News 5 2008f); he spent "just over a month" in KHMH (7 News 2008o). Darren Trapp died around 1 am on 19 May; he had been admitted with a severed leg, a missing eye, and head trauma (News 5 2008f).) A survivor compared the explosion's aftermath to that of a warzone. (Note: They're on the ground trembling, you understand? It's like Iraq, a war, it's like a war. You know how you [newsmen] say men get blown up in explosions, like in Iraq? [...] somebody's foot came off and all [...] It was an ugly sight, Miss. — News 5 2017a) KHMH were forced to call in 20 extra staffers to deal with the emergency. Conscious Youth Development Programme personnel met with victims' families on 19 May. (Note: News 5 2008f; 7 News 2008t. Affected grenade blast area on Mayflower Street rehabilitated by CYDP and victims' families by January 2009 (7 News 2009d).) Youth for the Future held a peace rally on 23 May.

Police believed the attack was gang retaliation for a prior unreported shooting in St Martin de Porres. They promptly increased mobile patrols and conducted random searches across the city. Kareem Smith (20) and his brother, Akeem Smith (16), were arrested and charged for the attack on 23 May, with the latter identified as the alleged perpetrator. Both were acquitted. The Ministry of National Security (now Home Affairs) and the Police Department unveiled a revamped plan to combat crime on 11 August. (Note: 7 News 2008m. With a "gang crackdown" focussing especially on Mayflower Street (7 News 2008m). It [Mayflower] has long been an area where the police can only go in, and has difficulty at times getting out. [...] It has never been an area which we've taken the serious will to correct. [...] Mayflower Street has yielded the most single-street deaths among young people over the last 20 years. Any statistical analysis will show you that. And it will not decrease unless we do something more positive than we are doing right now. — ACP Crispin Jeffries, 7 News 2008m) After a British L109A1 grenade was lobbed at Carnival goers on Princess Margaret Drive on 6 September 2008 (sans detonation), Prime Minister Dean Barrow and the Police Department promised new operational and legislative measures "to deal with this grenade phenomenon". (Note: 7 News 2008i; News 5 2008d; News 5 2008b. A nine-point crime-fighting strategy was unveilled by police on 28 January 2009, based on the recent Crooks Report (7 News 2009c).)

The attack was followed by a second one with a British L109A1 grenade (from BATSUB) on 28 December 2009 on Kraal Road (corner with Haynes Street), resulting in the death of fourteen year old Rudolph Flowers, and injuries to two others. (Note: News 5 2017a; 7 News 2009u; 7 News 2009v; 7 News 2009w; 7 News 2009a. But a half pound of British PE4 explosives recovered in a private residence on Berkeley and Plues Streets on 23 June 2008 (7 News 2008p). A Czechoslovak M40 grenade was recovered on 2 August 2008 (7 News 2008n). Another Czechoslovak M40 grenade was recovered on 4 September 2008 in Port Loyola (7 News 2008l; 7 News 2008k). A British L109A1 grenade (from BATSUB) was hurled at Carnival goers on 6 September 2008 near KHMH on Princess Margaret Drive, but did not explode (News 5 2008e; 7 News 2008j; 7 News 2008h). Another British L109A1 grenade (from BATSUB too) detonated in Yarborough (Caesar Ridge and Old Faber's Roads) on 14 November 2008, sans casualties (7 News 2008g; Amandala 2008f; Amandala 2008e). And yet another British L109A1 grenade detonated in Belama Phase One (at the Comptroller of Customs' home on Signa Yorke Street) on 3 March 2009, sans casualties (Amandala 2009c; 7 News 2009b).) By 2017, sixteen grenades had been discovered and removed from Southside Belize City, with two of those having produced casualties.

== Legacy ==
The attack is remembered as the first mass casualty event via explosive device in the country's history (including military history). (Note: News 5 2017a; Amandala 2008j. But Mjr David Jones (BDF senior bomb disposal technician) noted "this is not the first time such a weapon [grenade] has been found in Belize as the same type was used in an incident at Mile 42 on the Western Highway approximately seven years ago [ca 2001]" (News 5 2008f). Similarly, ACP Crispin Jeffries noted in September 2008 "for as many as 10 years, police have known of grenades being on the streets" (Amandala 2008g).) 7 News deemed it "an act of urban terror". (Note: It is a crime that has stunned the city– even in a community [Southside] that, to some extent is used to hearing of gun violence, this is another level. It is more than just another crime, it is an act of urban terror: against the residents of Mayflower Street and the wider community. Moreover, it is a dangerous escalation of the gang warfare in the streets. — 7 News 2008r After a grenade was lobbed at Carnival goers (no detonation) on 6 September 2008, 7 News similarly reiterated. As said at the top, everything has changed and whosoever didn’t know that on May 18th knows it tonight [September 8th]. The enormity of the crimes and the potential for violence of this literally cannot be overstated; it is the kind of thing that happens in countries like Israel, Iraq and formerly Ireland. But now it’s over here – except there is no holy war, no infidels, only Belizeans and a new type of urban terror. — 7 News 2008i) News 5 called it "a watershed occurrence". (Note: We’re not really sure how or why Belize changed from a relatively peaceful place into an extremely violent one, but when that history is written the events of Sunday night in Belize City may be cited as a watershed occurrence: when the staccato crackle of handguns was overshadowed by the thunder of a hand grenade. — News 5 2008f) Darren Trapp's mother, Sherette Jones, noted, "Belize is coming to an end". Amandala called it "a sudden plunge into a hellish dungeon of darkness", noting "the war out in the streets has taken on a new and uglier face". After a second grenade attack on 6 September 2008 (sans casualties), Prime Minister Dean Barrow noted "possession of a grenade or the facilitation of another’s possession of a grenade has to be seen now as a kind of urban terrorism". Leader of the Opposition John Briceno similarly condemned the violent behaviour and senseless killings.

The attack has been interpreted as an example of a gang seeking to outdo their rivals, with later grenade attacks seen as attempts by the latter to restore equilibrium. In an episode of Ross Kemp on Gangs (focussing on Belize City gangs; premiered in early September 2008), Ross Kemp noted, "in all my travels around the world, I've never seen a gang with this kind of hardware" when an alleged gangmember handed him a NATO hand grenade. Herbert Gayle, a UWI anthropologist who had been studying gang violence in Belize since 2004, cautioned that gangs might escalate to something deadlier than grenades, as they had from knives to guns and guns to grenades in years prior. (Note: 7 News 2008f. Gang violence in Belize has taken a sharp turn [...] over, say, the last five, six years, [...] What you find happening is that we've moved from knives, guns, grenades, and these gangs will ask, 'which one is more graphic?', 'who is the badder man now?' And the question has to be asked: What is the next step from grenades? — H Gayle, anthropologist, 7 News 2008f) A 2010 ABA report noted the attack "awakened Belizean society to its lack of knowledge about social violence and the lack of training in advanced research tools needed to study the problem of juvenile crime". The attack prompted Nelma Mortis (Ministry of Education) to collaborate with Gayle on a study of why so many urban youth engaged in gang violence, completed in 2010. (Note: Amandala 2010a; University of the West Indies 2015. Published in Gayle 2010a and Gayle 2016b.)

== See also ==
- List of gangs in Belize
- Crips–Bloods gang war – ongoing in Belize and elsewhere

== Notes and references ==
=== References ===
1. "Police launch Operation Cycle Breaker". 7 News. 3 April 2008.
2. "2008's 29 murder – a murder every three days!!". Amandala. 8 April 2008.
3. "Grenade attack killed 1, injured 11". 7 News. 19 May 2008.
4. "Grenade attack was gang retaliation". 7 News. 19 May 2008.
5. "Urban terror: Deadly grenade blast rocks Mayflower Street". 7 News. 19 May 2008.
6. "One dead, eleven injured by grenade tossed into crowd". News 5. 19 May 2008.
7. "Grenade carnage on Mayflower!". Amandala. 20 May 2008.
8. "Mayflower (May 18) and Putt Putt (February 8) – Exactly 100 days are up!". Amandala. 20 May 2008.
9. "Youths rally for peace". 7 News. 23 May 2008.
10. "Smith brothers charged for Mayflower Street grenade attack". Amandala. 29 May 2008.
11. "Police find deadly PE 4 explosive in Belize City". 7 News. 23 June 2008.
12. "Grenade attack left 17 holes in Teddy Reyes' body". 7 News. 25 June 2008.
13. "Police strike deal with Raymond Gentle to get grenade off the street". 7 News. 4 August 2008.
14. "Police unveil plan to combat crime". 7 News. 11 August 2008.
15. "Another grenade found in the City". 7 News. 4 September 2008.
16. "More grenades on the street". 7 News. 5 September 2008.
17. "Grenade hurled at hundreds of carnival onlookers". News 5. 8 September 2008.
18. "Urban terror: Live grenade thrown into crowded area". 7 News. 8 September 2008.
19. "PM Dean Barrow will legislate against acts of urban terror". 7 News. 8 September 2008.
20. "The grenade came from BATSUB". 7 News. 9 September 2008.
21. "Police reveal initiatives to bolster safer streets". News 5. 9 September 2008.
22. "PUP leader condemns violence in the streets". News 5. 9 September 2008.
23. "Carnival Day's grenade scare puts damper on 10th parade". News 5. 11 September 2008.
24. "Belize gang documentary sensational on Internet!". Amandala. 19 September 2008.
25. "Another grenade explodes in Belize City". 7 News. 17 November 2008.
26. "The city's third grenade goes off!". Amadala. 18 November 2008.
27. "BATSUB grenade exploded in Yarborough two weeks ago". Amandala. 28 November 2008.
28. "Generation Violence". 7 News. 8 December 2008.
29. "2008 in review part II – May to August". Amandala. 29 December 2008.
30. "Mothers cleaning up and filling up on Mayflower Street". 7 News. 14 January 2009.
31. "Police launch 9 point crime fighting strategy". 7 News. 28 January 2009.
32. "Comptroller Gibson's home attacked with grenade!". Amandala. 5 March 2009.
33. "PM Dean Barrow comments on grenade attack on Customs Comptroller's house". 7 News. 10 March 2009.
34. "Deadly grenade attack on Kraal Road". 7 News. 29 December 2009.
35. "Grenade blast killed 1, injured 2, shook all". 7 News. 29 December 2009.
36. "Grenade was of British origin". 7 News. 29 December 2009.
37. "18 grenades still on the streets". 7 News. 30 December 2009.
38. "Carrying water in a basket". Amandala. 27 July 2010.
39. Gayle H, Mortis N (2010). Male Social Participation and Violence in Urban Belize (Report). Belize City: MOE.
40. Assessment of Juvenile Justice in Belize (Report). Washington, DC: ABA. 2010. ISBN 978-1-61632-822-1.
41. "Research". UWI. 27 January 2015.
42. Gayle H, Hampton V, Mortis N (2016). Like Bush Fire. Benque Viejo, Belize: Cubola. ISBN 978-976-8161-47-5.
43. "The impact of grenade finds and explosions in Old Capital". News 5. 16 January 2017.
44. Warnecke-Berger H (2018). Politics and Violence in Central America and the Caribbean. Cham, Switzerland: Palgrave Macmillan. doi:10.1007/978-3-319-89782-0. ISBN 978-3-319-89782-0.
