= Gangs in Belize =

Organised crime gangs

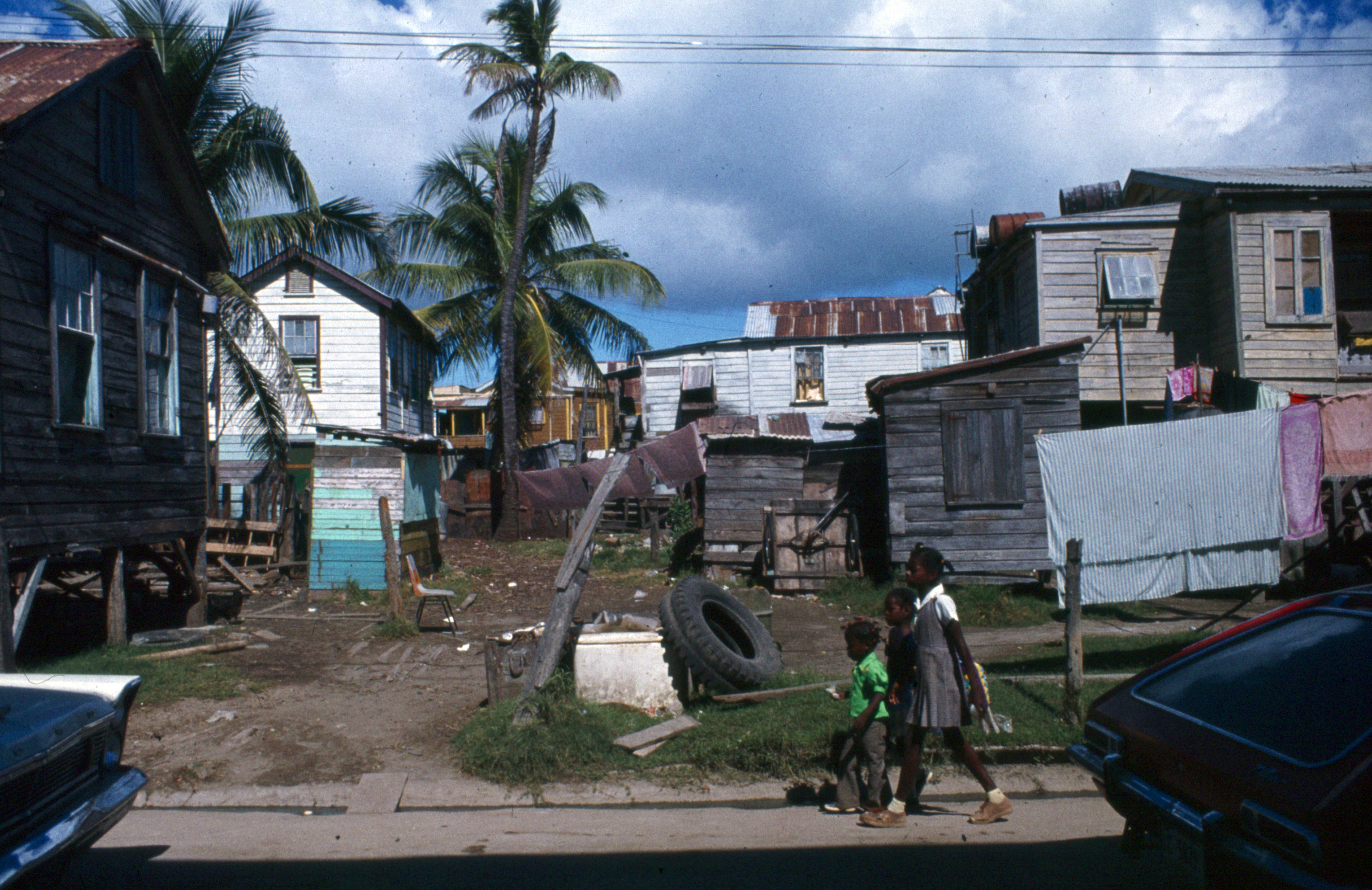
Urban poverty is deemed a primary reason why Belizean youth join gangs

An estimated 900 to 1,400 people in Belize were part of street gangs as of 2019, with some three dozen gangs active in the country. These gangs were formed in the 1980s in Southside Belize City, as offshoots of the American Bloods and Crips gangs. Most gangs in Belize remain based in the Southside, and retain at least loose affiliation with Bloods or Crips. They are widely deemed primarily responsible for sustained waves of violent, gun, and organised crime in the country since the 1990s, still unabated in the 2020s.

== History ==
=== Rise of gangs ===
In the 1960s, the economic devastation wrought by Hurricane Hattie (especially in Belize City) prompted scores of Belizeans to emigrate to America, resulting in a sizeable overseas diaspora (especially in Chicago, Los Angeles, New York). (Note: Home Affairs 2007, p. 4; Gayle 2010a, p. 308; Smith 1998, p. 277; Brotherton 2021, p. 388; Warnecke 2019, pp. 88–89; New York Daily Post 1997; Janowitz 2021. Belizeans had first mass emigrated to America to fill labour shortages during WWII (Smith 1998, pp. 274–275). About half of them stayed back after the war, and an estimated average of 1,400 to 1,600 per annum joined them over 1950–1990 (Smith 1998, p. 275).) Belizean emigrants to LA were there embraced by the budding Bloods and Crips street gangs, and subsequently spread them to Belize during holidays back home, or upon their deportation. (Note: Home Affairs 2007, p. 4; Gayle 2010a, pp. 308–309; Smith 1998, pp. 270–272; Janowitz 2021. The accent, the jargon, the mixture of bravado and nihilism, the talk of gangs, street fights, drugs and muggings [of/by Big Russian, LA deportee and local Bloods member] -- all recalled the mean streets and troubled neighborhoods of Los Angeles. But the scene was this sleepy Caribbean port city [Belize City] in a country that has been a bastion of tranquility through years of war, economic dislocation and social unrest in the rest of Central America. "Bloods," "Crips" and crack cocaine have come to Belize, and authorities seem powerless to do much about it. — William Branigin, WaPo journalist, in 1989, Branigin 1989 While Belize exports people to Los Angeles, it imports Bloods and Crips. Some Belizeans become gang members in Los Angeles, then return home in their new colors. They become a new "family" option for many street youth whose parents have gone to Southern California. Some act as couriers for cocaine flown from Colombia to Los Angeles. Crack cocaine addiction is prevalent for the first time. Guns are shipped from Los Angeles to the streets of Belize City. Shootouts and funerals follow, unprecedented in Belizean history. — Tom Hayden, CA State Senator, in 1995, Hayden 1995)

Locals promptly took to the novel American gangs, ostensibly due to media influence. The local 1970s premiere of The Wild Bunch, for instance, was credited as Belize's "first exposure to criminal street gang activities" by Home Affairs personnel. A group of impressionable youths allegedly began "cop[ying] the behaviour [they had] seen in the movie", dubbing themselves the Wild Bunch. (Note: Home Affairs 2007, p. 4. They eventually assaulted and seriously injured a law enforcement officer, resulting in their prosecution and subsequent incarceration or emigration (Home Affairs 2007, p. 4). Basketball icon Clinton Lightburn noted, "there was a thin line between basketball and being a gang member because I grew up [in the 70s] in the streets with one of the first gangs, called the Wild Bunch" (News 5 2025a).) The 1980s introduction of television (especially American programming) and premiere of Colors are also cited as inspiring locals to embrace street gangs. (Note: Home Affairs 2007, p. 5; Rotenberg 1993, p. 117; Wilk 1993, pp. 235–236; Warnecke 2019, pp. 210, 212; Branigin 1989; New York Daily Post 1997; Janowitz 2021. Colors is especially cited (Warnecke 2019, p. 212). Rotenberg 1993 state, "it is undeniable that the gang craze 'exploded' after the showing of Colors in 1988" (p. 117). Brotherton 2021 note the 1991 Boyz n the Hood "became the cultural signifier for Belizean gang activity" (p. 390).)

In addition to priming via media, the rise of gangs is further attributed to increased arrivals of US deportees from LA, and US-instigated eradication of cannabis farms, both in the 1980s. (Note: Rotenberg 1993, p. 117; Amandala 2007a; Duran 2024, p. 22; Pyrooz 2024, p. 360; Warnecke 2019, pp. 210–212; George 1993; Janowitz 2021. Local cannabis farming is thought to have begun in the 1960s, and intensified after Mexican cannabis eradication, such that by the early 1980s, Belizean cannabis exports (Belizean Breeze) totalled "more than 40 percent of GDP", making Belize the hemisphere's fourth largest cannabis producer (Warnecke 2019, pp. 200, 207; Branigin 1989; Otis 1991).) The deportee-gang members founded the country's first Bloods (George Street) and Crips (Majestic Alley) gangs, while the eradication programme forced a switch to imported cocaine. (Note: Home Affairs 2007, p. 5; Rotenberg 1993, pp. 106, 117; Amandala 2007a; Gayle 2010a, p. 309; Brotherton 2021, pp. 388–389; Warnecke 2019, p. 200; Branigin 1989; Otis 1991; Janowitz 2021. Amandala 2007a date the arrival of cocaine to the introduction of discos in the mid 1970s, but still blame cannabis eradication for the ensuing mass adoption of crack-cocaine. Brotherton 2021 date the first arrival of LA gangs to Belize to 1981, "arguably making them the first experience of gang transnationalism in the entire region" (p. 388). I had my aunty here [...] in Majestic Alley. First we were selling weed; crack-cocaine hadn't even touched Belize. I started selling and just hustling, whatever, just to make a buck. There weren't gangs then, just guys who hung out and tried to hustle. There weren't really any guns; we used to chase our enemies with stick and machete [...] Only the big people would have guns. The cocaine came in [about 19]85. [...] Then men came to trade guns for crack, guns for weed. [...] My friend started acting [like a] real gangster, the way America does it. He's the one that decided that Majestic Alley would be blue [Crips], and anything over the Swing Bridge [would be] red [Bloods] in [19]87–88. We used to fight at the local disco; if you [were] from over the bridge, we'd pick a fight with you, with knife and machete. They were serious fights, but not really with guns. — Angel (first local Crips leader; deported from LA in 1981), Brotherton 2021, p. 388) As a result, by the late 1980s and early 1990s the said street gangs were well-established, with "youths claiming to be members of the Crips and the Bloods [and] fighting over colours and turf". (Note: Home Affairs 2007, p. 5; Rotenberg 1993, pp. 106, 110, 116, 118; Amandala 2007a; Brotherton 2021, pp. 388–389; Warnecke 2019, pp. 212–213; Branigin 1989; Janowitz 2021. Brotherton 2021 note the first gang leaders "were proactive, distributing Blue or Red rags and bandanas and handing out money and weapons to ‘protect’ gang members from the rivals that, ironically, they had discursively created on the streets" (p. 389).)

Initially, the official line by authorities was dismissive, claiming self-identified Bloods and Crips were "not real gang members, but only [people who] use the name". (Note: Rotenberg 1993, p. 117; Branigin 1989.) As gang violence became more violent and visible, however, police (and even soldiers) were forced to act despite this official denialism. The 1990 muggings and beatings of school children who had failed to pay protection money, for instance, prompted increased patrols and periodic sweeps, though these provided only brief respite, with said sweeps (like Operation Thunder) being "from a civil rights standpoint, highly questionable". (Note: Rotenberg 1993, p. 117. In 1990, 64 percent of Belize City households surveyed had experienced a robbery or some form of violent assault against one of their own that year, per a UCB poll (Rotenberg 1993, p. 119). By 1993, the prison population had so overwhelmed Central Prison that it had to be relocated from Belize City to its barely-completed site in Hattieville (Gayle 2010a, p. 145). On the other hand, by the 1980s, baseboys were already "being hassled" by Babylon boops (police) (Rotenberg 1993, p. 115). And by the 2000s, police were already infamous for their corruption, abuses, brutality, and alleged unlawful killings, with the Gayle Report noting they "operate like gangs", and circa 90 percent of complaints to the Ombudsman regarding police (Gayle 2010a, pp. 136–137). According to the same, police had so brutalised urban youth that by the late 2000s the latter "really want[ed] an outright war with them like in Jamaica – even if we lose", and yet interviewed gang members deemed police gangs' "best friends", given their corruptibility (Gayle 2010a, pp. 136–137, 320–324). These findings still held in the 2020s in Young 2023b, pp. 11–13.) Similarly, the 1991 drive-by shooting and murder of a student (alleged Crip) at Excelsior High in Port Loyola (in addition to a string of other notorious crimes) prompted a joint BPD-BDF operation "to take back the city streets" (the country's first deployment of military for domestic law enforcement) and a commission of inquiry (the Crimes Commission). (Note: Rotenberg 1993, p. 120; Brotherton 2021, p. 391; Smith 1998, p. 270. Police also started being militarised. For instance, still by 1991, "police carr[ied] only billy clubs unless assigned to potentially dangerous raids" (Otis 1991). Now (2020s), guns are standard issue.)

=== Outbreak of gang-banging ===
The "most visible initial event" portending the coming gang warfare came in 1992, with the murder of Derek Itza Brown (Crips leader) at the National Stadium in Belize City, and retaliatory murder of Lyndon Tunan Arnold (Bloods leader) in New York City. (Note: Amandala 2007a; Warnecke 2019, p. 214.) The ensuing violence spurred a quick about-face by authorities, prompting the country's earliest parliamentary response to gangs (Crime Control & Criminal Justice Act 1992) and first gang truce (1995 Bird's Isle agreement). (Note: Duran 2024, pp. 19–27; Young 2023b, p. 3; Smith 1998, pp. 270, 284; New York Daily Post 1997. Truce modelled after prior LA truces, mediated by government, prompted by Crips (Ghost Town) gang leader George Junie Balls McKenzie, soon crumbled as funding dried up (Duran 2024, pp. 22–24, 26).)

By the 2000s, efforts in Colombia and elsewhere had largely succeeded in blocking maritime cocaine traffic through the Caribbean Sea, leaving Central America (including Belize) as the only viable route to the US. (Note: Gayle 2010a, pp. 47–48, 309. By 2006, an estimated 90 percent of US-bound South American cocaine transited Central America (Gayle 2010a, p. 47). By 2009, the isthmus ranked as the most violent region in the world (Gayle 2010a, p. 46).) Gang activity in Belize thus ramped up, and grew even more visible and violent. (Note: Home Affairs 2007, pp. 9–10. Gayle 2010a further claim it grew more organised upon the arrival of 27 Rolling 30s members from NYC (arrested 1997, served prison time, then deported; p. 309). Home Affairs 2007 state "they [Rolling 30s] quickly established their bases [upon arrival in Belize] and introduced new subcultural behaviours among their associates" (p. 5). But Brotherton 2021 find gang activity grew less organised (and thus more violent) in the 2000s as gangs rapidly fragmented (pp. 386, 391–393).) For instance, 2008 alone saw both the Putt Putt mass shooting (most casualties) and Mayflower grenade attack (first such). By 2009, the country's murder rate had doubled from the already-dizzying 16 per 100,000 rate in 2000.

The worsening situation in the 2000s now necessitated serious, concerted effort by authorities. (Note: By 2007, Home Affairs deemed gangs a "threat to national security" (Home Affairs 2007, pp. 9, 11).) Various attempts were then made to understand and address the problem of gang violence, including studies (Crooks, Gayle), preventative and rehabilitative programmes (Kolbe, Youth Cadets, YFF, CYDP, RESTORE Belize), policing reforms and operations (various), and parliamentary, judicial, and governmental measures (various). (Note: Gayle 2010a, pp. 130, 145–146, 157–158, 345–346; Home Affairs 2007, pp. 12–16.) Nevertheless, the spiralling crime wave continued into the 2010s and 2020s unabated, despite several attempts to address it, including three further gang truces. (Note: Duran 2024, pp. 19–22, 27–32; Warnecke 2019, pp. 219–220.) By 2023, "comprehensive and long-term intervention continue[d] to elude public and private efforts".

== Types and activities ==
The earliest "gangs" (like the Wild Bunch) were small crews or posses of mostly lower and working class Creole baseboys who appropriated bases (street corners, alleyways, playgrounds) in Belize City for the sale or use of ganja (cannabis) and for petty crime. (Note: Rotenberg 1993, pp. 115–116; Amandala 2007a; Brotherton 2021, pp. 388–389; Warnecke 2019, pp. 210–211. Possibly akin to Jamaican rude boy posses or Eastern Caribbean liming (Rotenberg 1993, p. 120).)

With the arrival of the Bloods and Crips, these disparate crews were purportedly coopted and consolidated into two large gangs, now properly street gangs composed of wanna-bes (baseboys) and true gang-bangers (experienced gang members). (Note: Rotenberg 1993, pp. 116–117; Brotherton 2021, p. 389.) By the early 1990s, these street gangs were seemingly being coopted by foreign drug traffickers to facilitate cocaine transshipment to America in exchange for arms (short arms and high-powered rifles) and a portion of the cargo (for local production, sale, and use of crack-cocaine). (Note: Home Affairs 2007, p. 10; Rotenberg 1993, p. 117; Amandala 2007a; Gayle 2010a, pp. 309, 311, 314–315, 318–319; Warnecke 2019, pp. 213–214; Branigin 1989; Otis 1991. Of 703 murders in 2002–2009 in Belize, 357 (51 percent) had been by firearms (which had become "a core indicator of gang violence"), versus 211 (30 percent) by knife or machete (Gayle 2010a, p. 284). By 2020, the portion of murders by firearm stood at circa two-thirds (Wallace 2022, p. 212). A 1990s gang leader noted "[in 19]85–86 [things] started to get worse, we started getting guns [and] Belize just got out of hand" (Duran 2024, p. 22). By 2023, a question on how difficult it was to acquire firearms was met "with derision and looks of amusement" by interviewed gang members, all of whom said it was "very easy" (Young 2023b, p. 13). On the other hand, Brotherton 2021 found gangs had been largely passed over by foreign traffickers by the mid 2010s (in favour of other local actors), though gangs still found other sources of arms and drugs (p. 392). Similarly, in 1991 Otis 1991 reported local cocaine traffickers were "mainly based in Orange Walk", but their activity nevertheless "led to a sharp rise in drug use and street crime in Belize City".) They were also engaging in extortion, for instance, by demanding protection money from locals, including school children. (Note: Rotenberg 1993, p. 117; Gayle 2010a, pp. 311–314. Gayle 2010a note gangs were providing protection sans prior extortion (pp. 311, 315–318).) Further activities included assaults, robberies, kidnappings, stabbings, shootings, homicides. (Note: Rotenberg 1993, pp. 117, 120; Gayle 2010a, pp. 311, 315; Pyrooz 2024, pp. 360–361; Brotherton 2021, p. 388; Otis 1991.) There have even been allegations of gangs doing the illicit bidding of local corrupt politicians. (Note: Pyrooz 2024, p. 360; Brotherton 2021, p. 389; Warnecke 2019, pp. 226–227. Amandala 2007a attributed "a period of crisis" in 2003 (when Crips began "to step on us [Amandala], me [the publisher] specifically") to influence "by a powerful faction of the ruling PUP" who wished to bring the paper "under manners". And Gayle 2010a noted, "it is very clear that some politicians who have symbiotic links with gangs [illicitly exert undue influence in favour of the latter]" (pp. 138–139, 144–145, 315–318). Further, some interviewees in Duran 2024 claimed "politicians used gangs for garnering votes and participating in electoral rallies" (p. 26).)

When the first street gangs began to splinter, the offshoots originally retained strong allegiances to (and so strong rivalries with) Bloods or Crips. By the turn of the century, however, gang fragmentation accelerated, and rivalries no longer seemed to follow the old Bloods versus Crips line. (Note: Amandala 2007a; Brotherton 2021, pp. 386, 391–393; Warnecke 2019, pp. 210, 220; Janowitz 2021. Gayle 2010a found "the turf war is usually between Crips and Bloods but occasionally, depending on the stimulus, intra-group factions occur" (p. 310). Brotherton 2021 found "homicide rates rose most dramatically as violence became less organised when the Bloods and Crips structures began to fragment" (p. 386). But Warnecke 2019 claim "Crips and Bloods gang identity never became hegemonic in the sense of co-opting existing base identities and forming two larger gang blocks" (p. 215).) And so "a new generation of gangs emerged" in the 2000s which were neither (or only nominally) Bloods or Crips. By the 2010s, the new gangs "look[ed] less to US gangsta iconography and more to Jamaican rude boy identities and music".

== Recruitment ==
Poor, urban, six to twenty-four year old boys not in schooling nor employment are thought to form gangs' core recruits. These boys are especially found in Southside Belize City. Their vulnerability to existing gang violence, poverty, and romanticisation of gangs, in addition to poor deterrence by authorities, have been cited as the primary reasons why youth join gangs, with the Gayle Report finding "boys join gangs because of the failings of the state and civil society". Thus, gangs remain (in fact and fiction) these boys' only recourse for much-needed safety and welfare. (Note: Gayle 2010a, pp. 126–127; Pyrooz 2024, p. 361; Young 2023b, p. 8; Brotherton 2021, p. 390; Warnecke 2019, p. 217.)

== Demographics ==
In the late 1980s and early 1990s, street gangs were a mix of inexperienced wanna-bes and experienced gang-bangers. The former were mostly lower and working class Creole boys, aged twelve to early twenties, many with no or little secondary schooling, and with emigrant parents. In 1989, one scholar estimated Bloods at some 300 and Crips at some 1,000 members, though the official Home Affairs estimate at the time was circa 75 members total. (Note: Rotenberg 1993, p. 117; Branigin 1989. Rotenberg 1993 note the former "are nearly impossible to confirm, however, and do not distinguish between hard-core members and supporters", whereas for the latter, "one only has to observe an all-too-frequent procession for a gang member's funeral to realise that the numbers are far higher than the total of seventy-five" (p. 117).)

In the 2000s, official (Home Affairs) estimates found street gangs averaged 10 to 15 members, were concentrated in Southside Belize City, and were deemed responsible for a majority of the country's shootings and gun homicides. Their members were predominantly 14 to 30 year old males, mostly from underprivileged or dysfunctional homes, with some being deportees themselves or else influenced by deportees. Also, "limited numbers" of Mestizos were found to be associated with MS 13 or 18th Street. The Gayle Report found gangs were predominantly present in Southside, with their ethnic makeup fairly reflecting that of the area (three-quarters Creole or Garifuna, and a quarter Mestizo, East Indian, or Maya). They further found most members were not employable, had relatives in gangs, and could be classed into shottas or greens or soldiers (inexperienced members in their teens or 20s) and dons or bosses or generals (experienced members in their 30s or older). (Note: Gayle 2010a, pp. 65, 306, 308, 310; Brotherton 2021, p. 389.) They conservatively estimated the tally of gangs at "just under 30", with 10 to 30 "hard core members" each.

Today (2020s), there are an estimated 900 to 1,400 gang members across some three dozen gangs, nearly all in Southside. (Note: Young 2023b, p. 1; Brotherton 2021, p. 394; Warnecke 2019, pp. 198, 215–216.) A 2023 snowball sample study found gang members were disproportionately school drop outs (despite overwhelmingly positive views towards education), were parents with generally positive views on the importance of parenting, had accumulated relatively little material wealth, and felt unjustly treated by law enforcement and the judiciary (but nonetheless viewed the institutions themselves as necessary for society).

== Legacy ==
The most immediate effect of gang activity has been an unabated boom in violent crime, which has surpassed levels deemed epidemic by WHO. (Note: Duran 2024, pp. 15–16; Pyrooz 2024, pp. 360–361; Young 2023b, pp. 1, 3–4, 14; Wallace 2022, pp. 211–212; Brotherton 2021, pp. 386, 396. Brotherton 2021 thus dub Belize "the forgotten fourth corner of the [Northern] triangle" (p. 387). But Warnecke 2019 point out that spikes in violent crime are not novel to Belize post-gangs, noting homicides for 1945–2015 peaked in 1983 and "already fluctuated well above" 20 per 100,000 in the 1950s (pp. 5–6). They nonetheless deem gangs "primary violent actors" who introduced "new forms of violence" (namely, urban, public, with guns, in positive feedback loops of escalating power struggles) (Warnecke 2019, pp. 209–210, 214–217).) Further notable impacts include a similarly unrelenting wave of organised crime, the corrosion of social and state institutions, negative health and education outcomes, and economic losses, among others.

Scholarly attention to Belizean gangs has been relatively sparse (compared to Jamaican, Mexican, and Northern Triangle groups), bar Nuri Muhammad's collection of essays in 1995 Insights Into Gang Culture in Belize: Essays on Youth, Crime and Violence but has nonetheless picked up since the 2010s. (Note: Pyrooz 2024, pp. 330–331, 358–359, 360–361; Young 2023b, p. 5; Brotherton 2021, p. 387; Warnecke 2019, p. 8.) The 2010 Gayle Report, by Jamaican anthropologist Dr Herbert Gayle, is deemed the earliest study to be based on primary data from gang members themselves, followed by a 2016 book (Like Bush Fire) based on the report. Following this, there have been publications by German political economist Dr Hannes Warnecke-Berger and a number of academic articles by British sociologist and ethnographer Dr Adam Baird including Man a Kill a Man for Nutin' (2019) in Men and Masculinities, From Vulnerability To Violence: Gangs And ‘Homicide Booms’ In Trinidad And Belize (2020) in Urban Crime. An international Journal, The fourth corner of the triangle: Gang transnationalism, fragmentation and evolution in Belize City (2021) in the Routledge International Handbook of Critical Gang Studies (Note: Brotherton 2021, p. 387; Warnecke 2019, p. 8.), and Masculine vulnerability, gangs, and perpetual violence (2025) in the Routledge Handbook of Masculinities, Conflict, and Peacebuilding. Baird's 2024 book with Temple University Press titled From South Central to Southside: Gang Transnationalism, Masculinity, and Disorganized Violence in Belize City is the first academic book that provides a thorough historical political-economy of the Bloods and Crips in Belize as a transnational phenomenon. Baird provides firsthand accounts with gang leaders, narco families, national police, politicians and civil servants, as well as the international community in Belize. He argues that gang violence in both the United States and Belize - and indeed all gang affected areas globally - arises from communities shaped by long histories of severe inequality and marginalization. In Belize, he identifies this as beginning with colonialism and slavery. Further, by examining the gendered experiences of young men and women as they navigate the allure, risks, and realities of gang involvement in contexts of socio-economic exclusion, Baird introduces the concept of “chronic vulnerability” in Belize City as underpinning gang violence, not cocaine transhipment or 'deviant' individual behaviour.

In recent years the University of Belize Research Office has been established, paving the way for future research on gangs from national academics.

In popular culture, Belizean gangs were first brought to widespread attention by Ross Kemp in a 2008 episode of Ross Kemp on Gangs. (Note: Gayle 2010a, p. 272; Brotherton 2021, p. 386.) California Assemblyman Tom Hayden had earlier brought them to LA's attention in a 1995 article for the LA Times.

== Timeline ==
Timeline of notable gang-related events in Belize
Date	Place	P (Note: This column flags whether an entry is an act of unlawful physical harm or violence to a person.)	Description	
7 May 2021	Belize City	Yes	Gerald Tillett Jr (17; high-profile George Street member) shot and killed, allegedly by Taylor's Alley.	
1 Jan 2021	Belmopan	No	Gang Intelligence, Investigation & Interdiction Unit (GI3) succeed GSU.	
19 Dec 2020	Belize City	Yes	Terrence Rhaburn (30) killed (and four others injured) in drive-by shooting of mechanic shop (for youth escaping gang life) on Partridge Street Extension.	
Apr 2017	Belize City	No	Gang truce signed (plus joint police-gang March for Peace on 12 April).	
16 Apr 2016	Dangriga, Stann Creek	Yes	Gerald Shiny Tillett Sr (37; George Street leader) killed on Mangrove and St Vincent Streets.	(Note: Janowitz 2021; Brotherton 2021, pp. 389, 392; "George Street gang boss executed in Dangriga". Amandala. 19 April 2016.)
Apr 2014	Belize City	No	Gang truce signed.	
8 Jan 2013	Belize City	Yes	Four alleged George Street members murdered by throat slashing on Dean and Plues Streets, allegedly by GSU.	(Note: Warnecke 2019, pp. 214–215; Janowitz 2021; "Mass murder on George Street: Killers moved in silence & violence". 7 News. 8 January 2013.; "4 throats cut; City shuts down in panic". Amandala. 11 January 2013.)
22 Apr 2012	Belize City	Yes	Arthur Young (38; Taylor's Alley leader) shot and killed by police on Northern Highway.	(Note: Warnecke 2019, pp. 219–220, 223, 227; Amaa; Amab; Janowitz 2021; "Arthur: A brief history". 7 News. 24 April 2012.)
20 Apr 2012	Belize City	Yes	Sheldon Pinky Tillett (31; George Street leader) shot and killed on Northern Highway, allegedly by Taylor's Alley.	(Note: Warnecke 2019, pp. 219–220; Brotherton 2021, p. 392; Janowitz 2021; Amac; "City's 2 top dons shot dead in 48 hours". Amandala. 24 April 2012.)
4 Sep 2011	Belize City	No	Gang truce signed.	(Note: Warnecke 2019, pp. 219–220; Duran 2024, pp. 19–20, 27–29, 31–32; Janowitz 2021; McDermott J (24 December 2012). "Money runs out for Belize gang truce". Insight Crime.)
26 Aug 2011	Belize City	Yes	GSU allegedly brutalise attendees at a George Street funeral.	(Note: Warnecke 2019, pp. 224–225; "GSU goes berserk on George Street!". Amandala. 30 August 2011.)
18 Jul 2010	Hattieville, Belize	Yes	Giovanni Nose Lauriano (33; high-ranking Brick City member) killed, allegedly by George Street.	(Note: Warnecke 2019, p. 219; "The demise of the notorious 'Nose' Lauriano". 7 News. 19 July 2010.)
10 Jun 2010	Belize City	Yes	Andre Dre Trapp (24; alleged Southside leader) shot and killed near Supreme Court on Regent Street, allegedly by George Street.	(Note: Warnecke 2019, p. 219; "Dre Trapp, Southside boss, shot dead mid-morning on Regent Street". Amandala. 11 June 2010.; "The day after Dre's death". 7 News. 11 June 2010.)
8 Apr 2010	Belize City	Yes	Ervin Beans James (22; Ghost Town member) shot and killed on Ross Penn Road, allegedly by George Street.	(Note: Warnecke 2019, p. 219; "Ervin 'Beans' James gunned down in Ross Penn Road attack". 7 News. 9 April 2010.)
Apr 2010	Belmopan	No	GSU founded.	(Note: Warnecke 2019, p. 224; Young 2023b, p. 11; Janowitz 2021.)
Jun 2008	Belize City	No	National Commission for Families and Children (and others) commission Gayle Report (presented October 2010).	
18 May 2008	Belize City	Yes	Mayflower grenade attack on Mayflower & Vernon Streets.	(Note: Gayle 2010a, p. 13; Warnecke 2019, pp. 218–219.)
Apr 2008	Belmopan	No	Home Affairs commission Crooks Report (presented November 2008).	(Note: Warnecke 2019, p. 223.)
9 Feb 2008	Belize City	Yes	Putt Putt shootings on Princess Margaret Drive, Belcan Bridge, Raccoon Street Extension.	—N/a
27 Aug 2007	Belize City	Yes	George Junie Balls McKenzie Jr (33; Majestic Alley leader) murdered by lone gunman on North Front Street, allegedly by Jungle, and allegedly with police aid.	(Note: Amandala 2007a; Brotherton 2021, pp. 389, 391; Janowitz 2021; "Original gangster Junie Balls is dead!". 7 News. 28 August 2007.)
Nov 2002	Hattieville, Belize	No	Kolbe Foundation (Kolbe; local charity) approved to run Central Prison (on Burrell Boom Road).	(Note: Gayle 2010a, p. 145; "Prison to be privatised soon". 7 News. 5 July 2002.; "Director and deputy resign in prison shakeup". News 5. 18 December 2002.)
28 Jan 2000	Belize City	Yes	Anthony Trigger Adderley (27; Crips leader) murdered on Western Highway.	
Nov 1999	Belmopan	No	National Youth Cadet Service Corps (Youth Cadets) founded.	
1995	Belmopan	No	Conscious Youth Development Programme (CYPD) founded.	
18 Feb 1995	Belize City	No	Gang truce (Bird's Isle agreement) signed at Bird's Isle.	(Note: New York Daily Post 1997; Warnecke 2019, p. 219; Duran 2024, pp. 19–20, 22–27, 31–32.)
1993	Belize City	No	Central Prison (on Goal & Gabourel Lanes) relocated to Hattieville, Belize (on Burrell Boom Road) due to severe overpopulation.	(Note: Gayle 2010a, p. 145.)
1992	Belmopan	No	Crime Control & Criminal Justice Act passed (per Crimes Commission report).	(Note: Smith 1998, p. 270; Young 2023b, p. 3; "New law proposed to combat crime". Caribbean Insight. Vol. 15. July 1992. p. 7.)
14 Jun 1992	New York City, US	Yes	Lyndon Tunan Arnold (24; Bloods leader) murdered on Buffalo Avenue, allegedly by Crips.	(Note: Amandala 2007a; Warnecke 2019, p. 214; Amab; Zane JP (15 June 1992). "3 men killed and 2 wounded in shooting afer clash at party". NY Times.)
1992	Belize City	Yes	Derek Itza Brown (Crips leader) murdered at National Stadium, allegedly by Bloods.	(Note: Amandala 2007a; Warnecke 2019, p. 214; "From the publisher". Amandala. 7 August 2021.)
Sep 1991	Belmopan	No	Crimes Commission appointed (report presented early 1992).	(Note: Smith 1998, p. 270; Brotherton 2021, p. 391.)
1991	Belize City	No	Joint BPD-BDF operation "to take back the city streets".	(Note: Rotenberg 1993, p. 120; Brotherton 2021, p. 391; Duran 2024, p. 23.)
1991	Belize City	Yes	Excelsior High (on Fabers Road) student (Crips member) killed in drive-by shooting by lone cyclist.	
1990	Belize City	Yes	"Many students commuting to schools" mugged or beaten by gang members.	
1980s	Belize City	No	Bloods and Crips form in Southside.	(Note: Branigin 1989; Wilk 1993, p. 236; New York Daily Post 1997; Amandala 2007a; Home Affairs 2007, p. 5; Gayle 2010a, pp. 308–309; Warnecke 2019, pp. 210–213; Brotherton 2021, pp. 386, 388–389; Duran 2024, pp. 21–22; Pyrooz 2024, p. 360; Janowitz 2021.)
1960s	Los Angeles, US	No	Bloods and Crips form in South Central.	—N/a

== See also ==
- Crime in Belize
- List of gangs in Belize
