= Gang Suppression Unit =

Belizean law enforcement unit

The Gang Suppression Unit is a special unit of the Belize Police Department, formed in 2010. In 2021, the unit was reincorporated as the Gang Intelligence, Investigation, and Interdiction Unit, abbreviated GI3.

== History ==
PM Dean Barrow announced the formation of the Gang Suppression Unit as a special unit of the Belize Police Department in April 2010, in response to the rising crime rate in Belize which he said had reached crisis proportions. It was part of a larger initiative he dubbed "RESTORE Belize", an acronym for "Re-Establish Security Through Outreach Rehabilitation and Education". The unit's first head was intended to be John Burns Jr., a Belizean American and former Boston Police Department member. In June, Minister of Police and Public Safety Douglas Singh announced that retired police chief William J. Bratton of the Los Angeles Police Department would also play a role. Assistant Superintendent Marco Vidal was named the commander of the new unit; in media interviews soon after, he spoke out in support of a government bill to permit police to hold people in preventive detention for up to 21 days.

In 2011 and 2012, the GSU was involved in a number of controversial raids. In March 2011, the nephew of PUP supporter Yolanda Schakron was delivering goods to a wake for purported gang leader Charles Woodeye; he got caught up in a sweep conducted by police officers who had been trailing the funeral march, and one of them broke his arm with a baseball bat. Then in February 2012, a group of men invaded a home on Dean Street and beat its residents with bats and clubs, leaving four injured, while soon after, a group of men at Taylor's Alley were also beaten. Commander Marco Vidal initially attempted to deny involvement of his officers, but PM Barrow stated that he believed the GSU was involved.

There were various responses to the controversies. Taylor's Alley residents rejected the government's apology. The Belize Times accused the GSU of being a rogue unit of the United Democratic Party. One plank of the People's United Party platform in the 2012 elections was the disbandment of the GSU in favour of increased emphasis on neighbourhood watch groups and traditional police patrols. Despite the controversies, in April after the elections Minister of National Security John Saldivar expressed his support for the GSU. Less than a month later, the GSU conducted another controversial raid, this time on the Orange Walk Town home of McAfee computer security company founder John McAfee. The GSU killed his dog, confiscated his passport, and arrested him on weapons charges. McAfee maintained that the charges were false and that the raid was retaliation for his refusal to donate money to a UDP politician.

In 2021, the unit was disbanded and reincorporated, along with the Anti-Gang Task Force, into the newly-formed Gang Intelligence, Investigation, and Interdiction Unit (abbreviated GI3).

== See also ==
- Gangs in Belize
- List of cases of police brutality in Belize
