= PIV =

PIV may refer to:

== Language ==
- Plena Ilustrita Vortaro de Esperanto, a dictionary of Esperanto
- Vaeakau-Taumako (ISO 639 language code), a Polynesian language

== Science and technology ==
- Particle image velocimetry, an optical method of flow visualization
- Peak inverse voltage, in electronics
- Pentium 4 microprocessor, produced by Intel ("IV" is Roman numeral for "4")
- Personal Identity Verification, as specified by the US federal government standard FIPS 201
- Positive input ventilation, a type of ventilation for buildings
- Post indicator valve, a shut-off valve for otherwise underground pipes, notably for fire sprinklers; see Glossary of firefighting equipment#P
- Pivaloyl protecting group (Piv), a protecting group in chemistry
- P = IV, the formula describing power in terms of current and voltage in electrical power

== Medicine ==
- Parainfluenza virus, single-stranded RNA viruses belonging to the Paramyxoviridae family
- Peripheral intravenous catheter (PIVC), in medicine
- Posterior interventricular artery, an artery supplying the heart

== Other uses ==
- Penis in vagina, a type of sexual intercourse
- PIV (gang), a Belize City street gang
