= Bosaina =

- Also known as: BOSA
- Origin: Cairo, Egypt
- Genres: Alternative; jazz; ambient; industrial; electro; pop
- Occupations: Musician, singer-songwriter, artist, model, actress
- Instruments: Vocals, synthesizer, piano, sampler
- Years active: 2010 – present

Bosaina is an Egyptian singer-songwriter, producer, art curator, actress, and model. She is the lead vocalist for several bands in the Egyptian electronic music collective "Kairo is Koming" (KIK). Bosaina participated in the 2014 Red Bull Music Academy in Tokyo, and starred in The United, the first film by Touchstone Pictures filmed in the Middle East.

== Career ==
In a 2014 interview with Resident Advisor, Bosaina described taking an Ableton Live production course and using the software to create her first EP. She has performed with several Cairo-based electronic bands, including Wetrobots, ZULI, and Quit Together, through her involvement with the "Kairo is Koming" collective (KIK). She has toured globally, performing in Lebanon, Germany, Austria, Switzerland, Japan, and in the United States at the SXSW Festival. A compilation of her two EPs titled "New York April – July 2013" was released in 2017 on the label Discrepant Records.

Bosaina has written, produced, directed, and starred in two pieces of performance art: Darkest Days and Solitude in Public. Both works explore themes of feminism, femininity, and anxiety in art.

Bosaina served as the artistic director for the alternative music space and cultural venue VENT, which has since closed and reopened under new ownership as ZigZag. In 2020, she was described as 'one of the most prolific activists of the electronic scene in Cairo' by Théophile Pillault in a profile for PAM magazine.

== Other work ==
Bosaina ran a fashion school in Cairo for several years.

She also starred in Touchstone Pictures’ The United.

Alongside her work, she advocates for social justice and supports the LGBTQ community. In Egypt, her native country, she has said she was “thrown off stage for not wearing enough clothes.”

== Discography ==
=== EPs ===
- Dirty Bourgeoisie (2011)
- Bang and Blow (2012)
- NY, Apr–Jul 2013 (2013)
- Two Names Upon The Shore (2017)
