= Henry Hughes (director) =

American film director

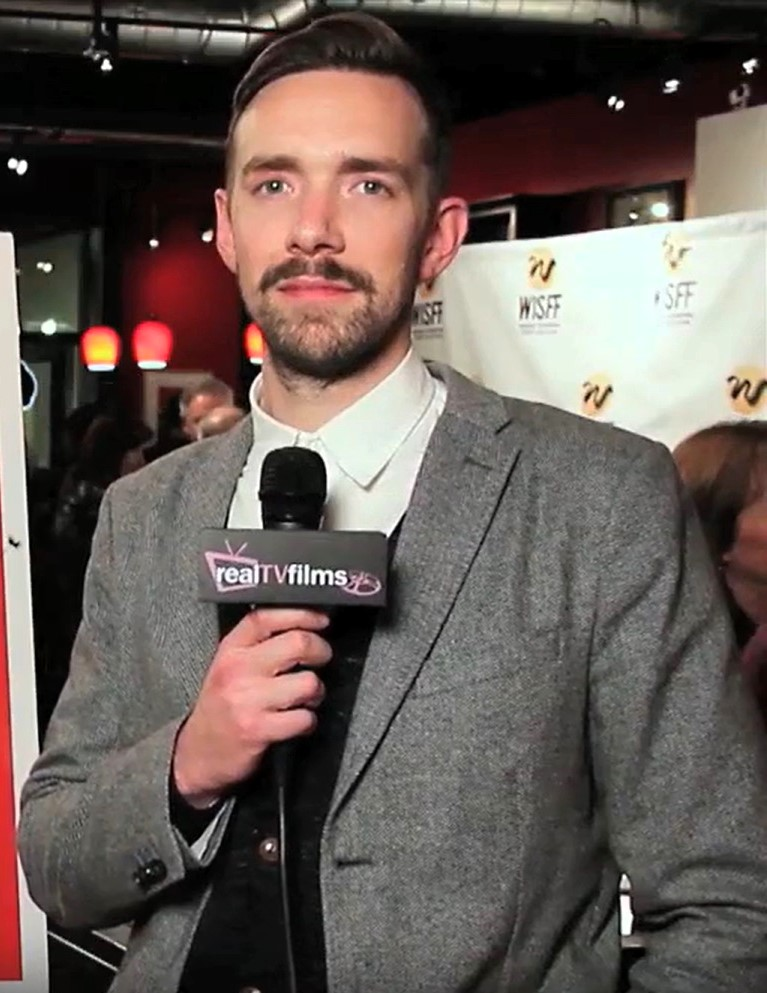
Hughes on RealTVfilms in 2016

1st Lieutenant Henry "Hank" Hughes IV is an American film director and former Paratrooper for 173rd Airborne Brigade Combat Team. He is best known for directing and co-writing the short-film Day One as a part of his graduate project at American Film Institute.

Day One received critical appraisal and earned him a Best Narrative (short) Gold Medal at 42nd Annual Student Film Awards, BAFTA US Student Award at 2016 BAFTA/LA Student Film Awards, and Academy Award for Best Live Action Short Film nomination at 88th Academy Awards. He is a graduate of Boston University.

== Filmography ==
Year	Title	Role	Notes
2015	Day One		Director/Writer
2020	The Outpost	Sergeant Brad Larson	War Drama film

== Awards ==
- Academy Award for Best Live Action Short Film - nominated
- Academy of Television Arts and Sciences Award for Best Directing - Short - won
- Best Narrative (short) Gold Medal - won
- BAFTA US Student Award - won
- Stony Brook Film Festival for Best Short - Jury - won
