= Just Like Us (film) =

- Directed by: Ahmed Ahmed
- Produced by: Ahmed Ahmed, Taylor Feltner, Matthew Blaine
- Starring: Ahmed Ahmed; Whitney Cummings; Omid Djalili; Erik Griffin; Maz Jobrani; Tom Papa; Ted Alexandro; Sebastian Maniscalco; Angelo Tsarouchas; Tommy Davidson
- Cinematography: Taylor Feltner
- Edited by: Benedict X. Kasulis, Veronica Rutledge
- Music by: Omar Fadel
- Release date: 2010 (Tribeca Film Festival)
- Country: United States
- Languages: English, Arabic

Just Like Us is a 2010 documentary about a comedy tour of international comedians throughout the Middle East. Directed by Egyptian-American actor/comedian Ahmed Ahmed, the film premiered at the 2010 Tribeca Film Festival.

== Synopsis ==
Modern technology and globalization have made the world a much smaller place and caused us to be more interconnected as people, yet cultural misconceptions persist. Through a celebration of culture and comedy, this film uproots the widely held misconception that Arabs have no sense of humor − when in fact they laugh, and are, just like us. This documentary features Egyptian-American comedian Ahmed Ahmed, in his directorial debut, along with a host of critically acclaimed international stand-up comedians. Presented by Cross Cultural Entertainment and Cross Cultural Productions, Just Like Us exemplifies their goal of reintroducing socially relevant issues to the world in an effort to build cultural bridges in this age of greater tolerance, understanding and acceptance. The film documents four countries in the Middle East, showcasing the cultures of Dubai, Lebanon, the Kingdom of Saudi Arabia, and Egypt with sold-out crowds totaling over 20,000 people. Contemporary stand-up comedy has the powerful ability to provide relief, encourage a younger generation, break down barriers and serve as a platform for cross-cultural dialogue. This art form is very new to the Middle East and older generations did not have the opportunity to appreciate this creative platform. However, during the current Internet age, stand-up comedy has flourished in the Arab region over the past few years, and continues to show us that laughter is the common language of the world.

Comedian Ahmed Ahmed hosts a celebration of culture through comedy by sharing his experience through the Middle East. It features an international lineup of stand-up comedians that reveals an appreciation for stand-up comedy in a modern generation coming of age.

== Cast ==
- Ahmed Ahmed
- Whitney Cummings
- Omid Djalili
- Erik Griffin
- Maz Jobrani
- Tom Papa
- Ted Alexandro
- Sebastian Maniscalco
- Angelo Tsarouchas
- Tommy Davidson

== Production ==
Just Like Us was filmed in Los Angeles, New York, Arkansas, Cairo, Dubai, Saudi Arabia, Kuwait, and Beirut.

== Release ==
Just Like Us premiered at the 2010 Tribeca Film Festival. Its theatrical premiere was on June 6, 2011 in Los Angeles.

== Music ==
Just Like Us features an original score by Omar Fadel, as well as licensed tracks from Fredwreck, MC Rai, and Tom Morello's Street Sweeper Social Club.
