= Day One (2015 film) =

- Film poster
- Directed by: Henry Hughes
- Written by: Dawn DeVoe; Henry Hughes
- Produced by: Michael Steiner
- Starring: Layla Alizada; Alexia Pearl; Navid Negahban
- Edited by: Anisha Acharya
- Music by: Omar Fadel
- Production company: AFI Conservatory
- Release date: February 27, 2015 (United States)
- Running time: 25 minutes
- Country: United States
- Languages: English; Dari

Day One is a short film directed and co-written by Henry Hughes with Dawn DeVoe. A woman who is on her first day of working as an interpreter for the United States Army is forced to deliver a baby for the wife of an enemy bomb maker. It was made as a thesis film at the AFI Conservatory.

In 2016, the movie was nominated for the Academy Award for Best Live Action Short Film at the 88th Academy Awards.

== Awards and nominations ==
Award	Date of ceremony	Category	Recipients and nominees	Result
Academy Awards	February 28, 2016	Best Live Action Short Film	Day One	Nominated
