= Nizar Wattad =

Nizar Wattad is an American screenwriter, producer and hip-hop artist.

Wattad graduated from the George Washington University in 2002 and worked as a journalist. Wattad began his ongoing collaboration with Hany Abu-Assad, the Oscar-nominated and Golden Globe-winning film director of Paradise Now.

He was recruited by Walt Disney Pictures to write the screenplay for the company's first Arabic language film, The United, which was released by Touchstone in 2012.

== Music ==
Wattad and his younger brother Bader began freestyle rapping while growing up in Johnson City, Tennessee. They formed The Philistines, and in 2003 released an album, Self Defined, with lyrics reflecting a wide range of contemporary issues, notably the situation of the Palestinians.

Wattad continued to perform alongside his long-time friend and colleague Omar Chakaki (Offendum), with whom he co-produced the NOMADS vs Philistines mixtape in 2006. They have also collaborated with HBO Def Poet Mark Gonzales on the spoken-word performance-lecture Brooklyn Beats to Beirut Streets.
