= The United (film) =

- Directed by: Amin Matalqa
- Produced by: Rachel Gandin
- Starring: Waleed Zuaiter; Farouk Al-Fishawy; Bosaina; Amir Scandar
- Cinematography: Ray Peschke,
- Edited by: Debbie Berman
- Music by: Omar Fadel
- Country: United States
- Languages: English, Arabic

The United (Arabic: المتحدين) is an unreleased film produced by Touchstone Pictures. It was conceived as Disney's first ever Arabic-language film, intended primarily for Middle Eastern audiences. Produced by Rachel Gandin, The United was directed by Amin Matalqa, written by Nizar Wattad, and features performances from Farouk Al-Fishawy, Waleed Zuaiter, Bosaina, and Amir Scandar. It was shot in and around Amman, Jordan in January 2011 by veteran cinematographer Ray Peschke, and edited by Debbie Berman. In addition to an original score by composer, Omar Fadel, the United also features a vocal collaboration between three of the Arab world's best known rappers, Omar Offendum, Deeb, and Salah Edin.

== Synopsis ==
The film tells the story of a down-and-out Egyptian soccer coach, his former superstar player, and his determined granddaughter as they gather a team of the best youth soccer players from around the Arab world.

== Release ==
As of October 2012, the release date of The United remained uncertain, due to ongoing instability in the Middle Eastern region.
