= Omar Fadel =

- Born: Houston, Texas
- Occupations: Music composer, musician
- Years active: 2006s-present
- Website: www.omarfadel.com

Omar Fadel is an American composer for film, television, and video games. He is also a multi-instrumentalist, whose scores frequently feature him on a wide array of instruments, including guitar, piano, cello, drums and percussion. Omar's work can be heard in numerous films, television shows and video games, namely the global game franchise Assassin's Creed IV: Black Flag, The Dictator, the Emmy- nominated and Peabody-winning film The Judge, the Emmy- and Peabody-nominated film Belly of the Beast, and the Oscar-nominated film Day One.

== Career ==
Born in Houston, and raised between Texas and Dubai, Omar's global exposure is heard throughout his music. He is a graduate of the University of Texas at Austin where he studied film, music production and composition. Following graduation, Omar re-located to Los Angeles where he began working with Police drummer Stewart Copeland.

Shortly thereafter, Omar began scoring shorts and feature films. In 2010, Omar composed the score to the award-winning feature film The Taqwacores, which premiered to a standing ovation at the Sundance Film Festival. He then went on to score the critically acclaimed Lionsgate documentary Just Like Us. In 2011, Omar was selected to score the first ever Arabic-language, American studio feature film, The United, produced by Walt Disney Motion Pictures. This was followed by Omar scoring the award-winning documentary In Search of Oil and Sand. In 2012, Omar collaborated with composer Erran Baron Cohen on the score for The Dictator. In 2016, Omar scored the Academy Award-nominated short film Day One. In 2017, he scored Erika Cohn's documentary The Judge, which premiered at the Toronto International Film Festival and was eventually nominated for an Emmy and won a Peabody Award. In 2018, Omar composed the score for Yomeddine, which premiered in competition at the Cannes Film Festival and won the François Chalais Award. In 2020, Omar scored the Peabody-nominated and critically acclaimed documentary Belly of the Beast. Also in 2020, Omar had the honor of composing the score for the series Six Windows in the Desert, which was the first ever Saudi Arabian original programming for Netflix. In 2021, Omar entered the world of live streaming content composing the music for the widely popular Dungeons & Dragons-themed show Critical Role.

In addition to his film work, Omar has scored several television shows, most notably, the Mike Judge-produced ABC animated series The Goode Family, and NBC's Phenomenon. Omar's music is also frequently licensed to unscripted television programming including: The Daily Show, Jimmy Kimmel Live!, The X Factor, Dateline, and The Millionaire Matchmaker.

In 2013, Omar entered the world of video games collaborating with composer Brian Tyler on one of the industry's largest franchises, Assassin's Creed IV: Black Flag. In 2016, Omar scored the award-winning virtual reality game The Argos File, which competed at the Venice Film Festival.

That same year, the Sundance Institute awarded Omar a prestigious Fellowship at their Film Music Composer's Lab.

== Select Credits ==
(Selective works)

- 2008: Phenomenon
- 2008: The Colours of Exile
- 2009: Camouflage
- 2009: The Goode Family
- 2009: Next Day Air
- 2010: Just Like Us
- 2010: The Taqwacores
- 2010: Maydoum
- 2011: The United
- 2012: In Search of Oil and Sand
- 2012: Rafea: Solar Mama
- 2013: Assassin's Creed IV: Black Flag
- 2014: "In the Image"
- 2014: "Meet the Patels"
- 2014: "Undying Dreams"
- 2015: "Day One"
- 2017: "The Judge"
- 2018: "The Advocates"
- 2018: "Kiss Me not (Balash Tebusni)"
- 2018: "Yomeddine"
- 2019: "Breaking Fast"
- 2020: "Six Windows in the Desert"
- 2020: "Belly of the Beast"
- 2021: "A Hard Problem"
- 2021: "Critical Role"
