= Crooks report =

2008 Belizean government report

- Map in the Crooks report (Note: In. Shows Belize City (north on right). Plots a random sample of 135 murders from 2005 to 2008 (red), plus the home addresses of involved victims (blue) and offenders (black dots). And in: "Annually between 45% to 50% of all murders [in Belize] are committed in Belize City ... [this map] shows the extremely close proximity between the murder scene and the residence of the victims and murderers. This density makes situational Police interventions, Intelligence Led Policing, CBP [Community Based Policing] and other social programmes potentially more effective".)
- Created: 2 June – 30 November 2008
- Presented: 30 November 2008
- Location: 1902 Constitution Drive, Belmopan, Cayo; 17.2449°N 88.7759°W bco.gov.bz
- Commissioned by: Ministry of National Security (Note: The Ministry of National Security had both the home affairs and national defence (national security) portfolios, and was the governing body of the BPD due to the former. The first portfolio was later spun off from the latter, such that the BPD are now governed by the Ministry of Home Affairs.)
- Author: Harold Crooks
- Media type: Green paper
- Subject: Belize Police Department
- Purpose: To evaluate the department and propose needed changes (Note: Verbatim: "to honestly and objectively evaluate the weaknesses and strengths within the Belize Police Department and to propose changes".)

The Crooks report, (Note: Also Report, Review for report, as in.) officially "A Review of the Belize Police Department", is a 2008 green paper on the Belize Police Department, and so on policing in Belize, by Jamaican scholar and civil servant Harold Crooks, commissioned by the Ministry of National Security. The 174-page report is an evaluation of its subject matter; for each shortcoming identified, it provides a set of corrective measures, resulting in a sum total of 167 recommended policies for policing reform. The paper was submitted in late 2008, reviewed and mostly accepted by early 2009, and released in full by early 2010. The Crooks report is noted for its frank or critical review, the subsequent ministerial sign-off it received, and the eventual failure of the police department to follow through on its accepted recommendations.

The Crooks report came about during a period of booming violent crime and police misconduct, following the 1980s rise of gangs in Belize. It identified deficiencies in leadership, police accountability, criminal investigations, and in a further number of the ways and means employed in policing.

== Background ==
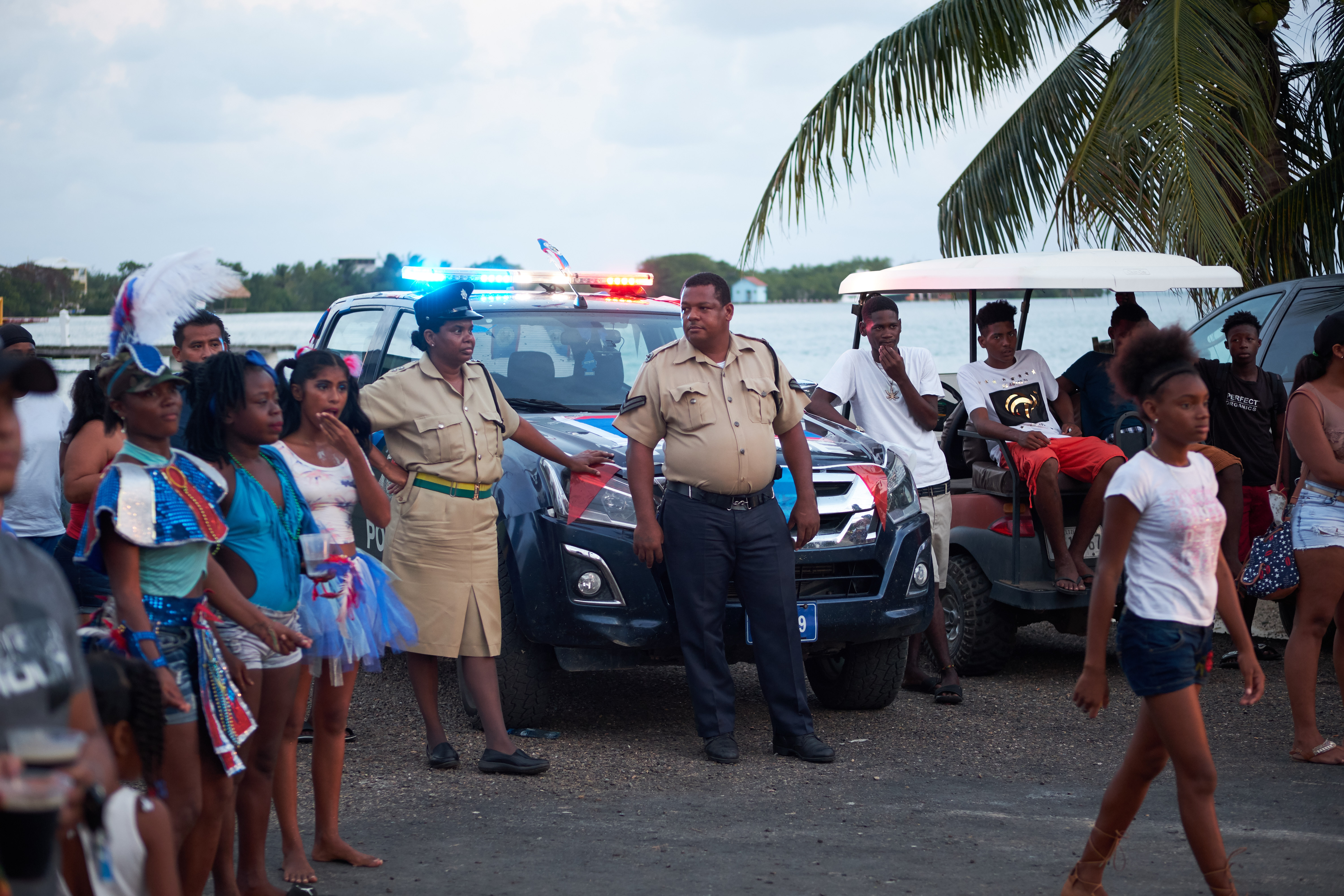
A BPD constable (left) and corporal (right) on crowd control duty for a Carnival parade on Independence Day 2018 in Placencia, Stann Creek

The 1980s rise of gangs prompted the BPD to militarise (noted 2005 example in Belmopan, Cayo shown (Note: In this 21 January 2005 protest, ACP Crispin Jeffries Sr (centre on megaphone) read the riot act when the relevant protest permit expired, then called in BPD riot police (sides in black riot gear) to disperse the crowd by force.)). This failed to stem the ensuing crime wave, and rather aggravated existing police brutality and unlawful killings, which in turn further entrenched public mistrust of the BPD's competence and integrity.

The 1980s saw the rise of street gangs in Belize, introduced by US deportees and increasingly embraced in Belize City by the decade's end, following the local box office success of a number of US hood films, most notably Colors of 1988. This phenomenon was immediately followed by an alarming wave of violent crime which only worsened to epidemic proportions in the 2000s. Thus prompted, the staid Belize Police Department now started (hastily) adopting a number of novel (to them) criminological measures aimed at curbing the rampant gang violence. (Note: In the 2000s, the BPD laid out the measures they intended to adopt to fight crime in two five-year policy papers, termed Policing Plans or policing plans; the earlier plan covered the span from 2000 to 2005, while the later one covered from 2006 to 2010.) This innovative programme involved heavier reliance on the Belize Defence Force for domestic law enforcement, and the rapid militarisation of police. The rate of indictable offences kept climbing however, seemingly impervious to said efforts, and in apparent lockstep with that of cases of police brutality and unlawful killings, leading to a (further) breakdown of public trust in the beleaguered department. Consequently, on 10 April 2008, their governing body, the Ministry of National Security in Belmopan, Cayo (now Home Affairs), commissioned a green paper on the matter from Harold Crooks, a Norman Manley Law School criminology lecturer and long-standing member of the Jamaica Constabulary Force and national security advisor to the Jamaican Ministry of National Security. The Jamaican consultant conducted their review of the police department and elaborated their report over a six-month period from 2 June, and presented it to home minister Carlos Perdomo on 30 November 2008. The Crooks report was embargoed as classified information until March 2010, though a 28-page executive summary was released on 28 January 2009.

== Contents ==
Belizeans' personal safety plummetted in the 2000s (shown (Note: From Our World in Data.)), coincident with rising violent crime, falling public safety and worsening police misconduct

The Crooks report is very critical of the Belize Police Department's competency as regards implementing the various policing and institutional measures imposed on the department by leadership, partly because these were exceedingly ambitious, and partly because the department had very little in the way of accountability, and very much in the way of corruption. According to University of Quintana Roo scholars Carlos Barrachina and Alejandro Monjaraz, the said measures, as earlier laid out in two departmental white papers (policing plans) for the 2000 to 2005 and 2006 to 2010 periods, respectively, had been "very difficult to achieve" despite being most "necessary". And according to Crooks, by the time of his review, police had met only five of twenty-eight (under 18 percent of) targets set in the earlier policing plan, whilst their progress towards those of the later plan was still "very difficult to measure" at the halfway mark (2008). The Crooks report makes 167 recommendations for policing reform, presented in nine chapters spanning 174 pages.

To Barrachina and Monjaraz, Crooks's recommendations on professionalising the police force are "the most important", as the report itself "clearly indicates the need" to standardise and modernise initial and continuing training in the country's police academy, policing practice in the field, and career advancement within the department. According to Inter-American Development Bank consultants Jennifer Peirce and Alexandre Veyrat-Pontet, the Crooks report showed that the "police force needs to be better equipped and trained and more effectively deployed", and underscored the "added challenges and complexities brought on by transnational crime dynamics, increased drug trafficking, and youth gang dynamics", which the department's traditional (amateur) community policing was "not equipped to overcome". And according to Belize Defence Force lieutenant colonel Raymond Shepherd, the report most significantly identified and recommended a myriad sorely needed improvements to human capital.

According to the aforementioned, the main findings of the Crooks report were: police lack the modern or professional tools, means, conditions, standards or know-how needed in a number of areas; criminal investigations are rudimentary or inadequate; actual or perceived police misconduct is rising; internal affairs is weak or inadequate; and external or internal leadership is poor or inadequate.

== Reception ==
Upon Crooks's presentation of the report in late 2008, News 5 noted that it "blasted the police and should serve as a wake up call for early reform". Home minister Perdomo publicly praised it for its "in depth" and "critical" analysis of the police department, and voiced their intention to support its recommendations. By January 2009, the home ministry had formally accepted most of Crooks's recommendations, and so had directed the police department to implement the approved ones "over the next few years". By 2012 though, 7 News commented that the report now rather "gathered dust on some disused shelf" of the department's headquarters, observing that the promised reforms had not yet materialised "in any tangible way". And by 2013, Peirce and Veyrat-Pontet could not "determine which of its recommendations, if any, were implemented". This apparent failure to follow through on the accepted Crooks recommendations seeminly carried on to the 2020s. In 2021, former home ministry permanent secretary Geoge Lovell noted in the press that "only temporary solutions [in policing reform] have been achieved, and on every occasion, those solutions bring us back to the same environment where crime and violence persist", adding that the ministry had still "not taken advantage" of the Crooks report, nor of later expert reviews of policing or the police department.

Peirce and Veyrat-Pontet called the Crooks report a "strong policy document", noting that it "sets out a clear action plan for reforming" the department. Barrachina and Monjaraz deemed reactions to the report "quite positive", noting that it was (purportedly) adopted as a "foundational document" by the incoming Dean Barrow government, who reorganized the home ministry and appointed a new commissioner of police (Crispin Jeffries Sr (Note: Pictured above.)) in an effort to actually implement the accepted recommendations. They commended Crooks for compiling "a highly critical report in which he analysed point by point the main problems of the Belize police force", calling his report "an excellent analysis" of the department.

== See also ==
- National Policing Improvement Agency – result of a similar UK report

== Notes and references ==
=== References ===
1. "Constitutional Amendments Will Give Cops More Powers". News 5. Belize City. 10 April 2008.
2. "Crooks Report on Bz. Police Department Still Under Wraps". News 5. Belize City. 12 December 2008.
3. "The Crooks Report". 7 News. Belize City. 28 January 2009.
4. "The Real Crooks Report". 7 News. Belize City. 23 July 2012.
5. "UDP Offers Again to Join Bipartisan Crime Prevention Committee". Breaking Belize News. San Ignacio, Belize. 27 July 2021.
6. Barrachina C, Monjaraz A (2013). "Belize: Reflections on Police Training and Professionalization". Journal of Arts and Humanities. 2 (2): 53–63. ISSN 2167-9053.
7. Crooks H (2008). A Review of the Belize Police Department (Report). Belmopan, Belize: Ministry of National Security.
8. Janowitz N (15 July 2021). "How the US Exported a Bloods and Crips Gang War to Belize". Vice. New York.
9. Peirce J, Veyrat-Pontet A (2013). Citizen Security in Belize (Report). Washington, DC: IDB. doi:10.18235/0009140.
10. Shepherd RW (2010). Organizational Friction: Urban Crime Control Diminish Effect Theory (MA Thesis). Ft Leavenworth, Kansas: US Army Command and General Staff College.
