= Rollin' 30s Harlem Crips =

Street gang in Los Angeles

- Founded: 1960s
- Founders: Kirkus Mayen, Dalmin Mayen, Morgan Mayen (Harlem chapter)
- Founding location: Los Angeles, California, United States
- Years active: 1960s-present
- Territory: Los Angeles, New York City and Belize City
- Ethnicity: Predominantly Afro-American and West Indian People
- Membership (est.): 700-1,000
- Leaders: Dalmin "Diamond" Mayen, Kirkus Mayen, George "Juni Balls" McKenzie (Belize)
- Activities: Drug trafficking, weapon trafficking, extortion, robbery and murder
- Allies: Cali Cartel (historically in Belize)
- Rivals: Bloods

The Rollin' 30s Harlem Crips are a "set" of the Crips alliance of street gangs. The gang was formed by Belizean American Crips who had moved from South Los Angeles to Belize and then to Harlem, New York.

== History ==
In 1961, a hurricane prompted the first major wave of immigration from British Honduras to South Los Angeles, which was already home to street gangs like the Crips and the Bloods. Eventually, this exodus resulted in about 40,000 Belizeans living in Los Angeles, while fewer than 230,000 remained in Belize. This immigration resulted in a cultural exchange; Los Angeles acquired Caribbean restaurants and soca bands, while Belize inherited the gang culture.

The spread of gangs among Belizeans accelerated in the 1980s. This was further fueled when Belize was wired for television in 1983 and by the popularity of the 1988 gang film Colors. Following a wave of gang violence, ethnic Belizean gang members were deported back to Belize. Deported Belizean gang members quickly spread the culture of Bloods and Crips in Belize City. By the early 1990s, slum neighborhoods like Majestic Alley and Pink Jungle were overrun with Los Angeles-style gang members, whose activities were partly funded by the Cali Cartel moving cocaine through Belize. While the gang was in Belize, it adopted its current name. The violence reached the point where 1,500-year-old Mayan ruins were defaced with gang graffiti, and bicycle drive-by shootings became common. By 1995, Belize City, despite having a population of only 45,000, was home to 1,500 gang members responsible for 89 murders in the previous few years. During a 1995 truce, local Crips leader George "Juni Balls" McKenzie announced, "We rule Belize."

The Rollin' 30s Harlem Crips were established in New York City by Dalmin "Diamond" Mayen, his two brothers (Kirkus and Morgan), and several other associates, who set up a drug enterprise in the blocks surrounding 118th Street and Fifth Avenue after arriving from Belize in the late 1980s or early 1990s (around 1989). Kirkus, the oldest brother and a reputed drug dealer, quickly established a base of operations at 1 East 118th Street, right outside American Legion Post 1943. By 1995, the gang was active in Harlem and responsible for several assaults and shootings.

Unlike local New York gangs emerging from prisons who often used razors or box cutters, the Belizean Crips were heavily armed. According to one law enforcement source, "These aren't kids running around with box cutters. These guys are shooters." According to a 1997 indictment, gang members put four bullet holes in the car of a man who tried to discourage drug buyers on 118th Street. They were also believed to have shot a 13-year-old girl in the neck; she was caught in the line of fire when the Rollin' Thirties sprayed bullets from a rooftop at rival Bloods after the Crips burned a red bandana on Fifth Avenue. The gang also targeted its own members. A suspected informant was taken to a rubble-strewn lot on 117th Street, where he was shot in the head, stabbed five times, and had his tattoo cut off; police found him barely alive with a broken blade in his arm. In 1997, the gang was making $4,000 per day in drug sales.

== Activities ==
The Rollin 30s Harlem Crips are involved in drug trafficking. Other criminal activities of the gang include weapon trafficking, prostitution, murder, and robbery.

=== Investigations and prosecutions ===
The New York City Police Department (NYPD) became aware of the presence of the gang in November 1995 after several members assaulted a teenaged girl who was wearing red clothing — the gang colors of the rival Bloods gang. In April 1996, the gang's leader, Dalmin "Diamond" Mayen, fired a gun at an elderly neighbor who confronted him about his drug dealing, prompting police to begin investigating the gang.

Following a seven-month investigation, 24 members of the Rollin' 30s Harlem Crips in East Harlem were arrested on charges of attempted murder, sexual assault, and selling crack cocaine and heroin, on October 29, 1997. The arrests occurred at dawn on a Wednesday, when a small army of 300 cops backed by helicopters raided Harlem. This marked the completion of an ambitious investigation by the NYPD's Citywide Anti-Gang Enforcement Unit and the Manhattan district attorney's office. Reminders of their reign were left behind in blue graffiti on broken concrete that read: "Crip 4 Life Steady Crippin' Rollin' 30's".

In 2012, the Federal Bureau of Investigation (FBI), the Los Angeles Police Department (LAPD), and the Los Angeles County District Attorney's Office initiated Operation Thumbs Down, an 18-month investigation that targeted members and associates of the Rollin’ 30s Harlem Crips in South Los Angeles. The investigation culminated on August 29, 2013, when 35 gang members charged with various narcotics and weapons violations were taken into custody in an operation involving over 800 law enforcement officers and agents.

On May 12, 2021, the United States Attorney for the Central District of California announced the arrests of three members of the Rollin' 30s Crips, Malik Lamont Poweel, Khai McGhee, and Marquise Anthony Gardon, in the robbery of a $500,000 Richard Mille watch from a patron of Il Pastaio in Beverly Hills, California.
