= Erik Griffin =

American actor

- Griffin in 2026
- Born: Erik Griffin; March 12, 1972 (age 54); Los Angeles, California, U.S.
- Spouse: Rachel Sklar

Comedy career
- Medium: Stand-up comedy, podcasting, film, television
- Genre: Observational comedy
- Website: erikgriffin.com

Erik Griffin (born March 12, 1972) is an American stand-up comedian, writer, podcaster and actor. From 2011 to 2017, he portrayed Montez Walker on television series Workaholics. He also had roles in I'm Dying Up Here and Blunt Talk, as well as the films Mike and Dave Need Wedding Dates (2016) and Murder Mystery (2019).

== Early life ==
Griffin was born on March 12, 1972, in Los Angeles, California. He was raised by his mother, an immigrant from Belize. He never met his father.

== Career ==
Griffin started doing stand-up in 2003. Prior to this, he worked at a school coaching basketball and handling office work.

From 2011 to 2017, he portrayed Montez Walker on Comedy Central's Workaholics. He recorded a half-hour special for Comedy Central on February 28, 2013. Later that year, he released his first stand-up album, Technical Foul: Volume One, on March 12, 2013.

In 2015, he was cast as Ralph Carnegie in the television series I'm Dying Up Here. Erik Griffin: The Ugly Truth premiered on July 7, 2017, on Showtime. His next special Amerikan Warrior also premiered on Showtime in June 2018.

Beginning in 2022, Brendan Schaub and Theo Von added Chris D'Elia to their weekly podcast King and the Sting, renaming it to King and the Sting and Wing. During this time Griffin became a regular guest-host. On November 4, 2022, King and the Sting and Wing was officially renamed The Golden Hour, with Griffin replacing Theo Von. He also hosts his own podcast, Riffin' With Griffin.

== Filmography ==
=== Film ===
Year	Title	Role	Director	Notes
2009	The Soul Agency	Pizza Owner	Allan Cunningham	
2010	Weeding Out	Rodger	Georgy Kao	
2016	Mike and Dave Need Wedding Dates	Driver	Jake Szymanski	
2016	First Girl I Loved	Mr. Maldonado	Kerem Sanga	
2017	Fatties: Take Down the House	Police Chief Williams	Bob Gordon	
2018	Furlough	Warden Borden	Laurie Collyer	
2018	Electric Love	Officer Joi	Aaron Fradkin	
2019	Murder Mystery	Jimmy	Kyle Newacheck	
2019	Airplane Mode	Co-Pilot Trussell	David Dinetz & Dylan Trussell	
2020	Bad Therapy	Principal Sykes	William Teitler	
2020	The Sleepover	Henry	Trish Sie	
2020	Guest House	Officer Ford	Sam Macaroni	
2021	Hero Mode	Mr. Diehl	A.J. Tesler	
2022	Somewhere in Queens	DJ Joey Bones	Ray Romano	
2025	Easy's Waltz	Anton	Nic Pizzolatto	
2026	Behemoth!	Bobby Royster	Tony Gilroy	

=== Television ===
Year	Title	Role	Notes
2010	Roomies	Gary Kohlman	TV miniseries
2011–2017	Workaholics	Montez Walker	44 episodes
2012	Franklin & Bash	Patrick Meisner	Episode: "Jango and Rossi"
2012	Daddy Knows Best	Bob	Episode: "Sh*t"
2012	A Guy Walks Into a Bar	Guy	Episode: "Peace & Quiet"
2012	Workaholics: The Other Cubicle	Montez Walker	6 episodes
2013	Arrested Development	Jaspar	Episode: "Flight of the Phoenix"
2014	Twinzies: Couples Therapy	Ronnie	Episode: "Grindtopia"
2014–2015	Lucas Bros. Moving Co.	Houdini (voice)	2 episodes
2015	Super Clyde	Mr. Phillips	TV movie
2015	You're the Worst	Trace	2 episodes
2015	Harvey Beaks	Coach Kip Dinkly / Swamp Monster (voice)	2 episodes
2015–2016	Blunt Talk	Gershawn	7 episodes
2016	Morris & the Cow	Levon (voice)	TV movie
2016	Bob's Burgers	Gerald (voice)	Episode: "Large Brother, Where Fart Thou?"
2016	Adam Ruins Everything	Ozzy	Episode: "Adam Ruins Football"
2016	Dr. Havoc's Diary	Super Jamal (voice)	1 episode
2017	One Day at a Time	Carl	Episode: "This Is It"
2017	Ghosted	Donny	Episode: "Lockdown"
2017–2018	I'm Dying Up Here	Ralph King / Ralph Carnegie	20 episodes
2018	The 5th Quarter	Ray Cook	Episode: "The Oh-No No-No"
2018	Alone Together	Rick	Episode: "Murder House"
2021–2023	Ten Year Old Tom	Coach (voice)	20 episodes
2023	Lopez vs Lopez	Don	Episode: "Lopez vs. The Godfather"
2023	Minx	Chuck	Episode: "The Perils of Being a Wealthy Widow"
2024	Universal Basic Guys	Boris (voice)	4 episodes

== Documentary appearances ==
Year	Title	Director	Notes
2010	Just Like Us	Ahmed Ahmed	
2017	Funny: The Documentary	J.D. Cohen	
