= List of gangs in Belize =

The following is a list of collective or corporate entities involved in organised crime in Belize, including street gangs, drug cartels, mafias, criminal enterprises and criminal syndicates. This list includes both known or suspected and active or defunct entities. Tongs, outlaw motorcycle clubs, as well as terrorist, militant and paramilitary groups are included only if involved in organised crime. Entities not based in Belize are included only if they are known to have or suspected of having members, chapters or operations in Belize. (Note: Notes and short citations provided in Cf columns. For gangs, Aff, Base, Age and No columns give gang affiliation (Bloods or Crips), location in Belize City (Northside versus Southside), estimated mean age of members and estimated median tally of members, respectively. This article uses ACLED data (Raleigh 2023, filtered for Belize on 16 July 2025) for information on recent (2018 and later) gang-related incidents.)

== Gangs ==
Bloods and Crips gangs were introduced to Belize by US deportees in the 1980s, and especially adopted by locals upon the 1988 release of Colors. (Note: Janowitz 2021; Warnecke 2019, pp. 210, 212.) A boom in violent and organised crime followed, not yet mitigated by the 2020s. (Note: For instance, Warnecke 2019 found the murder rate has been steadily increasing since the 1990s (pp. 4-6, 197, 209), noting the state, scholars, and press often blame gangs for the vast majority of crime (pp. 1, 8, 198, 209-210).) As of 2019, there were at least three dozen gangs in Belize City, each loosely affiliated to Bloods or Crips, totalling some 900 to 1,400 members. (Note: Warnecke 2019, p. 210; Young 2019m, pp. xv, 19–20. Though data 'is limited' (Young 2019m, p. 19).)

Name	Aff	Base	Size	Age	No	State	Cf
Gill Street; Gill Street Bloods	Bloods	South	Minor	24.0	25	Active	(Note: Warnecke 2019, p. 216; Young 2019m, pp. 9, 21–22.)
Kraal Street; Kraal Road Crips	Crips	South	Minor	26.5	25	Active	(Note: Warnecke 2019, p. 216; Young 2019m, pp. 9, 21–22.)
Taylor's Alley; Taylor's Alley Crips, Taylor's Alley Bloods, West Molan Bloods	?	North	Major	23.5	35	Active	(Note: Warnecke 2019, p. 216; Young 2019m, pp. 9, 21–22, 24.)
Supal Road; Supal Road Gang, Supal Street Gang, Supal Street Crips, Supal Street Bloods	?	South	Minor	26.0	35	Active	(Note: Warnecke 2019, p. 216; Young 2019m, pp. 9, 21–22; Raleigh 2023.)
Euphrates; Euphrates Bloods	Bloods	South	Minor	—N/a	—N/a	?	(Note: Warnecke 2019, p. 216.)
Wagner's Lane	?	South	Minor	—N/a	—N/a	?	(Note: Warnecke 2019, p. 216.)
Rocky Road; Rocky Road Gang, Rocky Road Crips, Rocky Road Bloods	?	South	Minor	26.0	18	Active	(Note: Warnecke 2019, p. 216; Young 2019m, pp. 9, 21–22; Raleigh 2023.)
Pinks Alley	?	North	Minor	—N/a	—N/a	?	(Note: Warnecke 2019, p. 216.)
Neighbourhood; Neighbourhood Bloods	Bloods	South	Minor	—N/a	—N/a	?	(Note: Warnecke 2019, p. 216.)
Kick Down Fence	?	South	Minor	—N/a	—N/a	?	(Note: Warnecke 2019, p. 216.)
George Street; GSG, George Street Gang, George Street Bloods, Plum Street, Devon Bailey Area, George Street Gaza Gang	Bloods	South	Major	31.5	45	Active	(Note: Warnecke 2019, pp. 214–216; Young 2019m, pp. 9, 21–22, 24; Raleigh 2023. Deemed 'the most powerful' with up to 150 members and 'well developed internal informal hierarchies' (Warnecke 2019, p. 215). Main rivals deemed Southside Gang and Pregnant Alley Gang (Warnecke 2019, p. 215). NYC killing of leader Lyndon 'Tunan' Arnold (in retaliation for 1992 killing of alleged Majestic Alley Crips leader Derek 'Itza' Brown) deemed 'most visible initial event' of incipient gang warfare, after which 'violence between gangs became more and more entrenched and the level of violence increased' (Warnecke 2019, p. 214). 2012 killing of leader Shelton 'Pinky' Tillett broke a 2011 government-mediated truce of 13 gangs, including GSG (Warnecke 2019, pp. 219–220).)
Victoria Street; Victoria Street Bloods	Bloods	North	Minor	26.0	27	Active	(Note: Warnecke 2019, p. 216; Young 2019m, pp. 9, 21–22; Raleigh 2023.)
Pickstock Street; Pickstock Hutment Crips	Crips	North	Minor	—N/a	—N/a	Active	(Note: Warnecke 2019, p. 216; Young 2019m, p. 22.)
Kelly Street; Kelly Street Crips	Crips	North	Minor	26.0	25	Active	(Note: Warnecke 2019, p. 216; Young 2019m, pp. 9, 21–22.)
Back-a-Town; Back-a-Town Bloods, Back-a-Town Crips	?	South	Minor	29.5	25	Active	(Note: Warnecke 2019, p. 216; Young 2019m, pp. 9, 21–22; Raleigh 2023.)
Ghost Town; Ghost Town Crips, Banak Street, Mayflower Street, Banak Crips, Banak Zone Gang	Crips	South	Minor	28.0	65	Active	(Note: Warnecke 2019, p. 216; Young 2019m, pp. 9, 21–22; Raleigh 2023.)
Raiders	?	South	Minor	—N/a	—N/a	?	(Note: Warnecke 2019, p. 216.)
Amara Street; Amara Street Bloods, Amara Bloods	Bloods	South	Minor	24.5	23	Active	(Note: Warnecke 2019, p. 216; Young 2019m, pp. 9, 21–22.)
Jerusalem; Jerusalem Gang, Jerusalem Bloods, Jerusalem Crips	?	South	Minor	28.5	13	Active	(Note: Warnecke 2019, p. 216; Young 2019m, pp. 9, 21–22.)
Trapp; Trapp Bloods	Bloods	North	Minor	—N/a	—N/a	?	(Note: Warnecke 2019, p. 216.)
PIV; Peace in the Village Bloods, Peace in the Valley Bloods, St Thomas PIV	Bloods	South	Major	26.0	150	Active	(Note: Warnecke 2019, p. 216; Young 2019m, pp. 9, 21–22; Raleigh 2023. Deemed one of 'largest gangs by estimated number of members' (Young 2019m, p. 20).)
Jane Usher; Jane Usher Bloods	Bloods	South	Minor	26.0	40	Active	(Note: Warnecke 2019, p. 216; Young 2019m, pp. 9, 21–22.)
Southside; Southside Gang, South Side Gang, Southside Gangsters, Southside Crips	Crips	South	Major	26.0	95	Active	(Note: Warnecke 2019, p. 215-216; Young 2019m, pp. 9, 21–22; Raleigh 2023. Deemed 'second in terms of organisational capacities' to main rivals GSG (Warnecke 2019, p. 215). Deemed one of 'largest gangs by estimated number of members' (Young 2019m, p. 20).)
Sunset; Sunset Crips	Crips	South	Minor	24.5	13	Active	(Note: Warnecke 2019, p. 216; Young 2019m, pp. 9, 21–22.)
Majestic Alley; Majestic Alley Crips	Crips	North	Major	28.5	38	Active	(Note: Warnecke 2019, p. 214; Young 2019m, pp. 21–22, 24; Raleigh 2023.)
Pregnant Alley; Pregnant Alley Gang	?	?	Major	—N/a	—N/a	?	(Note: Warnecke 2019, p. 215. Deemed 'second in terms of organisational capacities' to main rivals GSG (Warnecke 2019, p. 215).)
Brick City; Brick City Gang	?	?	Minor	—N/a	—N/a	?	(Note: Warnecke 2019, p. 219.)
Back-a-Land; BLC, Back-a-Land Crips	Crips	South	Major	29.5	25	Active	
Conch Shell; Conch Shell Bloods, Conch Shell Bay Bloods, Lauriano Bloods	Bloods	South	Minor	24.5	28	Active	
Jump Street; Jump Street Gang, Jump Street Crips	Crips	South	Minor	27.0	25	Active	
123rd 123rd Gang	?	South	Minor	—N/a	—N/a	Active	
Afghanistan; Afghanistan Gang, Afghanistan Bloods	Bloods	South	Minor	24.5	13	Active	
Gaza New Generation; Gaza New Generation Bloods	Bloods	South	Major	15.0	80	Active	(Note: Young 2019m, pp. 9, 21–22. Deemed one of 'largest gangs by estimated number of members' (Young 2019m, p. 20).)
Jungle; Jungle Bloods	Bloods	?	Minor	26.0	30	Active	
Louise Bevans; Louise Bevans Crips, Louise Bevins Crips, Freedom Street	Crips	South	Minor	24.5	35	Active	
Antelope Street; Antelope Street Bloods, Antelope Extension Bloods, Antelope Crew, Crenshaw Bloods	Bloods	South	Minor	27.0	28	Active	
Lacroix Boulevard; Lacroix Boulevard Bloods	Bloods	?	Minor	25.5	28	Active	
Police Street; Police Street Crips	Crips	?	Minor	26.0	30	Active	
Plum Tree; Plum Tree Bloods	Bloods	?	Minor	24.5	23	Active	
Kings Park; Kings Park Crips	Crips	?	Minor	29.0	18	Active	
103 New Road; 103 New Road Bloods	Bloods	North	Minor	21.0	18	Active	
Riverside Boys	?	?	Minor	16.0	18	Active	
102; 102 Crips, Parham Crips	Crips	?	Minor	26.5	13	Active	
Belama; Belama Bloods, Riverside Bloods	Bloods	?	Minor	25.0	13	Active	
Simon Lamb Street; Simon Lamb Street Crips	Crips	?	Minor	27.5	13	Active	
Neals Penn Road; Neals Penn Road Bloods, Gaza Bloods	Bloods	?	Minor	25.0	13	Active	
Horse and Carriage; Horse and Carriage Bloods	Bloods	?	Minor	23.5	13	Active	
Brian Brown Faction; Brian Brown Crew	?	South	Minor	—N/a	—N/a	Active	
Nurse Finley Faction; Nurse Finley Faction Gang	?	?	Minor	—N/a	—N/a	Active	
Genaside; Genaside Gang	?	?	Minor	—N/a	—N/a	Active	
T Street Faction; T Street Faction Gang	?	?	Minor	—N/a	—N/a	Active	

=== George Street ===
George Street
- Founded: ca late 1980s
- Founder: Heathcliff Reyes
- Founding location: George Street, Belize City, Belize
- Territory: c. 138 acres around George Street (2018)
- Membership (est.): 40–50 (2018); up to 150 (2019)
- Leaders: List: Heathcliff Reyes; Lyndon Tunan Arnold; Sheldon Pinky Tillett; Gerald Shiny Tillett Sr
- Rivals: List: Majestic Alley; Taylor's Alley; Southside; Pregnant Alley; Brick City; Ghost Town

George Street are a Bloods-affiliated street gang in Southside Belize City, allegedly formed in the late 1980s by US deportee Heathcliff Reyes to oppose the concurrently formed Majestic Alley (Crips). (Note: Janowitz 2021. Per first-hand account by Leslie Pipe Pipersburgh (former Crips member) in 2021 (Janowitz 2021).) They (with Majestic Alley) are thought to be the country's earliest gangs. They initially claimed all the Southside as their base of operations. Their alleged 1992 murder of Derek Itza Brown (Majestic Alley leader) is thought to have kicked off gang warfare in Belize.

The 2000s saw Reyes shot dead by police, the rise to prominence of the Tillett family in the gang, and a bitter rivalry with the neighbouring Taylor's Alley (Bloods) which bled into the 2010s. The late 2000s is thought to have been a boon to the gang, allegedly culminating in successful hits against leaders of rival gangs (Southside, Brick City, Ghost Town) in 2010. In 2011, they joined a government-mediated gang truce, which is thought to have come undone partially due to the 2012 killing of their then-leader, Sheldon Pinky Tillett, allegedly by Taylor's Alley.

In late 2018, their (with PIV's, Back a Land's, Southside's) gang territory was estimated as amongst the largest (of 36) in the country. Their numbers were estimated at 40 to 50, with a mean age of 32 (the only gang whose members' average age was in the 30s, rather than 20s or teens). In 2019, they were deemed "the most powerful [of 24 gangs]" given their membership ("up to 150 gang members") and organisation ("well developed internal informal hierarchies").

In 2021, they (with PIV, Southside, Gaza New Generation) were considered amongst the largest gangs (of "over 40") in the country.

=== Majestic Alley ===
Majestic Alley
- Founded: late 1980s
- Founder: Fredrick Diggy Dap Lynch
- Founding location: Majestic Alley, Belize City, Belize
- Territory: c. 11 acres around Majestic Alley (2018)
- Membership (est.): 25–50 (2018)
- Leaders: List: Fredrick Diggy Dap Lynch; Derek Itza Brown
- Rivals: George Street

Majestic Alley are a Crips-affiliated street gang in Northside Belize City, allegedly formed in the late 1980s by US deportee Fredrick Diggy Dap Lynch to oppose the concurrently formed George Street (Bloods). They (with George Street) are thought to be the country's earliest gangs. They initially claimed all the Northside as their base of operations. Their alleged 1992 murder of Lyndon Tunan Arnold (George Street leader) is thought to have kicked off gang warfare in Belize.

Lynch is thought to have fled the country upon witnessing the 2007 murder of a close associate (Crips leader George Junie Balls McKenzie).

In late 2018, their gang territory was estimated as being on the smaller side (a few blocks). Their numbers were estimated at 25 to 50, with a mean age of 29.

== Other entities ==
Guatemalan and Mexican groups use Belize to receive, store, and move illicit drugs and precursor chemicals. Furthermore, Belizean gangs seemingly provide logistical help in return for illicit drugs and arms. (Note: Bunker 2013, p. 183; Krylova 2023, p. 9.)

Name	Base	Size	State	Cf
Mendoza clan Mendoza family	Guatemala	Major	?	(Note: Bunker 2013, pp. 183, 194. Well-connected crime family; Zetas arrival [likely 2007] 'forced them to change their calculus' (Bunker 2013, pp. 180–181). Allegedly use(d) Belize 'as a respite and strategic headquarters' (Bunker 2013, p. 183).)
Zetas; Los Zetas	Mexico	Major	?	(Note: Bunker 2013, p. 194.)
Sinaloa; Sinaloa Cartel	Mexico	Major	?	(Note: Bunker 2013, p. 194.)
MS-13; Mara Salvatrucha	El Salvador	Major	Active	

== See also ==
- Gangs in Belize – topical overview
- Crips–Bloods gang war – ongoing in Belize and elsewhere
- Rollin' 30s Harlem Crips – Belizean gang in America

== Notes and references ==
=== References ===
1. Raleigh C, Kishi R, Linke A (2023). "Political instability patterns are obscured by conflict dataset scope conditions, sources, and coding choices". Humanities and Social Sciences Communications. 10 (Art no 74) 74. doi:10.1057/s41599-023-01559-4.
2. Baird A (2019). "'Man a Kill a Man for Nutin': Gang Transnationalism, Masculinities, and Violence in Belize City". Men and Masculinities. 24 (3): 411–431. doi:10.1177/1097184X19872787.
3. Young HA, Patrick A (2023). "Gangs in the City: Profiles of Reality". Journal of Belizean Research. 1 (2). Art no 9.
4. Janowitz N (15 July 2021). "How the US exported a Bloods and Crips gang war to Belize". Vice. New York.
5. Warnecke-Berger H (2019). Politics and Violence in Central America and the Caribbean. Switzerland: Palgrave Macmillan Cham. doi:10.1007/978-3-319-89782-0. ISBN 978-3-319-89781-3. LCCN 2018942510.
6. Baird A (2024). From South Central to Southside: Gang Transnationalism, Masculinity, and Disorganized Violence in Belize City. Philadelphia, Pennsylvania: Temple University Press. ISBN 9781439923351. LCCN 2023059602.
7. Bunker RJ, ed. (2013). Criminal Insurgencies in Mexico and the Americas: The Gangs and Cartels Wage War. London: Routledge. ISBN 978-0-415-53375-1. LCCN 2016438196.
8. Young M (2019). King DM (ed.). Belize City Community Gang Assessment (Report). Washington, DC: IDB. doi:10.18235/0001860.
9. Krylova Y, Rico D (2023). Regional Hubs for Illicit Trade in Central America: Panama, Belize, and Guatemala (Report). Arlington, Virginia: TraCCC.
