= Belize Police Department =

National police agency

- Common name: Belize Police
- Abbreviation: BPD
- Motto: Working in Partnership with the community for a safer Belize.

Agency overview
- Formed: 1886
- Employees: 1,255

Jurisdictional structure
- Governing body: Ministry of Home Affairs
- General nature: Civilian police

Operational structure
- Headquarters: Belize City
- Sworn members: 1,073
- Unsworn members: 141
- Elected officer responsible: Hon. Kareem Musa., Minister of Home Affairs
- Agency executive: Chester Williams, Commissioner of Police

Facilities
- Stations: Area Headquarters: 5 Division Headquarters: Stations: Recruiting Centres:

Website
- Official Site

Law enforcement in Belize is conducted by the Belize Police Department, the country’s national police force. It is headed by a Commissioner and is headquartered in Belmopan.

== History ==
The Belize Police Department is descended from the British Honduras Constabulary (BHC), and started by the burgess family which was established in 1886. Constabulary personnel initially numbered 141 and were recruited in Barbados because local men showed no interest in enlisting. The government assigned the early police the task of preserving law and order in the colony. The Constabulary was at first a paramilitary force, but in 1902, it was made into a civil police force.

The constabulary was reorganized after World War I, when soldiers returning from service abroad (as well as several Barbadians and Jamaicans) joined the force. The force was reorganized again in 1957, when its first commissioner of police instituted modernizing reforms that resulted in the force's present form. During the colonial period, expatriate officers filled all senior posts in the police. But with self-government and then independence, more Belizeans assumed positions of authority. The official name of the force was changed to the Belize National Police in 1973, later the word Force was changed to fit the new vision of the police and it is now known as the Belize Police Department. In the early 1990s, the commissioner and all senior police officers were Belizeans.

As of 1991, the force, which was part of the Ministry of Home Affairs, was the sole organization responsible for policing the country and for managing regular immigration matters. A commissioner of police headed the force. The governor general appointed the commissioner with the concurrence of the prime minister after consultation with the leader of the opposition. The commissioner exercised operational and disciplinary control over the police force.

As of the early 1990s, the police force had an authorized strength of approximately 500, a ratio of about three police to every 1,000 inhabitants. Police operations were divided into three territorial divisions: Eastern, which included Belmopan and Belize City; Central; and Western. The force had a small maritime element that operated six shallow-draft motorboats capable of patrolling coastal waters frequented by smugglers.

The force was also divided into three operational branches: General Duties, Crime Investigation, and Tactical Service. The Tactical Service, formed in 1978, assumed the nonmilitary responsibilities of its predecessor, the Police Special Force, which was incorporated into the Belize Defence Force (BDF).

Police performed their regular duties unarmed, although arms were issued for special duties or in cases of extreme necessity.

Officers' uniforms resembled those of British police forces. Sergeants and lower ranks wore khaki shirts, blue serge trousers with a green seam on both sides, and dark blue peaked caps. Some police investigators were not required to wear uniforms.

During the 1980s, the large increase in drug trafficking greatly challenged the police. Unfortunately, some personnel proved vulnerable to corruption by traffickers, and public confidence in the police suffered from charges of official collusion in the drug trade. Public perceptions of the police also suffered from charges that police sometimes resorted to unnecessary force in their efforts to deal with escalating violent crime. During the late 1980s, police leadership began to focus on both problems, expressing a willingness to pursue every allegation of malpractice and to rid the police of unworthy personnel. Penalties for official violators of criminal statutes also increased.

== Training ==
The police underwent training at the Police Training School in Belmopan. In sixteen-week programs, recruits studied general police duties and procedures, criminal law, evidence, traffic management, and firearms. Senior police officers attended a ten-week command course run by the British police in Britain. There were a small number of women police in the force, and the first woman was promoted to the rank of inspector in 1989. All personnel were subject to transfer anywhere in the country.

== Strength ==
On 31 March 2008, the Belize Police Department maintained 1,073 sworn officers and 141 civilian employees.

== Organization ==
The Belize Police Department is headed by a Commissioner and is divided into two main branches, Operational and Administrative, headed by an Assistant Commissioner and the Deputy Commissioner, respectively, which contain the following units:

- Headquarters, National Criminal Investigation Branch – Detective Branch
- Special Branch – handles national security matters
- Operations – which consists of the Anti-Drug Unit and Uniformed Operations, including the Gang Suppression Unit and the Mobile Interdiction Team.
  - Uniformed operations consists of Community Policing, the Special Patrol Unit, and the National Traffic Branch.
- Eastern Division
- Management Services, which consists of the following:
  - Internal Affairs
- National Prosecuting Branch
- Planning Unit and Inspections
- Personnel Officer
- Administration
- Chaplain, Welfare and Sports
- Police Information and Technology unit (PITU)
- Training Director
- Training Academic

== Ranks ==
The Belize Police Department ranks are listed in descending order:

- Commissioner of Police
- Deputy Commissioner
- Assistant Commissioners
- Senior Superintendents
- Superintendents
- Assistant Superintendents
- Inspectors
- Sergeants
- Corporals
- Constables

== Operations ==
On 30 April 2012, the Belize Police raided John McAfee's property in Orange Walk Town, The raid was conducted by the Gang Suppression Unit. A GSU press release stated that McAfee was arrested for unlicensed drug manufacturing and possession of an unlicensed weapon. He was released without charge. In 2012, Belize police spokesman Raphael Martinez confirmed that he was not convicted nor charged but only suspected.

On 12 November 2012, Belize police started a search for McAfee as a "person of interest" in connection to the murder of American expatriate Gregory Viant Faull. Faull was found dead of a gunshot wound on 11 November 2012, at his home on the island of Ambergris Caye, the largest island in Belize. Faull was a neighbour of McAfee. No one has yet been formally charged. In a November 2012 interview with Wired, McAfee said that he has always been afraid police would kill him and thus refused their routine questions; he has since been evading the Belizean authorities. Belize's prime minister Dean Barrow called McAfee "extremely paranoid, even bonkers". McAfee fled Belize when he was sought for questioning concerning the murder.

== See also ==
- Gang Suppression Unit – branch of the BPD
- Crooks Report – 2008 report on the BPD
- Law enforcement by country
- List of countries and dependencies by number of police officers
- List of killings by law enforcement officers in Belize – including many by the BPD
- List of cases of police brutality in Belize – including many by the BPD
