= Carnival in Belize =

Annual festival

- Observed by: Belize
- Significance: Celebration of life using astounding colors
- Date: Mid-September
- Frequency: annual between September 10 and September 21

Carnival in Belize is the celebration of Carnival with a "fusion of street theatre, music, costume and dance." More broadly, Carnival is a "collective expression of the perceptions, meanings, aspirations, and struggles engendered by the material conditions of social life and informed by the cultural traditions of the group." These perspectives are a challenge to classic definitions which identify carnival origins in Europe as 'pagan' practices. However, pre-Lenten carnival practices in Belize are of mixed ‘origins’ involving various aspects of Maya, African, and European influences.

== History of Carnival in Belize City ==
When we think of the month of September one word resonates in the hearts of every Belizean— "Celebration"!. This historical event was adapted in 1975 when five free spirited women gave birth to this movement. Ms. June, Ms. Alice, Ms. Crystal, Ms. Maude and Ms. Myrtle all got together on a Sunday as they had done on several occasions before that and came up with a why and how to "spice up the tenth of September celebrations". Calling themselves the Belize Women for Cultural Preservation, they instilled the idea of using their children as an example by parading through the streets of Belize City and their children brought along friends thereafter making the parade grew larger year after year. In the 1980s the Belize Women for Culture Preservation were assigned a task to display Belize's culture in Miami, Florida. At that time the costumes were wretched long skirts so when they returned to Belize, they demanded costumes that would keep them cool in the ninety degree weather. Thereafter, revising the costumes. In subsequent years, Carnival costume bottoms shortened from the modest ankle length to conservative knee length to the provocative bikini length, influenced by the Caribbean.

== Carnival Day ==
In the month of September we celebrate our forefathers as we pay respect to them; we celebrate our nationality by being patriots; and most importantly, we celebrate our independence as one nation. Despite the many festivities held throughout the month such as the Belize National Song Competition, Belikin Fest, Expo, King and Queen Competition, the Queen of the Bay Pageant, and after 10 years the Miss Belize Universe Pageant has resurfaced in 2016. The jouvert is an essential part of celebrating carnival in Belize because it is held in the morning/day break and it involves participants being covered from head to toe in mud, paint, powder or chocolate "baccahanal-ing" through the streets of Belize City. Jouvert is the pre-carnival bash to symbolize the start of Carnival Day. The day of Carnival never has a set date each year however, it is always held after the tenth of September and before Independence Day. On this day we go dancing, gyrating their bodies and whining to the sweet Soca music through the streets displaying our amazingly beautiful and colorful costumes with such excitement on our faces. This is the day all the mass camps such as "Jump Street Posse", "Black Pearl", "Titans and " Mother Nature", just to name a few, have been preparing and waiting for. Thereafter the carnival concludes at one of the public parks in Belize City's North side or at Marion Jones Stadium Complex where an after party follows with local entertainers performing on stage.

== See also ==
- Carnival
