= Belizean Americans =

Americans of Belizean birth or descent

Total population
- 65,946 (2019) 54,925 (2010); 37,688 (2000); 21,205 (1990)

Regions with significant populations
- New York City, Boston, Philadelphia, Chicago, Milwaukee, Washington, D.C., North Georgia, South Florida, Minneapolis, New Orleans, Tulsa, Houston, Seattle, Denver and Los Angeles

Languages
- Predominantly Kriol; English (American and Belizean), Garifuna, Spanish, Spanglish

Religion
- Predominantly Protestantism: but also Catholicism; Rastafari

Related ethnic groups
- Afro-Caribbean Americans, Kriols, Garinagu, Mestizos, Indians, African diaspora, Black people, Hispanic and Latino Americans

Belizean Americans are Americans who are of Belizean ancestry. These ancestors might be from Belize or of its diaspora.

== Diaspora ==
About one out of every three Belizeans now live overseas and outside of Belize; the majority have migrated to Anglophone countries, especially the United States, where there are some 54,925 Belizeans, and the United Kingdom, with around 3,000 Belizeans. Smaller numbers now live in Canada.

Kriols and other ethnic groups are emigrating mostly to the United States, but also to the United Kingdom and other developed nations for better opportunities. Based on the latest U.S. Census, Belizeans in the United States are primarily of the Kriol and Garinagu ethnic groups of African, Native American and European descent, who are considered Black in the United States. In 1990, there were about 10,000 Belizean American citizens in the United States.

== Notable people ==
- Avery August (born 1966), doctor and scientist
- Andrew Ballen (born 1973), entrepreneur and producer
- Simone Biles (born 1997), gymnast
- Pi'erre Bourne (born 1993), producer and rapper
- Colman Domingo (born 1969), actor
- Zee Edgell (1940–2020), author
- Arlen Escarpeta (born 1981 or 1982), actor
- Max Faget (1921–2004), mechanical engineer
- Noel Felix (born 1981), basketball player
- Kareem Ferguson (born 1986), actor
- O.T. Genasis (born 1987), rapper
- Erik Griffin (born 1988), comedian
- Houston (born 1983), singer
- Marion Jones (born 1975), track and field athlete and basketball player
- Ernest Lyon (1860–1938), minister, educator and diplomat
- Chito Martínez (born 1965), baseball player
- Michael Salazar (born 1992), footballer
- Tony Rocha (born 1993) footballer
- Kenneth Medwood (born 1987), track and field athlete
- Nigel Miguel (born 1963), actor
- Rakeem Nuñez-Roches (born 1993), American football player
- Joe Pacheco (born 1985), mixed martial artist
- Milt Palacio (born 1978), basketball player
- Arlie Petters (born 1964), physicist
- Verno Phillips (born 1969), boxer
- Marion Reneau (born 1977), mixed martial artist
- Makonnen Sheran (born 1989), rapper
- Shyne (born 1978), rapper
- Lisa Tucker (born 1989), singer and actress
- Jarrell Miller (born July 15, 1988), professional boxer and former kickboxer

== See also ==
- Demographics of Belize
- Belize–United States relations
