= List of cases of police brutality in Belize =

This is a list of cases of police brutality in Belize since the 2000s. This list includes non-fatal cases of excessive or unwarranted use of force by military or non-military law enforcement officers, whether proven or merely alleged. This list does not include fatal cases. (Note: In Belize, military officers sometimes act in a domestic law enforcement capacity. See List of killings by law enforcement officers in Belize for fatal cases of police brutality. Complete lists of cases of police brutality in Belize are not officially published, so this list relies on media and unofficial reports. Notes and short citations provided in Nb columns. Short citations in the form A yy refer to Amnesty International, yyyy report, sec Belize. Short citations in the form S yy refer to US State Department, report for yyyy, sec Belize. Short citations in the form Am yy refer to Amandala, review for yyyy (or for split reviews, Am yyi refer to the first part of the review, Am yyii refer to second part, and so on).)

== 2020s ==
Date	Name (age)	District (place)	Description	Ruling	Nb
Sep 2023	James Efrimea	Belize (Belize)	Efrimea, a Sierra Leone citizen, contended he was illegally detained, since he was still imprisoned despite having served his sentence (for an immigration offence) and having provided funds for his deportation. Efrimea accused an immigration officer of extortion.	?	(Note: S 23; "Sierra Leonean remains in custody pending repatriation". News 5. 8 September 2023. Surnamed Erimea in S 23.)
Aug 2023	several detainees	Belize (Belize)	Several of 45 allegedly gang-affiliated men detained during a 30-day state of emergency from 28 July claimed corrections and law enforcement officers had denied them access to legal counsel.	?	
Mar 2023	Abi Aladdin	Belize (Hattieville)	Aladdin, a Haitian citizen seeking refuge, was deported to Guatemala without being allowed to appear in court. Director of Immigration (Debra Estrada) stated 'there was an order for Aladdin's removal.'	?	
Mar 2023	two people	Orange Walk (?)	A pregnant Haitian couple were allegedly denied food and water while detained by immigration officers, requiring hospitalisation. Immigration Minister (Eamon Courtenay) denied the accusation, stating they 'were treated appropriately.'	?	
Apr 2022	Shamar Foster	Belize (Belize)	Foster, a tour guide and student, was physically abused by police constable Albert Martinez and police corporal Linda Chan at the municipal airport. Foster claimed Martinez accosted him for being a young black man who did not 'look like a tour guide,' slapped him in the face, threatened to use his firearm, and accused Foster of assaulting an officer. Witnesses claimed Martinez smelled strongly of alcohol.	Martinez and Chan disciplined	(Note: S 22; Am 24ii; "Outrageous police brutality caught on camera". 7 News. 4 April 2022. Foster awarded $25,000 in damages in 2024 (Am 24ii).)
Mar 2022	Cherisse Halsall	Belize (San Pedro)	Halsall, a 7 News reporter, was forcibly removed by police officers from the CARICOM–SICA Summit, per the Press Office director's instructions. 7 News called the incident 'a flagrant and foul muzzling of the free press.'	?	(Note: S 22; "Press Office Director chastises Channel 7's Cherisse Halsall". 7 News. 1 March 2022. Other local media organisations (except News 5) were likewise denied certain access while covering the summit (S 22).)
Jul 2021	David Small	Cayo (Santa Elena)	Amateur video showed police officers Wilton Montero and Jerome Ingram abusing an unarmed Small who was in handcuffs and appeared unconscious.	Montero and Ingram disciplined and charged; trial outcome not clear	
May 2021	Vejea Alvarez	Orange Walk (Orange Walk)	Alvarez, a Love FM radio reporter, was assaulted and falsely detained and charged by police sergeant Evaristo Cobb while covering a protest by nurses at Northern Regional Hospital. Cobb threatened to beat Alvarez if he did not exit the hospital, punched him in the chest, detained him at the police station, and again threatened Alvarez when he complained.	Cobb disciplined	(Note: S 21; "Journalist arrested in the line of duty". 7 News. 7 May 2021. Corporal Gaspar Tuz and constable Walter Leonardo also disciplined (S 21).)
Feb 2021	various inmates	Belize (Hattieville)	Amateur video showed corrections officers at Central Prison pepper spraying handcuffed inmates directly in the face, forcing an inmate to ingest large quantities of water until they vomited, and a paralysed inmate suffering from bedsores. The prison governor told press 'the mistreatment featured in the video did not occur at the prison.' The HRC called the appointment of visiting justices to the Prison as mandated by law.	?	
Jan 2021	one teen (19)	Cayo (Succotz)	A 19 year old woman reported that police constable Edgar Teul sexually assaulted her thrice while she waited to sign bail documents at the police station for the release of her common law husband.	Teul dismissed and charged; trial outcome not clear	
22 Jul 2020	various unionists	Belize (Belize)	The dismissal of 36 stevedores prompted a peaceful protest by Christian Workers' Union members, which was met with force by GSU police officers, who used tear gas and rubber bullets to disperse the crowd, injuring several men.	Commanding officer dismissed	(Note: S 20; "Port of Belize fires 36 workers, mayhem ensues". News 5. 22 July 2020.; "3 Senior officers put on admin leave for Port shooting". Amandala. 24 July 2020.; "Chaos at the Port, police turn on peaceful protestors". 7 News. 22 July 2020.; "Day of outrage!". Amandala. 23 July 2023.; "Top cops—Dawson, Arzu and Lorenzo—suspended for 2 months". Amandala. 7 August 2020. Dated March 2020 by S 20.)
Apr 2020	two people	Belize (Belize)	A man and a woman with mental disabilities were allegedly forced into a sexual act by police officers Jason Shaw, Leslie Martinez, and Anthony Villamil, who then filmed the act and released it to the public.	Three officers charged; trial outcome not clear	
18 Mar 2020	100s people	Belize (Belize)	During two states of emergency (30-day from 18 March, and 90-day from 6 July), there were reports that police officers and soldiers used excessive force on residents, damaged property, and unjustly targeted law-abiding residents. Upon the second SOE's expiry on 6 October, 110 persons were still detained awaiting trial.	?	(Note: S 20; "Are police abusing SOE?". 7 News. 6 April 2020.; "Police beat down San Martin residents". News 5. 6 April 2020. Michelle Trapp (a lawyer) requested judicial review of government's failure to set up a tribunal to review SOE cases, as required by law (S 20).)
Jan 2020	Francis Nolberto	Belize (Belize)	Nolberto claimed police officers scalded him with hot water and pulled out his hair when he was picked up to be questioned about a stolen mobile phone.	?	(Note: S 20; "Man claims cops tortured him with hot water". 7 News. 3 February 2020. 'There was no response on the part of the BPD' (S 20).)
Jan 2020	Rupert Lulofs	Belize (Hattieville)	Lulofs, a South African national, alleged he was illegally detained at Central Prison beyond his seven-day sentence for immigration offences. Prison authorities failed to release him until February 2021.	?	(Note: S 21; "South African national stranded in Belize". Love News. 18 February 2021. Lulofs filed civil suit in February 2021 (S 21).)

== 2010s ==
Date	Name (age)	District (place)	Description	Ruling	Nb
30 Jun 2019	Ralph Gillett	Belize (Caye Caulker)	A passenger on public transport refused to sit next to Gillett, whom she believed was gay. A verbal confrontation ensued, and turned physical. Responding police officers physically assaulted Gillett by slapping him and placing him in a submission hold, per video footage.	Investigative outcome not clear	(Note: S 19; Am 19iii; "Police officer used unsanctioned chokehold to subdue PC Gillett". News 5. 3 July 2019.; "UNIBAM Exec. Dir. says PC Gillett's rights were infringed". News 5. 1 July 2019.; "Cop gets 'woman fum-fum' aboard water taxi". Amandala. 1 July 2019. Gillett (a police constable) faced internal disciplinary charges (S 19). Special Envoy for Women & Children, Kim Barrow, stated BPD should have offered him protection and support, asserting 'violence of this kind has no place in our society' (S 19).)
1 Jan 2019	Jamir Leal, various people	Belize (San Pedro)	Police constable Tyrell Rowley allegedly used excessive force to disperse a group fight. Footage showed Rowley kicking an unconscious Jamir Leal on the ground.	Rowley charged; not convicted	
Jul 2018	two minors	?	Two male minors were allegedly severely beaten by police officers after being detained (for allegedly stealing two guns from a security firm) and handcuffed.	Investigative outcome not clear	
Nov 2017	two women	Independence, Stann Creek	A Belizean and a Salvadoran woman accused three police officers of raping them in a police station after they were removed from a transit bus to be searched for drugs.	Investigative outcome not clear	(Note: S 17; Am 17ii; "3 Cops accused of raping 2 women in police station". Amandala. 13 November 2017.; "COMPOL still mum on allegation of station rape". 7 News. 5 December 2017. Officers remained on active duty despite ongoing investigation (S 17). Located in Belize City by S 17.)
6 Sep 2017	Marisol Amaya	Orange Walk (Tower Hill)	Amaya, a journalist, was physically assaulted by a police officer while covering a political event. Upon reporting the incident, the Minister of Home Affairs stated, 'The Police Department have a job to do, and in that situation, we have always asked the media to stay a distance away from the situation.'	Investigative outcome not clear	
May 2017	three journalists	Cayo (Belmopan)	Two members of the press were physically assaulted (and a third threatened) by Brian Audinette, a Serjeant at Arms, while covering a protest in Parliament.	Serjeant suspended	(Note: S 17; "Mayor says Yellowman should face consequences for what he did". 7 News. 26 May 2017.; "Macebearer Yellowman under fire". Amandala. 25 May 2017. Serjeant eventually suspended, but not immediately censured (S 17).)
Apr 2017	four people	Belize (San Pedro)	As two women were being detained by police constables Norman Coye and Darnell Madrill, civilians gathered to demand they minimise their allegedly excessive use of force, whereupon officers physically attacked a bystander recording the event as well as his brother. One of the men was shot in the legs when the officers fired warning shots into the air and ground.	Two officers charged; trial outcome not clear	
Oct 2016	two officers	?	Two female GSU police officers reported they had been sexually harassed by their male colleagues.	Investigative outcome not clear	(Note: S 16; "G.S.U. senior personnel demand apology over alleged sexual harassment allegations". News 5. 3 November 2016.; "Whylie rejects GSU narrative alleging personal interest in internal probe". 7 News. 1 December 2016.. Labelled sexual assault by S 16.)
26 Aug 2016	Julius Espat, various journalists	Cayo (Belmopan)	A number of journalists and Julius Espat, a member of the Opposition, were forcibly pushed out of Parliament building by police officers, allegedly per the Speaker's instructions. Concerns about such treatment were raised.	?	
Aug 2016	Tyrone Meighan, Shaquille Meighan	Belize (Belize)	The Meighans, two brothers, claimed GSU police officers shot and wounded them both in the leg while in detention following a gang raid.	Investigative outcome not clear	
May 2016	one girl (14)	?	A 14 year old girl alleged police officer Mark Flowers (GSU commander) had raped her twice. She was five months pregnant when she made the report.	Flowers charged; not convicted	
Feb 2016	one girl (8)	Belize (Belize)	An 8 year old girl alleged police constable Darren Martinez had sexually assaulted her.	Martinez convicted, 12 years' prison	
2016	one man	Toledo (?)	A man claimed police officers beat him when he sought to intervene in the beating of a second person by said officers. The man alleged he was left on the roadside, where he was found the following day suffering from internal injuries. His family claimed the Police Department's internal affairs delayed in dealing with the matter when they reported it.	Investigative outcome not clear	
Aug 2015	Donovan Usher, Giovanni Murrillo, Jerome Bowen	Belize (Belize)	Usher, Murrillo, and Bowen, fishermen, went missing while at sea. Family claimed coast guards were involved due to antagonistic previous encounters.	Investigative outcome not clear	(Note: S 15; "Coast Guard and family of missing men make peace". 7 News. 4 September 2015.; "Coast Guard detained for men missing at sea". 7 News. 9 September 2015. Police investigation led to detention of three coast guards in 2016 (S 16).)
Apr 2015	Andres Rodriguez	Orange Walk (Orange Walk)	Rodriguez claimed Edward Swift, a police special constable, beat him while detaining him, leaving him with several injuries (including two large cuts to the head).	Constable suspended and charged; not convicted	(Note: S 15; Pham 2024; "Police brutality caught on camera in OW". 7 News. 14 April 2015.; "Wife, using cellphone, records cops beating her husband". Amandala. 16 April 2015.; "OW cops guilty of beating up Andres Rodriguez". News 5. 16 April 2015. An officer who witnessed but did not stop the beating was internally disciplined (S 15). Dated June 2015 in S 15.)
Aug 2014	various youths	Cayo (Camp Belizario)	Youths at a six-week summer camp at a BDF military base were allegedly disciplined with excessive force by camp personnel. The BDF justified the force used as necessary to control the youths who had allegedly launched a gang war.	?	
May 2014	Elston Arnold (19)	Cayo (Unitedville)	Arnold, a teenager, was allegedly shot and wounded by police officers Maxwell Valerio, Jesus Marroquin, Ernesto Budna, and Ricky Valencia.	Four officers charged; trial outcome not clear	(Note: S 14; "4 Police officers charged in connection with the shooting of Unitedville youth". News 5. 6 June 2014.; "Cayo cop shoots teenager in the back!". Amandala. 30 May 2014. Dated June 2014 by S 14.)
27 May 2013	one man	?	A man claimed GSU police officers beat him in his home after entering and searching it without a warrant, and claimed officers 'told him that had he been alone, they would have killed him.'	?	
Jan 2013	Bert Nicholas	Belize (Caye Caulker)	Nicholas, a tour guide, was allegedly severely beaten (requiring brain surgery) by tourism police officers, who then reportedly forced tourists who had recorded the act to destroy the footage.	Investigative outcome not clear	
Dec 2012	four people	Belize (San Pedro)	Four people were physically assaulted in a bar by two off duty police officers, Mark Young and Sherifa Young, after one of the latter was confronted for making unwanted advances. The altercation continued outside the bar, where three of the four were arrested and charged.	One officer suspended; investigative outcome not clear	
Feb 2012	one man	?	A man alleged police officers beat him after apprehension in connection with a 2011 shooting of a police officer.	?	(Note: S 12. No complaint filed with internal affairs nor ombudsman by end 2012, despite former reaching out to individual (S 12).)
Jan 2012	one woman	Toledo (Jalacte)	A Honduran national claimed she was raped by one police officer and four BDF soldiers while crossing the border from Santa Cruz, Peten.	Investigative outcome not clear	(Note: S 12; "Serious rape allegations against lawmen in the south". 7 News. 24 January 2012.; "Alleged PG rape by B.D.F./Police investigated". News 5. 25 January 2012. Case complicated by complainant leaving country and potentially not returning for trial (S 12).)
16 Nov 2011	two foreigners	Cayo (Benque Viejo)	Two foreigners alleged that immigration officials at the border crossing extorted 10,000 Mexican pesos (circa 715 USD) from them and sexually harassed one of them.	Investigative outcome not clear	
Aug 2011	Glenn Tillett	Cayo (Belmopan)	Tillett claimed he was wrongfully detained for a prolonged period, denied needed medical care, then released sans charge by police officers, in connection with a robbery allegedly committed by a relative at a foreign embassy.	?	
29 Aug 2011	various bystanders	Belize (Belize)	Attendees at the funeral of Charles Woodeye, a murder victim who allegedly had had gang ties, were reportedly injured with pepper spray, rubber bullets, and a baseball bat by GSU police officers.	?	
Jul 2011	one girl (13)	?	A police constable was suspected of raping a 13 year old girl who subsequently became pregnant.	Investigative outcome not clear	
Jan 2011	one policeman	Cayo (Belmopan)	Noel Leal, an assistant commissioner of police (third in command at the Department), was internally investigated for sexually assaulting a female police officer. The case was forwarded to prosecutors but later dropped as the complainant requested no further action.	Forwarded to DPP; case dropped	
May 2010	Elvin Torres	Belize (Western Hwy)	Torres, an electrical mechanic, was allegedly wounded by six police constables at a checkpoint on Mile Four. They reportedly believed Torres had fired shots as he drove past.	Six constables charged; charges against four dropped; two acquitted	(Note: S 10; Pham 2024; "Pulled up and got beat up". 7 News. 12 May 2010.; "They beat down Torres". 7 News. 14 May 2010. Constables were Kareem Fuller, Fernando Franzua, Tyrone Baizar, Mark Martinez, Glennwayne Grant, Henry Nunez (Pham 2024).)
Apr 2010	Steven Buckley	Belize (Belize)	Buckley was shot in the head and wounded (partially paralysed) in a vehicle by police inspector Dennis Lopez. The latter claimed he fired by accident, contrary to eyewitness accounts.	Lopez charged; not convicted	(Note: S 10; Pham 2024; "Police shooting victim, Steven Buckley, back from throes of death". News 5. 3 June 2010.; "Senior cop on attempted murder charge". NationNews. 5 June 2010. Victim filed civil suit by 2011 (S 11).)
Mar 2010	Emerson Ciego	Stann Creek (Dangriga)	Ciego, a fisherman, was shot in the back by a police officer. The latter claimed the former resisted arrest, but witnesses claimed the fisherman was fleeing when shot.	Internal affairs recommend charges; no charges filed	
Feb 2010	Juan Perez	Belize (San Pedro)	Perez, a vegetable vendor, was allegedly kidnapped, assaulted, had his boat searched, and was robbed of $350 by police constable Derrick Gideon, BDF private Justin Casimiro, and a civilian.	Soldier cleared; officer charged; not convicted	(Note: S 10; Pham 2024; "Police & BDF soldier jailed for San Pedro assault". 7 News. 23 February 2010.; "Victim of San Pedro attack speaks". 7 News. 24 February 2010.; "BDF, police officer and civilian remanded to Hattieville for kidnapping". San Pedro Sun. 23 February 2010. Dated March 2010 by S 10. Soldier cleared by BDF 'because he reportedly remained on the wharf where the vessel was moored and did not assist his confederate on the boat' (S 10).)

== 2000s ==
Date	Name (age)	District (place)	Description	Ruling	Nb
Dec 2009	one boy (14)	?	A teenager claimed he was beaten and sexually assaulted while in police custody.	Investigative outcome not clear	
Nov 2009	one waitress	Cayo (Santa Elena)	A waitress was allegedly sexually assaulted by on duty police corporal Sam Bonilla.	Corporal charged; charges dropped	
Aug 2009	one minor	?	A youth claimed he was taken to a burglary crime scene and beaten by a police officer before being charged for the burglary.	Investigative outcome not clear	
Jul 2009	Ronlee Petillo	Belize (Belize)	Petillo alleged two police officers detained him, drove him to a secluded area of Western Highway, and used excessive force on him (including beatings and a gunshot to the head).	?	
Feb 2009	one man	Belize (Belize)	A man alleged three police officers attacked him and left him bleeding on the street with injuries that required hospitalisation.	?	(Note: S 09. Man indicated he would file case with police's internal affairs, but latter reported no such case by end 2009 (S 09).)
2008	one man	?	A man was shot and wounded in the back of the head by a police constable.	Constable charged; not convicted	
May 2008	Rhold Henry	Sann Creek (Dangriga)	Henry, a hospital patient, was beaten with a shotgun by a police officer.	Officer charged; not convicted	(Note: S 08; Pham 2024; "2 Cops interdicted for brutality". 7 News. 27 May 2008.; "Beaten by cops in his hospital bed!!". Amandala. 23 May 2008.; "Sergeant demoted for neglect of duty". News 5. 30 July 2008.; "Dangriga man says cops beat him in hospital bed". News 5. 21 May 2008. Supervising officer demoted and fined (S 08).)
Mar 2008	Yadira Dominquez	Orange Walk (Orange Walk)	A woman was allegedly detained outside her home and beaten by two police officers, requiring hospitalisation for cuts and bruises to her neck and hands.	One officer found guilty, transferred, fined	(Note: S 08; "Yadira Dominquez says an Orange Walk policeman abused her". 7 News. 26 March 2008. Second officer not investigated (S 08).)
Feb 2008	one girl (14)	Cayo (San Ignacio)	A teenager reported she was extorted and raped by police corporal Joel Grinage.	Corporal arrested and charged; not convicted	(Note: S 08; Pham 2024; "San Ignacio cop hit with rape, extortion charges". Amandala. 26 February 2008.; "Corporal Grinage charged for carnal knowledge & extortion". 7 News. 22 February 2008. Constable not corporal in Pham 2024.)
Dec 2007	Ryan Requena	Belize (San Pedro)	Requena claimed police officers detained him after planting cannabis in his home, then beat him with batons and rubber hoses, and pepper sprayed him.	Tribunal convicts and fines two officers, acquits three	
Sep 2007	one girl (14)	Stann Creek (Dangriga)	A teenager alleged she was raped by a police constable.	Constable convicted; reversed on appeal	
17 Sep 2007	one person	?	A man claimed a police corporal used excessive force against him while in custody.	Corporal charged; case dismissed	(Note: S 07; S 08. Dismissed for lack of evidence (S 08).)
Aug 2007	two people	Belize (Ladyville)	A man claimed police officers tied a rope around his waist and threw him into sea to torture him to obtain information on a recent theft of the Home Affairs Minister's computers. Similarly, a mother claimed officers beat her son in a bid to obtain information on the same.	Investigation closed on lack of evidence	
18 May 2007	1000s protestors	Cayo (Belmopan)	Police officers used tear gas and rubber bullets on thousands of demonstrators gathered to protest a government guarantee of a firm's private debt. The crowd had allegedly thrown rocks and other items at police.	?	(Note: S 07; "Tear gas released on protestors; forces adjournement of the House". 7 News. 18 May 2007.; "How peace erupted into chaos on Independence Hill". 7 News. 22 May 2007.; "How we are governed". Independent Reformer. Vol. 2, no. 21. 25 May 2007. No serious injuries and several arrests of protestors reported (S 07).)
5 Nov 2006	Goldburn Miller, Elbert Anderson, Ashton Myers	Belize (Belize)	Miller, Anderson, and Myers (siblings) were allegedly beaten in their home by police officers (including constable Dennison Longsworth) with batons, giving the first a broken arm, and the second seizures which required hospitalisation. Officers detained and charged the brothers with obstruction.	Longsworth internally charged; tribunal dismisses case	(Note: S 06; S 08; "Brothers claim police broke their hands". 7 News. 6 November 2006. Dismissed for lack of evidence (S 08).)
19 Sep 2006	Justin Stuart	?	Stuart was allegedly beaten by police officers until his ears bled, then tortured with a plastic bag over his head (tightened around his neck), and kicked repeatedly in the stomach.	Internal investigation dropped	(Note: S 06; S 07. Dropped in 2007 after authorities could not locate two key witnesses (S 07).)
23 Aug 2006	Elario Elijio (61)	Belize (Belize)	Elijio was beaten by police officers when he tried to intervene in his son's arrest.	Investigation clears officers	
Feb 2006	Lisa Lauriano, Bernadine Reid	Belize (Hattieville)	Lauriano and Reid were allegedly tortured with stun guns by nine corrections officers.	Investigative findings differed; no action taken	(Note: S 06; "Prison officials deny physical abuse of inmates". News 5. 22 February 2006. Internal investigation found 'the two inmates had a history of unruly behaviour and assault and often had to be physically restrained to prevent them from harming others;' but Ombudsman found use of force excessive and recommended officers be punished (S 06).)
Jul 2005	John Faux, Frans Faux, Mark Faux	Stann Creek (Dangriga)	A father (J Faux) and his two sons were allegedly beaten and tortured via electric shock by police officers while detained without charge on suspicion of withholding evidence regarding a bank robbery.	Case settled; no disciplinary action	(Note: A 06; S 05; S 08; "Date set for constitutional motion on alleged police torture". News 5. 7 February 2006.; "Stann Creek family alleges torture by police". News 5. 26 July 2005. Fauxes settled with Solicitor General, were compensated (S 08). An accused officer was promoted after case was filed, and later involved in another instance of misconduct (S 08).)
20 Jan 2005	Mark Butler, other unionists	Belize (Hattieville)	Members of the Energy Workers' Union, including president Butler, were detained by police officers while en route to a demonstration, allegedly for having harmful tools in the vehicle. They were released the same day only when the Leader of the Opposition phoned the police commissioner.	?	
14 Sep 2004	Emile Pinelo	Cayo (San Ignacio)	While arresting him and later at the station, Pinelo was allegedly choked, punched, repeatedly kicked, and beaten by police constables Clayton Marin and Cyril Wade. Pinelo was initially denied medical care, but eventually taken to hospital. Pinelo 'suffered massive internal injuries and required emergency surgery to remove 25 inches of his small intestine.'	Marin and Wade suspended and charged; Marin's charges dismissed; Wade convicted, 5 years' prison	(Note: S 04; Pham 2024; "From policemen to criminals". 7 News. 14 September 2004.; "2 Cops arrested for beating Cayo man". News 5. 14 September 2004. Charges against Marin dropped in 2005 (S 05). Court of Appeals reaffirmed Wade's conviction in October 2006 (S 06).)
30 Mar 2004	Pedro Guzman	Cayo (San Ignacio)	Guzman was forced into a car at gunpoint by an inebriated police constable Julio Shal, who then threatened him with it, eventually shooting Guzman in the hand.	Shal arrested and charged; charges dismissed	(Note: S 04; Pham 2024; "'Bad policing' lands cop in jail". 7 News. 31 March 2004.; "Cayo cop charged with attempted murder". News 5. 31 March 2004. Charges dismissed on 17 July 2006 after Guzman refused to testify (S 06).)
Dec 2003	one woman	Belize (Belize)	A woman reported police constable Adrian Lopez arrested her for a traffic violation, drove her to a deserted airfield, and tried to rape here before she escaped.	Lopez arrested and charged; trial outcome not clear	(Note: S 03; "On duty cop charged with rape attempt". News 5. 22 December 2003. In 2004, DPP 'had no record of charges against police constable Adrian Lopez' (S 04).)
24 Aug 2003	Timotheo Cano, Lincoln Cardinez	Stann Creek (Dangriga)	Cano and Cardinez were allegedly illegally detained by police superintendent Ewart Itza (and subordinate officers), who then pistol-whipped Cano and beat Cardinez, denied them medical care, detained them overnight, and released them sans charges the next morning.	Itza suspended and charged; not convicted	(Note: A 04; S 03; Pham 2024; "Superintendent Itza faces more charges". News 5. 5 December 2003. Itza acquitted in 2004, but prosecutors appealed; appeal outcome not clear as of end of 2006 (S 04; S 05; S 06).)
Jan 2003	Antoinette Moore, Michael Flores	Stann Creek (Dangriga)	Moore (human rights lawyer) and Flores (radio journalist) were arrested and charged with drug-related offences by police officers. Concerns were raised that the charges may have been meant to intimidate them for protesting police brutality.	?	(Note: A 04; "Rights activists busted for weed, vow to fight". News 5. 27 January 2003.; "Magistrate: Moore insisted on being charged". News 5. 29 January 2003. Granted bail; due in court in January 2004 (A 04).)
Dec 2002	one person	Belize (Hattieville)	An escapee from Central prison, injured while being recaptured, was beaten in hospital (per witnesses) by corrections officers George Myvett and Joshua Trapp.	Myvett and Trapp dismissed	
27 Sep 2002	three men	Toledo (Otoxha)	Three villagers were shot and wounded in a confrontation with police officers Eaton Williams and John Mas, while the latter (with two forestry officers) tried to confiscate illegally logged mahogany. The machete-wielding villagers allegedly formed a mob of 30 which advanced on the officers.	Inquiry clears officers	(Note: A 03; S 02; "Police kill 2 in Toledo logging dispute". News 5. 27 September 2002.; "Police claim narrow escape in Otoxha". News 5. 30 September 2002. Plus two villagers shot and killed (A 03). Dated October 2002 in A 03.)
8 Sep 2002	Galindo Perez, Juan Mendoza	Belize (Belize)	Perez and Mendoza were kidnapped and turned over to a suspected drug gang by police constable Martin Castillo and on patrol soldiers Juan Jimenez and Urbanos Teck. Castillo and the soldiers were arrested while en route to abduct a third person.	Castillo charged; not convicted	(Note: S 02; Pham 2024; "Policeman, 2 soldiers charged in kidnapping". News 5. 11 September 2002.; "Kidnappers thwarted in 2nd snatch attempt". News 5. 11 September 2002. Soldiers' charges dropped after they explained they thought they were conducting legitimate police business (S 02).)
27 May 2002	ca 16 inmates	Belize (Hattieville)	Four inmates were shot and severely injured by corrections officers at Central Prison for a failed escape attempt, requiring hospitalisation. Officers reportedly beat them with rifles and batons, kicked and punched them, then (officer Ean Daley) methodically shot each at close range with a pistol, then again beat them. '[A] dozen other prisoners were severely beaten by guards' at the Prison on 28–29 May, per human rights groups.	Daley dismissed; no officer charged	(Note: A 03; S 02; "Four prisoners wounded in escape attempt". News 5. 28 May 2002. Daley had been suspended in 2000 for beating and shooting an inmate; Ombudsman urged Daley be criminally charged (S 02).)
24 Apr 2002	Marcos Sanchez (15), Marlon Gamez (24), 100s protestors	Cayo (Benque Viejo)	During a protest against increased bus fares (200–300 people, including at least 60 schoolchildren), Sanchez and Gamez were shot and injured by police corporal Thomas Flores, with an M16 rifle at close range. Police reportedly used excessive force, sprayed tear gas indiscriminately, made arbirtrary arrests, and beat some detainees.	Internal investigation finds use of force excessive; no officer charged	(Note: A 03; S 02; "Benque riot: 2 protestors shot, 27 cops injured". News 5. 24 April 2002.; "Benquenos search for normalcy after riot". News 5. 25 April 2002. Many officers present not trained in crowd control; government stated 'the confrontational attitude adopted by some demonstrators led to the injuries to both police officers and civilians' (A 03). Use of force excessive by 'several officers;' '[s]everal protesters' charged, but cases postponed indefinitely (S 02).)
5 Mar 2002	two people	Belize (Belize)	The owner of a store and a customer were assaulted by four police officers on patrol as they robbed the store.	Four officers arrested and charged; trial outcome not clear	
4 Sep 2001	Frederick Arzu, John Elijio	Belize (Hattieville)	Arzu and Elijio were lashed four times each with a tamarind whip by corrections officers at Central Prison for escaping.	None	(Note: A 02; "Two captured prisoners receive whipping". News 5. 4 September 2001. Corporal punishment reinstituted in prisons in February 2000 (A 02).)
30 Jul 2001	two protestors	Orange Walk (Orange Walk)	During a protest blocking Tower Hill Bridge, responding police officers and soldiers shot and wounded two protestors, allegedly after some personnel were injured by rocks and bottles.	One soldier suspended; commission of inquiry appointed; inquiry outcome not clear	(Note: S 01; "Two shot during protest over bus schedule". San Pedro Sun. 2 August 2001.; "Bus riders and police battle at Tower Hill Bridge". News 5. 30 July 2001. Rocks and bottles allegedly hurled after tear gas was used on protestors (S 01).)
23 Jul 2001	Francis Westby (17)	Belize (Belize)	Westby was allegedly beaten by police officers who were arresting him, including (per a witness) hitting him several times, pushing his head under water, and beating him while escorting him to their vehicle.	Investigative outcome not clear	
28 Aug 2000	one inmate	Belize (Hattieville)	An inmate was given 12 lashes by corrections officers at Central Prison for stabbing a fellow inmate over $4.	None	(Note: S 00. In accordance with prison rules, after sentencing by a visiting judge, despite prison governor's 31 March disavowal of floggings (S 00).)
27 Aug 2000	Charlie Slusher, Norman Nunez	Orange Walk (Orange Walk)	Slusher and Nunez (on the national football team) were allegedly beaten while handcuffed by police officers while en route to a party.	Three constables charged with wounding; trial outcome not clear	(Note: A 01; S 00; S 01; "Footballers charged in barroom brawl". News 5. 28 August 2000.; "Officers disciplined pending brutality investigation". News 5. 30 August 2000. District inspector James Magdaleno, assistant inspector Eli Salazar suspended; constables Roger Briceno, Mateo Carrillo, A Coc disciplined (S 00). Magdaleno reinstated; Salazar discharged for a separate case of alleged torture; Briceno, Carrillo, Coc charged (S 01).)
Jul 2000	Randolph Miller	Belize (Hattieville)	Miller was allegedly beaten (hand broken) by corrections officers after escaping from Central Prison.	Investigative outcome not clear	
20 May 2000	Thomas Hill	Cayo (Belmopan)	A man (who had brandished a dead snake glued to cardboard) was shot and injured by a police officer on duty at the national agriculture and trade show, despite an order to not shoot.	Officer suspended; investigative outcome not clear	
4 Apr 2000	Darrel Jones	Belize (Hattieville)	Jones was shot by a police officer after escaping Central Prison.	Officer cleared	
17 Mar 2000	three inmates	Belize (Hattieville)	During a riot of 300–400 inmates protesting the Smith and Elijio floggings, three inmates were shot and wounded by corrections officers at Central Prison, requiring hospitalisation.	Forwarded to DPP; outcome not clear	(Note: S 00; "Prison protest leaves one dead, several injured". News 5. 17 March 2000.; "Former inmate tells about prison shooting". News 5. 31 March 2000. Plus one inmate fatally shot (S 00).)
16 Mar 2000	Nehru Smith, Bert Elijio	Belize (Hattieville)	Smith and Elijio were flogged twelve and six times, respectively, with a tamarind whip by corrections officers at Central Prison, both for allegedly stabbing fellow inmates.	None	(Note: A 01; S 00; S 01. After sentencing by a visiting judge (S 01). Corporal punishment reinstituted in prisons in February 2000, but 'used retrospectively as a punishment for crimes committed before it was introduced' (A 01). Minister of Prisons voiced support for and approval of the floggings (S 00). The newly reappointed prison governor stated on 31 March that floggings were necessary but would be dispensed with during his governorship (S 00).)
14 Feb 2000	two people	Orange Walk (Orange Walk)	A BDF soldier and a bystander were shot and injured by a police officer. The soldier and officer were reportedly in a verbal altercation when the former pulled a machete.	Officer suspended; investigative outcome not clear	

== See also ==
- Crooks Report – 2008 green paper on policing in Belize
- List of killings by law enforcement officers in Belize
- Police brutality by country – short surveys of

== Notes and references ==
=== References ===
1. "Year in review". Amandala. Belize City. 2004–2024.
2. "Amnesty International Annual Reports". Amnesty International. 1962–2025.
3. Pham D, Pham G, Pham P, Sikkink K, Thoms OT, Vinck P (30 April 2024). "Belize". TJET Database of Transitional Justice Mechanisms, 1970–2020 (Scholarly database). Toronto: Transitional Justice Evaluation Team.
4. "Country Reports on Human Rights Practices". US State Department. 1977–2025. HathiTrust 000062477. This article incorporates text from this source, which is in the public domain.
