= Community Baboon Sanctuary =

Protected area in Belize

- IUCN category IV (habitat/species management area)
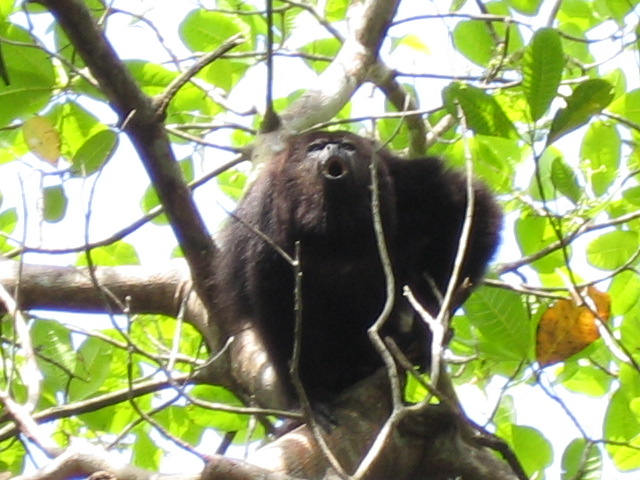
- A black howler monkey at the Community Baboon Sanctuary in Belize
- Interactive map of Community Baboon Sanctuary
- Location: Bermudian Landing, Belize
- Coordinates: 17°33′21.73″N 88°32′5.92″W
- Area: 5,179 ha (12,800 acres)
- Established: 1984
- Governing body: Community Baboon Sanctuary Women's Conservation Group
- Website: howlermonkeybelize.org

The Community Baboon Sanctuary (CBS) is a community-managed protected area in Belize that was established in 1985 to support the conservation of the Yucatán black howler monkey (Alouatta pigra), locally known as the "baboon". Spanning over 5,000 hectares along the Belize River, CBS is managed through a voluntary pledge system by landowners from seven villages in the Belize River Valley. In addition to wildlife protection, the sanctuary promotes sustainable land use, environmental education, and ecotourism as a means to strengthen local livelihoods.

== History ==
The Community Baboon Sanctuary was established in 1985 through a partnership between American primatologist Dr. Robert Horwich and Bermudian Landing landowner Fallet Young. Their initiative aimed to address threats to the Yucatán black howler monkey from deforestation, hunting, and agricultural expansion. The sanctuary began with the voluntary participation of twelve landowners and has since grown to include over 200 participants across seven villages in the Belize River Valley.

CBS was founded as a grassroots conservation model, built on the premise that private landowners could maintain wildlife habitat while also pursuing their own land-use needs. Each participating landholder agreed to conserve forested areas on their property, creating a patchwork of connected habitats along the Belize River. CBS is now recognized as an IUCN Category IV protected area and has served as a model for community-based conservation initiatives in other parts of Central America and beyond.

== Community Baboon Sanctuary Women's Conservation Group ==
In 1998, the Community Baboon Sanctuary Women's Conservation Group (CBSWCG) was formed to support the sanctuary's management and further involve local communities, particularly women. The group plays a central role in conservation planning, environmental education, and economic development projects within the sanctuary. Directed by Jessy Young, CBSWCG represents seven villages: Big Falls/St. Paul's Bank, Willows Bank, Double Head Cabbage, Bermudian Landing, Isabella Bank, Scotland Halfmoon, and Flowers Bank.

In 2017, the CBSWCG received the United Nations Equator Prize in recognition of its success in combining conservation with poverty reduction and sustainable development. Over the decades, the sanctuary has expanded its scope to include reforestation, sustainable agriculture, and ecotourism initiatives. During this time, the black howler monkey population in the area has increased from approximately 800 individuals in 1985 to more than 3,500 by 2017.

== Geography and environment ==
The Community Baboon Sanctuary (CBS) is located along the lower Belize River in the Belize District, approximately 31 miles northwest of Belize City. The sanctuary spans more than 5,000 hectares of riparian and lowland tropical forest, encompassing private lands across seven villages in the Belize River Valley: Bermudian Landing, Big Falls/St. Paul's Bank, Willows Bank, Double Head Cabbage, Isabella Bank, Scotland Halfmoon, and Flowers Bank.

The region's landscape is characterized by riverine forests, secondary growth, and farmland mosaics, which together form a corridor suitable for arboreal wildlife like the Yucatán black howler monkey. Despite some loss of forest cover over time, habitat connectivity remains relatively high, allowing for continued dispersal of monkey populations between forest patches.

Local flora includes economically and culturally important tree species used for food, construction, and medicine. Many of these species also provide habitat and foraging opportunities for black howler monkeys. In addition to the howler monkey, CBS supports a variety of other wildlife, including Baird's tapir (Tapirus bairdii), jaguar (Panthera onca), puma (Puma concolor), Morelet's Crocodile(Crocodylus moreletii) and over 200 bird species.

== Goals ==
The Community Baboon Sanctuary (CBS) in Belize operates with five primary goals: conservation, education, research, tourism, and community development. These objectives intersect to promote environmental sustainability and enhance the well-being of local communities.

=== Yucatán black howler monkey conservation ===
The primary focus of the Community Baboon Sanctuary is the protection of the Yucatán black howler (Alouatta pigra), a species native to Belize, northern Guatemala, and southern Mexico. Locally referred to as the "baboon", the black howler monkey is considered vulnerable due to its limited geographic range and the continuing threats of habitat loss, fragmentation, and hunting.

Established in 1985, the Community Baboon Sanctuary has been widely recognized as an early example of community-based conservation, linking local stewardship with biodiversity protection. Residents voluntarily manage their private lands to maintain and connect forest corridors vital to the monkeys' survival, while also benefitting from tourism and environmental education efforts. This model has led to notable increases in local black howler populations, despite broader regional trends of deforestation and habitat degradation. In 1992-1994, in a special project, several family groups of monkeys from CBS were reintroduced into the Cockscomb Basin of Belize to repopulate the area.

A study of the Community Baboon Sanctuary between 1989 and 2004 found that while forest cover decreased by 33% due to surrounding agricultural expansion, habitat connectivity within the sanctuary remained relatively high, allowing for continued monkey dispersal and colonization between forest patches. This has helped maintain population viability, although researchers caution that long-term success requires ongoing habitat protection and restoration efforts.

Conservation strategies in CBS also emphasize the role of cultural and personal ties to the land. Community members identify and protect areas of personal significance, which often overlap with important monkey habitats. A 2020 study documented 52 locally valued plant species that provide ecological services to both humans and black howler monkeys, reinforcing the Sanctuary's integrated approach to conservation and community well-being.

However, conservation outside protected areas remains a challenge. Research conducted in Campeche, Mexico, found that black howler monkeys living in unprotected and disturbed habitats exhibited higher levels of stress, as measured by fecal glucocorticoid concentrations. These elevated stress levels are associated with food competition and exposure to human disturbances, raising concerns about the long-term viability of fragmented monkey populations without conservation interventions like those implemented at CBS.

=== Tourism ===
Ecotourism has played a central role in the development and sustainability of the Community Baboon Sanctuary since its founding, operating as a grassroots conservation initiative that links habitat protection with economic opportunities for local residents. The sanctuary offers visitors guided tours, wildlife viewing experiences, and cultural activities across the seven participating villages, with the black howler monkey as the primary attraction.

Revenue generated through tourism supports community infrastructure and conservation education, while also providing a financial incentive for landowners to conserve forested areas on their properties. The initiative has been recognized internationally as a model of community-based ecotourism, balancing biodiversity conservation with rural development. In 2017, the Community Baboon Sanctuary Women's Conservation Group received the United Nations Equator Prize for advancing both environmental and social outcomes.

The Community Baboon Sanctuary's approach aligns with broader trends in primate ecotourism, which aim to balance conservation goals with visitor engagement. As with other forms of nature-based tourism, however, ecotourism in CBS must navigate potential risks such as habitat disturbance, habituation of wildlife, and the spread of human diseases to primates. In contrast to some sites where tourism has led to negative outcomes, CBS has maintained a low-impact model through local governance, small-scale infrastructure, and community-led management.

=== Education ===
Education is a core component of the Community Baboon Sanctuary's mission, aimed at fostering conservation awareness and long-term community engagement. From its early years, CBS has integrated environmental education into its outreach efforts, targeting both local residents and international visitors.

Educational programs in the sanctuary are community-led and designed to promote understanding of local biodiversity, sustainable land use, and the cultural importance of forest conservation. These initiatives include classroom visits, public talks, interpretive signage, and on-site workshops. Annual youth summer camps offer students hands-on experiences in wildlife tracking, plant identification, and ecology, helping cultivate a sense of stewardship among younger generations.

In addition to informal education, CBS has supported academic opportunities for local residents through scholarships. As of 2017, over 40 students from the participating villages had received educational support, many of whom have gone on to contribute to conservation work in the region.

The sanctuary also serves as a site for international researchers and university field courses, contributing to both local knowledge and the global understanding of community-based conservation strategies. These exchanges provide valuable opportunities for cross-cultural learning and promote evidence-based conservation practices.

== See also ==
- Yucatán black howler
- Belize
- List of protected areas of Belize
- Conservation in Belize
