= Gardenia, Belize =

Gardenia
- Location within Belize
- Coordinates: 17°40′23″N 88°25′05″W
- Country: Belize
- District: Belize
- Constituency: Belize Rural North

Government
  - Type: Village Council
- Elevation: 14 m (46 ft)

Population
  - Total: 350
- Time zone: UTC-6 (Central)
- Climate: Am
- Website: www.gardeniavillage.com

Gardenia is a village in Belize District, Belize located about 20 miles (32 km) north of Belize City.

== Geography ==
Gardenia is located at 17°40′23″N 88°25′05″W (17.673, -88.418), between Sandhill and Biscayne villages.

Gardenia stretches from mile 20 to 23 on the Northern Highway and includes the Grace Bank Community for administrative purposes. The village of May Pen, one of the Belize River Valley Communities, is accessed by land via a detour from Gardenia. In terms of waterways, the Belize River passes through Grace Bank, while the Mexico Creek/Lagoon flows through huge culverts across the Northern Highway and empties into the river at Grace Bank. The village is 13.92 meters or 45.669 feet above sea level.

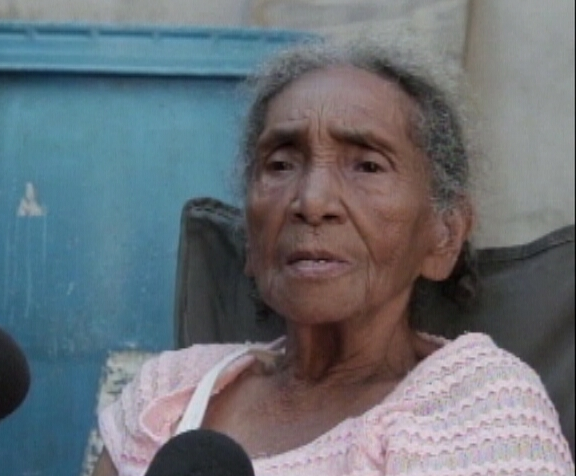
Mrs. Ann Olivera

== Demographics ==
At the time of the 2010 census, Gardenia had a population of 303. Of these, 86.8% were Creole, 5.3% Mixed, 4.3% Mestizo, 1.3% East Indian, 1.0% Garifuna, 0.7% Mopan Maya, 0.3% Caucasian and 0.3% Ketchi Maya.

== History of Gardenia ==
In 1985, a group of senior women decided to form a Women's group. After approaching the Ministry of Rural Development with their idea, Mrs. Ann Olivera and her Associates decided on the name “Gardenia” for the village.

With the current population of 350, residents primarily focus on farming. They commute to other urban centers for employment and education, taking elementary education in the nearby Sandhill and Biscayne villages.

== Crooked Tree Wildlife Sanctuary ==
Gardenia is part of the Crooked Tree Wildlife Sanctuary for birds and other endangered species.
