= Isabella Bank =

- Location within Belize
- Coordinates: 17°35′N 88°32′W
- Country: Belize
- District: Belize District
- Constituency: Belize Rural North
- Time zone: UTC-6 (Central)

Isabella Bank is a village in Belize District in Belize, Central America. It is located on the banks of the Belize River.

The central and outlying areas are located in pine ridge type terrain with very light, sandy soil. Closer to the river the soil becomes a heavier clay, which supports thicker vegetation.

This village has a population of 130. A number of residents have cleared acreage, where they raise livestock, including cattle and sheep. Traditionally a farming community using slash-and-burn farming methods, there has been largely a transition to a workforce that commutes to larger metropolitan areas (e.g. Belize City) as day laborers. This has been particularly evident in the younger portion of the populace.

As of 2016, the village was connected to the pipe water system operated by Belize Water Services. Residents also benefit from grid electric service provided by Belize Electricity Limited. Isabella Bank has a respected private primary school, Isabella Harmony Private School.

There is currently no store or shop in the village, but supplies are readily available at shops in nearby villages Bermudian Landing (approximately two miles away) and Scotland Halfmoon.

Public transportation includes a number of local bus lines serving surrounding villages and connecting with Belize City. It can be reached by traveling the Philip Goldson Highway out of Belize City to the junction of the road that branches into Burrell Boom (a large village). There is a paved road from Burrell Boom to Isabella Bank.

== Demographics ==
At the time of the 2010 census, Isabella Bank had a population of 143. Of these, 40.6% were Creole, 23.1% Mestizo, 19.6% Mixed, 9.1% Caucasian, 4.2% East Indian, 2.1% Mopan Maya, 0.7% African and 0.7% Ketchi Maya.
