= Gwendolyn Lizarraga =

Belizean businesswoman, women's rights activist and politician

Member of the Belize House of Representatives for Pickstock
- In office 26 March 1961 – 30 October 1974
- Preceded by: (constituency created)
- Succeeded by: Adolfo Lizarraga

Personal details
- Born: Gwendolyn Margaret Smith; 11 July 1901 Maskall, Belize District, British Honduras
- Died: 9 June 1975 (aged 73) Belize City, Belize
- Party: People's United Party

Gwendolyn Margaret Lizarraga, MBE (11 July 1901 – 9 June 1975) commonly known as Madam Liz, was a Belizean businesswoman, women's rights activist and politician. She was the first woman elected to the British Honduras Legislative Assembly (now the Belize House of Representatives) and the first woman to serve as a government minister in British Honduras, now Belize.

== Biography ==
Gwendolyn Margaret Smith was born on 11 July 1901 to Sidney Smith and Guadalupe Baeza in Maskall Village, British Honduras. She attended Mr. Datsun Primary School, St. Mary's Primary School and St. Catherine's Academy. In 1926, she married the photographer Victor Manuel Lizarraga and they subsequently had five children.

=== Business career ===
Lizarraga was a businesswoman, who operated a successful chicle and mahogany farm. As she conducted her business inspecting the chicle and mahogany camps, Lizarraga ignored convention, driving a land rover, wearing pants, carrying a gun, and smoking cigarettes. She was very outspoken and authoritative, and not intimidated in her dealings with big companies such as Wrigley's, Castillo and Thurton. She was also known as a compassionate employer and one who supported equal pay for equal work. In 1943, when the British Honduran Trade Union (BHTU) was forming, Lizarraga was an invited speaker to an April meeting. She urged inclusion of protections for women laborers and equal wages and while the male participants agreed with her at her speech, when they voted on their minimum wage standards in June of that year, women were excluded.

=== Activism ===
Beginning in the 1950s, Lizarraga worked in several areas to promote women's rights. In 1953, she was hired as a female parole officer for the Social Development Department. In 1954, she began organizing women politically throughout the country beginning in her home area of Maskall Village. From there she traveled north to Orange Walk Town, and then to Sand Hill, Benque Viejo and finally to the far southern, Punta Gorda. In 1959, she formed the United Women's Group (UWG) with 900 women from throughout the country, with the goals of empowering women culturally, economically, and politically. To that end, she co-founded the United Women's Credit Union, encouraging women save, "even if they could only afford $0.25 per week". Recognizing that only landowners were eligible voters in British Honduras at that time, Madam Liz made special efforts to help women acquire property. She took women from the UWG to the Lands Department to obtain land grants, but they were told there was no land available. Marching into the swamps, Lizarraga surveyed and created a map of parcels for the women. She then took it back to the Lands Department for recording. These women's parcels are located in what is today the Collet Constituency between Curassow, Elston Kerr and Gibnut Streets, bounded by North Creek. Similarly when children were denied access to education because there was no money to prepare the site and construct a school in their poor and working-class neighborhood, Madam Liz and the UWG women began clearing the mangroves from the swamps with two-man handsaws. Workers from the Publics Works Department later joined the women and the result was two new schools—Belize Junior Secondary Schools N° 1 and N° 2—were completed, which were later renamed Edward P. Yorke School and Gwen Lizarraga High School.

=== Political career ===
1961 marked the first year that women were allowed to run in the country's national elections. In April, Gwendolyn Lizarraga became the first woman elected to the National Assembly of British Honduras. She won the Pickstock division with 69% of the votes. Subsequently, she was appointed as Minister of Education, Housing and Social Services, making her the first female Minister in the country, as well. She was reelected in 1965 and 1969, both times also being reappointed as Minister of Education, Housing and Social Services. In 1969, she spearheaded a project to build low-cost housing in the neighborhoods of King's Park, Lake Independence and Queen's Square. Lizarraga staunchly opposed granting casino concessions in the country and spoke out about her concerns.

Lizarraga was not a candidate for reelection in 1974, leaving office shortly before her final illness. She was succeeded in the Pickstock seat by her son, Adolfo.

In addition to her public life, Lizarraga was a chess player and helped organize the first chess club in the country. She also collected folklore and was a choreographer, instrumental in the revival of the Mestizada dances.

She died 9 June 1975 and was buried in Lord's Ridge Cemetery in Belize City.

== Legacy ==
Lizarraga has been honored by several posthumous memorials. The Gwendolyn Lizarraga High School was named in her honor and offers both secondary education and tertiary classes in a program held in conjunction with the University of Belize. Several streets throughout the country are named for her, like Madam Liz Avenue and Gwen Lizarraga Street. In 1992, as part of a commemorative series, a postage stamp was issued with her photograph. The "Madam Liz" Award is granted annually by the Belize Women's Political Caucus to the woman whose work has been exemplary in improving the situation of Belizean women and children.
