= Crooked Tree, Belize =

Crooked Tree
- Location in Belize
- Coordinates: 17°46′34″N 88°32′31″W
- Country: Belize
- District: Belize District
- Constituency: Belize Rural North
- Climate: Am

Crooked Tree, sometimes known as Crooked Tree Village, is a settlement located in the nation of Belize. It is a mainland village located in the Belize District.

== Demographics ==
At the time of the 2010 Census, Crooked Tree had a population of 805. Of these, 85.2% were Creole, 10.3% Mixed, 2.4% Mestizo, 0.9% Caucasian, 0.7% African, 0.2% Garifuna and 0.2% East Indian.

== History ==
The Chau Hiix Archaeological Site in Crooked Tree indicates that Mayas lived in the area several thousand years ago. The site, located at the southwest corner of Western Lagoon, has a pyramid that is almost 75 feet tall, and expeditions into tombs have revealed beads, containers, blades, and ornamental objects. The site was revealed to the outside world in 1990 and potentially is connected to the nearby Lamanai Ruins.

Some claim that the name came from a twisted bullet wood tree hidden in an inaccessible area of the village, while others claim it was named for three "crooks" who settled in the area in the 1700s – three slaveowners, the Tilletts, the Gilletts, and the Crawfords, known as the "crooked three".

Crooked Tree was established around 1750, one of the earliest inland European settlements in Belize. European settlers and Africans they had enslaved travelled up the Belize River looking for logwood to use in dye production.

== Environment and nature ==
Crooked Tree is home to the Crooked Tree Wild Life Sanctuary, a waterbird sanctuary recognized by the Belize Audubon Society as a Wetland of International Importance. It contains both wetland and terrestrial habitats, and includes lagoons, creeks, logwood swamps, broadleaf forests, and flatwoods. Endangered species that live within the sanctuary include the Central African River Turtle, the Mexican Black Howler monkey, and the Yellow-headed parrot.

Crooked Tree is well known for its local cashew production and its Crooked Tree Cashew Festival, which is celebrated annually in early May.
