= Grace Bank =

Hamlet in Belize

Grace Bank Barcadares
- Hamlet
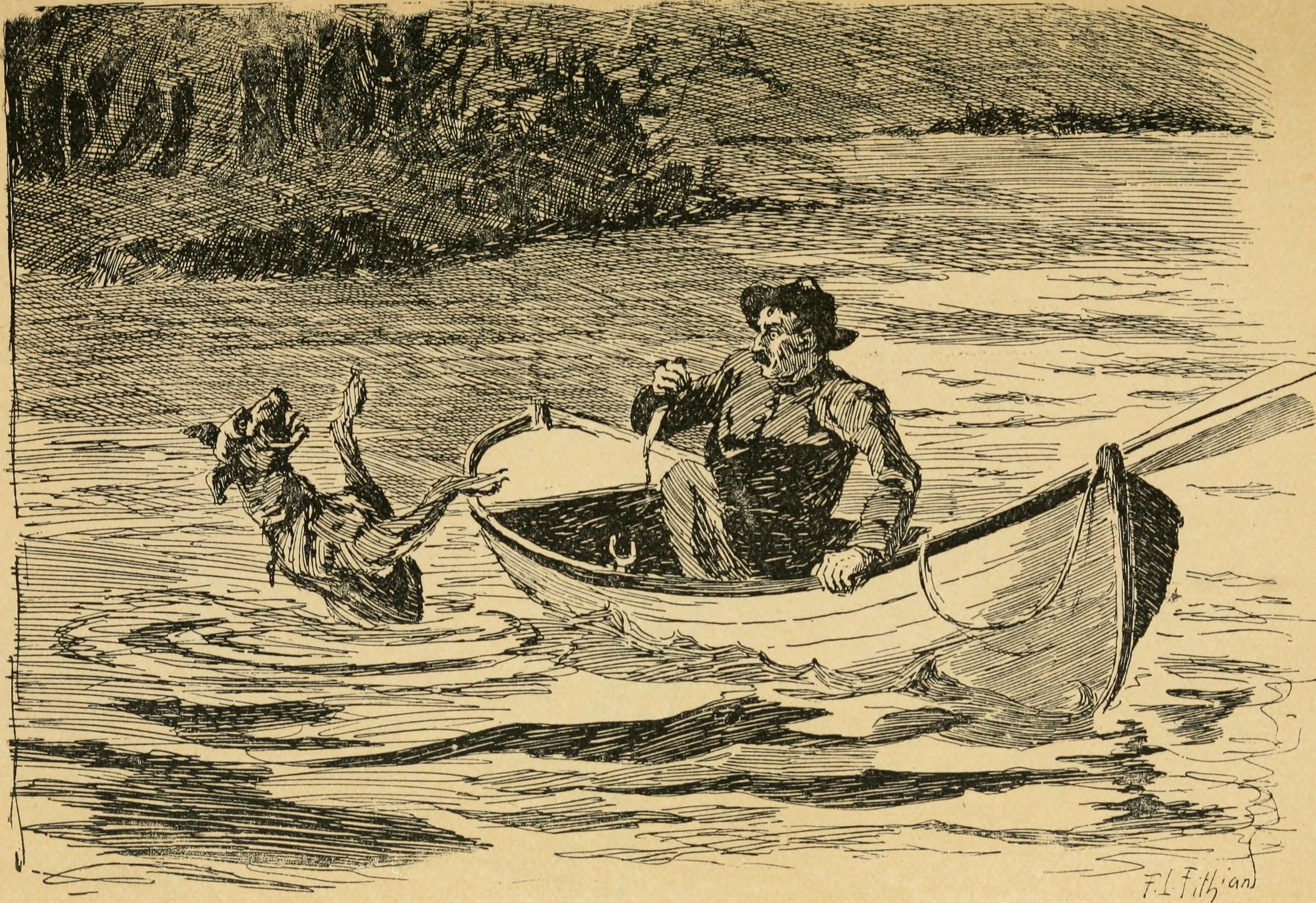
- Illustration from 1889 Sparks from the camp fire by C. S. Greene.
- Etymology: embarcadero
- Location within Belize Location within the Caribbean
- Coordinates: 17.65107°N 88.39969°W
- Country: Belize
- District: Belize
- Settled: 1650s (as capital)
- Relocated: 1760 (to St. George's Caye)
- Resettled: 1763 (as hamlet)
- Renamed: 19th cent. (Grace Bank)
- Named for: an embarcadero (former) resident named Grace (current)

Government
  - Type: Town meeting (to 1760); Unincorporated hamlet (1763–present)
  - Body: Public meeting (to 1760); None (1763–present)

Area
  - Total: 1 sq mi (2.6 km^{2})
  - Land: 0.4 sq mi (1.0 km^{2})
  - Water: 0.6 sq mi (1.6 km^{2})
- Elevation: 15 ft (4.6 m)

Population (2010)
  - Total: 49
  - Density: 120/sq mi (47/km^{2})
- Demonym: Baymen (formerly)
- Time zone: UTC−6 (GMT−6)

Grace Bank, formerly Barcadares, is an unincorporated hamlet 33 miles up the Belize River. It was the second settlement founded by the first English settlers of present-day Belize. It was settled in the 1650s, relocated in 1760, and resettled in 1853.

== History ==
=== Prior to English settlement ===
==== Pre-Columbian ====
Grace Bank's immediate surroundings were likely first settled by nomadic Paleo-Indians prior to the 8th millennium BC, during the Lithic period in Mesoamerica. (Note: Paleo-indian projectile points have been recovered from Lowe Ranch, Sandhill, and Burrell Boom, all within seven miles of Grace Bank (Stemp, Awe & Helmke 2016, p. 72, Stemp et al. 2016, p. 282, Kelly 1993, p. 206, Google 2022).) Mayan farmers founded permanent settlements in the area by the 2nd millennium BC, during the Archaic period in Mesoamerica. By the 16th century, the region formed part of Dzuluinicob, a Postclassic Mayan state.

==== Columbian ====
===== Rise of Spanish dominion, 1528–1544 =====
Sixteenth century residents of the area first became aware of Spaniards in 1502, with the 30 July landing of Christopher Columbus in Guanaja. (Note: During 30 July–14 August of 1502, Columbus surveyed the coast of present-day Honduras from Guanaja to Trujillo. Alternatively, residents may have become aware of Spaniards after: 1. the 1508 (start of July–end of December) arrival of Juan Díaz de Solís and Vicente Yáñez Pinzón to Lake Izabal (Varela Marcos 2018a, para. 8–16, Varela Marcos 2018b, para. 33–41, Arranz Márquez 2018, para. 12–20), 2. the 1511 (s.d. – s.d.) arrival of Gonzalo Guerrero and his marooned shipmates to Cozumel (González Hernández 2018, para. 4–5).) On 8 December 1526, Francisco de Montejo was named adelantado of the Yucatán Peninsula (including the territory of Dzuluinicob). The Spanish conquest reached the area in the third quarter of 1528, during Montejo's southern entrada. Said conquest lasted until the first or second quarter of 1544, upon Melchor and Alonso Pacheco's defeat of Chetumal and Dzuluinicob, and their subsequent founding of Bacalar. Some or most of the area's surviving residents were (forcibly) relocated to reducción towns closer to Bacalar, and (forcibly) converted to Roman Catholicism. (Note: These reducción towns were held in encomiendas by Melchor Pacheco, Martín Rodríguez, Alonso Pacheco, Pedro de Avila, Alonso Hernández, Juan Farfán, and possibly Juan Pérez de Castañeda (Jones 1989, pp. 44, 59). A visita church was built in Tipu in 1543–1550 (Graham 2011, p. 224). A second was built in Lamanai in c. 1544, 1544–1550, or in c. 1568 (Graham 2011, pp. 231–232, 236–238, Rushton 2014, p. 48, Mayfield 2015, p. 20, Pendergast 1993, pp. 120–122), and a third (in Lamanai) in the 1560s or in c. 1568 (Graham 2011, pp. 231–232, 236–238, Rushton 2014, p. 48, Mayfield 2015, p. 20). A Spanish plaza was erected in Tipu in 1568 (Graham 2011, p. 228).)

A secular parish was (belatedly) established at Bacalar in 1565 by Pedro de la Costa. In the latter three quarters of 1568, an entrada and reducción by Juan de Garzón and the vecinos of Bacalar resulted in the further disintegration of Postclassic Mayan society in the area, thereby cementing Spanish dominion from Bacalar. (Note: Franciscan frays Francisco de Benavides, Martín de Barrientos and Alonso Toral possibly accompanied the Garzón entrada (Graham 2011, p. 160, Jones 1989, p. 85).)

===== Fall of Spanish dominion, 1638–1642 =====
Bacalar began to lose control over its district in c. 1615, as alcaldes ordinarios were forced to re-establish reducción towns near Tipu in 1615, to conduct a visita in 1620. (Note: Juan Sánchez de Aguilar led the 1615 reducciones (Jones 1989, pp. 132, 192–193), Juan Alonso Díaz de Aguilar the 1620 visita (Jones 1989, p. 193).) In 1638, Tipu led the area into general revolt against Bacalar, resulting in the collapse of Spanish power over the region by 1642, and the relocation of a majority of the area's residents to Tipu. (Note: Tipu's efforts were likely aided by the Peten Itza kingdom, and by repeated piratical raids of the Bacalar district (Jones 1989, p. 191, Sharer & Traxler 2006, p. 774). Spanish dominion over the (nominal) district of Bacalar was not re-established until the second or third quarter of 1695, during a visita by Francisco de Hariza y Arruyo (Sharer & Traxler 2006, p. 774, Jones 1989, pp. 259–267, Molina Solís 1910, p. 350, Graham 2011, pp. 251–252).)

=== English settlement ===
==== Anglo-Dutch piracy, 1617–1650s ====
Pirates are first thought to have arrived near Grace Bank in 1617, during a raid of Bacalar by English pirates or privateers. (Note: The raiders further abducted Pedro Rojo, Antonio Gómez, and three other vecinos of Bacalar (Jones 1989, p. 320). Bacalar was thrice more raided on 22 November 1642 (Molina Solís 1910, p. 138, Jones 1989, pp. 226–227, Vazquez Barke 2012, p. 112, footnote no. 382), in June 1648 (López de Cogolludo 1688, pp. 714–717, Molina Solís 1910, pp. 176, 211–212), and on 29 May 1652 (López de Cogolludo 1688, pp. 749–752, Vazquez Barke 2012, p. 114, footnote no. 390, Reichert 2017, p. 27, Conover Blancas 2013, pp. 50–51), resulting in its relocation first to Pacha, then to Chunhuhub (Gerhard 1979, p. 70), until 1729, when it was resettled as a military outpost (Gerhard 1979, pp. 15, 71, Vazquez Barke 2016, p. 188, Reichert 2017, p. 29).) In the 1630s, pirates were further attracted to the region by the increasing willingness of Spanish residents to trade with non-Spaniards, and the possibility of abducting Mayan residents for impressment or sale at non-Spanish slave markets. (Note: Pirates' enslavement of Amerindians is thought to have lasted until c. 1665 (Bialuschewski 2020, p. 239).) Belize City is thought to have been settled in 1638, by a crew of shipwrecked buccaneers. (Note: These buccaneers are further thought to have been led by Peter Wallace (Craig 1969, p. 55, Curry 1956, p. 32, Donohoe 1964, pp. 27–28, Gibbs 1883, pp. 21–22, Griffith, Alford & Bolland 2022, third para, Kinsbruner & Langer 2008, first para, Waight 2022, second to fourth para). The details of this story are debated (see eg Carillo y Ancona 1878, pp. 260–261, Asturias 1925, pp. 8–9, Finamore 1994, pp. 21–24, Ancona 1877, pp. 5–8, Ancona 1878, pp. 373–374, Bulmer-Thomas & Bulmer-Thomas 2016, Humphreys 1961, p. 1).)

==== English logging, 1650s–1763 ====
In the 1540s, Marcos de Ayala Trujeque, a vecino of Merida, is thought to have pioneered the use of logwood dyes in the Old World. The early buccaneer settlers (now Baymen) turned to logging logwood in the 1650s, when they are thought to have settled Grace Bank (then Barcadares). (Note: The use of logwood dyes in England was prohibited sometime during 21 March 1580 – 20 March 1581, per 23 Eliz. 1 ch. 9 (Raithby 1819a, p. 671). The prohibition was strengthened in 1597, per 39 Eliz. 1 ch. 11 (Raithby 1819a, pp. 911–912). It was loosened on 29 February 1620 (Green 1858, vol. 112), and finally lifted sometime during 7 January 1662 – 3 May 1662, per 14 Chas. 2 ch. 11 (Raithby 1819b, pp. 393–400, Green 1861, vol. 54 no. 12).)

==== Anglo-Spanish hostilities, 1650s–1763 ====
Barcadares's settlers opened conflict against Bacalar on 29 May 1652, when they are thought to have led or been involved in that villa's sacking. (Note: In addition to –: 1. the November 1652 raids of Mayan reducción settlements on the New River (Jones 1989, p. 231, footnotes nos. 38-40, Reichert 2017, p. 27, Conover Blancas 2013, pp. 50–51), 2. the 23 October 1654 interruption of an entrada by Francisco Pérez of Bacalar (Jones 1989, p. 231, footnotes nos. 38-40), 3. the 1660s sacking of Bacalar-in-Pacha (Gerhard 1979, p. 70, Jones 1989, p. 334, item no. 10), 4. (possibly) the August 1677 interruption (by Bartholomew Sharpe) of a misión by Franciscan fray Joseph Delgado (Bialuschewski 2017, pp. 52–53, García Paláez 1852, pp. 127–129).) Spanish Yucatan retaliated during 16 November 1694 – 28 February 1695 with a paramilitary campaign against the Baymen's camps and settlements, thereby presaging over a century of Anglo-Spanish conflict that would eventually lead to the relocation of Barcadares. This campaign led to the first (of many) evacuations of the Baymen's settlements. (Note: With similar evacuations occurring in –: 1. start of January 1700 – end of June 1703, occasioned by three paramilitary campaigns by Spanish Yucatan (anon. 1701, Calderón Quijano 1944, p. 69, footnote no. 1, Molina Solís 1910, pp. 9–10, Jones 1989, p. 334, item no. 8, Vazquez Barke 2016, pp. 145, 171), 2. start of May 1729 – 20 October 1735, occasioned by an infantry campaign by Spanish Yucatan (anon. 1732b, anon. 1732d, anon. 1732a, anon. 1732e, Vazquez Barke 2012, p. 124), 3. 3 June 1747 – prior to end of January 1748, occasioned by a Spanish campaign (Burdon 1931, p. 74), 4. 9 January 1752 – prior to mid-February 1752, occasioned by Spanish privateers or guardacostas (anon. 1752a, anon. 1752b, Burdon 1931, p. 78), 5. start of May 1753 – end of May 1753, occasioned by Spanish privateers or guardacostas (anon. 1753), 6. 18 June 1754 – 12 April 1755, occasioned (first) by a Spanish infantry campaign and (later) by a Spanish naval campaign (anon. 1754a, anon. 1754b, anon. 1754c, anon. 1754d, anon. 1754e, anon. 1755a, anon. 1755b, anon. 1755c, Burdon 1931, pp. 80–84, Vazquez Barke 2016, pp. 151, 178, 187), 7. c. 10 November 1758 – prior to 20 July 1759, occasioned by Spanish privateers or guardacostas (anon. 1759a, anon. 1759b, anon. 1759c), 8. start of May 1760 – end of April 1763, occasioned by a naval campaign by Spanish Yucatan (Calderón Quijano 1944, pp. 193, 200, anon. 1760c).) Spanish Yucatan also tightened its control of the waters off the Belize River beginning on 2 November 1705 with the arrival of privateers or guardacostas Archibaldo Magdonel de Narión and Francisco Joseph Jiménez with 30 men aboard two goletas.

The final campaign against Barcadares occurred on 25 December 1759, when 150 Spaniards aboard a 'great number' of periaguas landed in the port of Belize. This coup de grâce resulted in the imprisonment of a number of Baymen, the seizure of several loaded flats, the burning of Barcadares and nearby logging camps, and a nearly three-year evacuation of all settlements (in favour of the safer Mosquito Shore). (Note: Though in 1759, Baymen and the merchant shipping had been repeatedly harassed by Spanish privateers or guardacostas (anon. 1760a, anon. 1759d, anon. 1759e, anon. 1760b).)

== Geography ==
=== Political ===
Grace Bank is not known to have been settled by Mayans. (Note: The closest (known) Mayan settlements are New Boston (four miles due east) and Boom (six miles due south) (Hausman 2013, Google 2022). The closest Classic Mayan city-states are Altun Ha (eight miles northeast), Lamanai (18 miles northwest), and Camalote (39 miles southwest) (Hausman 2013, Google 2022).) The area is thought to have formed part of Dzuluinicob from the 10th or 12th century to c. 1544. (Note: Based in Tipu, 60 miles southwest (Hausman 2013, Google 2022).) It was a de jure part of the municipio or district of Bacalar, in Yucatan, a province of New Spain, until 15 September 1821. (Note: Based in Bacalar, 71 miles due north (Google 2022).) It was a de facto part of the English settlement in the Bay of Honduras from the 1650s to 11 February 1862, and thereafter a de jure and de facto part of British Honduras. It is presently part of the Belize District of Belize.

=== Physical ===
Grace Bank lies on the northern bank of the Belize River, near its confluence with Francisco Creek, some eight or nine miles inland (as the crow flies) from the Caribbean Sea. It is 33 miles up the river, past Davis Bank, just before Lime Walk. It lies just south of Jones Lagoon, and west of Potts Creek Lagoon.

=== Climate ===
Grace Bank has a tropical monsoon climate (Köppen climate classification Am), with a May – November wet and a December – April dry season.

== Government ==
Grace Bank is currently part of the Belize Rural South constituency, and is represented in Parliament by Marconi Leal MP.
