= Boston, Belize =

Boston
- Location within Belize
- Coordinates: 17°40′20″N 88°21′48″W
- Country: Belize
- District: Belize District
- Constituency: Belize Rural North

Population
  - Total: 120
- Time zone: UTC-6 (Central)

Boston is a village at the Old Northern Highway in the Belize District, Belize. As an old plate indicates, the village was founded in 1956 and had a population of 120 people.

A school in Boston, Tree House Academy, that was opened six years before by James Duncan, was shut down on 15 October 2015 by the Ministry of Education because it was without a license and because of other irregularities.

== Demographics ==
At the time of the 2010 census, Boston had a population of 127. Of these, 53.5% were Mestizo, 26.8% Creole, 10.2% Mixed, 3.9% Mennonite, 2.4% Caucasian, 1.6% Ketchi Maya and 0.8% others.
