= List of districts of Belize by Human Development Index =

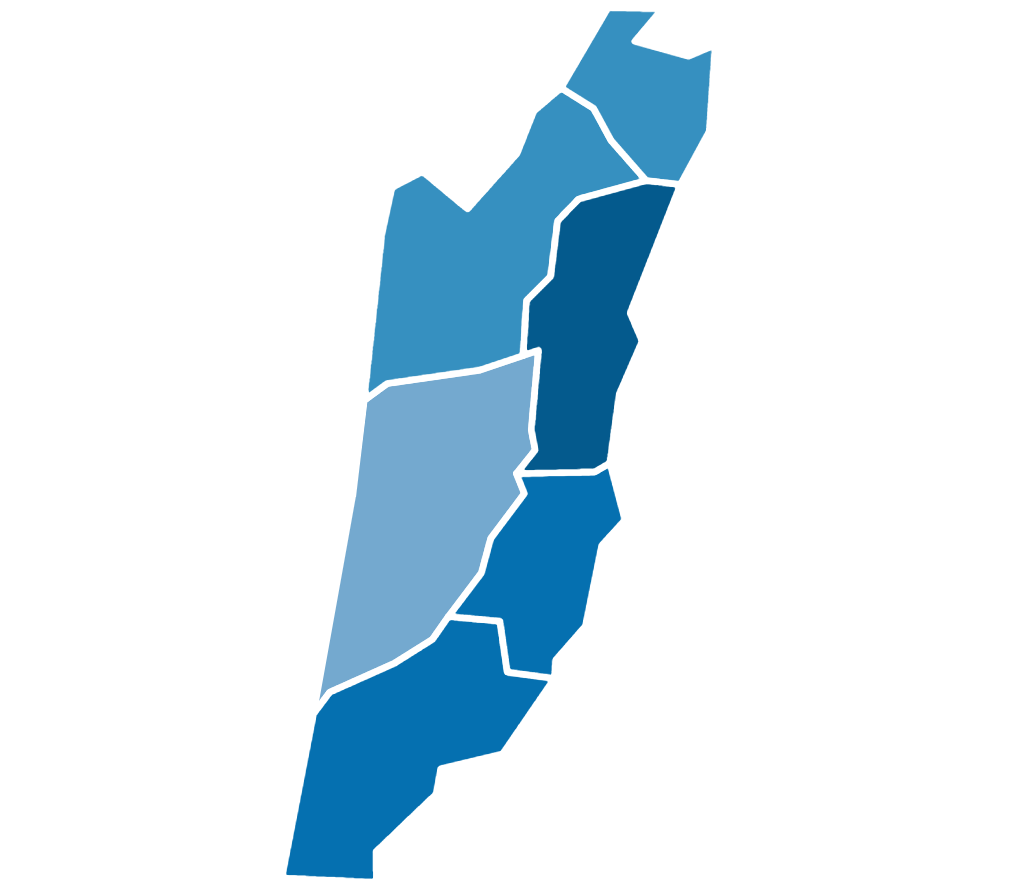
Districts of Belize by HDI in 2022 0.753 0.730 0.691 0.643

This is a list of the 6 districts of Belize by Human Development Index as of 2022.

Rank	District	HDI (2022)
High human development
1	Belize	0.730
2	Stann Creek and Toledo	0.711
–	Belize	0.700
Medium human development
3	Corozal and Orange Walk	0.672
4	Cayo (with Belmopan)	0.626

== See also ==
- List of countries by Human Development Index
