= Buttercup, Belize =

Human settlement in Belize

Coordinates: 17.5829884°N 88.4260128°W

Buttercup is a gated community located just outside the village of Burrell Boom, Belize District, Belize
