= Western Paradise, Belize =

Western Paradise
- Location within Belize
- Coordinates: 17.470553°N 88.295580°W
- Country: Belize
- District: Belize District
- Constituency: Belize Rural Central
- Elevation: 6 m (20 ft)

Population (2010)
  - Total: 1,258
- Time zone: UTC-6 (Central)

Western Paradise is a settlement in the Belize District of Belize in Central America. According to the 2010 census, Western Paradise had a population of 1,258 people in 348 households.

== History ==
In 2010 Western Pines, Sunset Park and Mile 8 Community were incorporated under one name, Western Paradise.

== Location and geographic setting ==
Western Paradise is located on mile 8 of the George Price Highway. In 2020 the John Smith Road was constructed heading north through the village.
