= Lord's Bank =

- Location within Belize
- Coordinates: 17.5495°N 88.3152°W
- Country: Belize
- District: Belize District
- Constituency: Belize Rural Central

Population (2010)
  - Total: 3,140
- Time zone: UTC-6 (Central)
- Climate: Am

Lord's Bank is a village in Belize District in the nation of Belize, Central America.
