= Flowers Bank =

Coordinates: 17°36′N 88°29′W

Flowers Bank is a village in Belize in Belize District. It is a famous place in Belizean history due to its defence of the then British Honduras by not fleeing in the face of Spanish invasion from Yucatán.

== Demographics ==
At the time of the 2010 census, Flowers Bank had a population of 121. Of these, 91.7% were Creole, 4.1% Mixed, 1.7% Mestizo, 0.8% East Indian and 0.8% Ketchi Maya.

== History ==
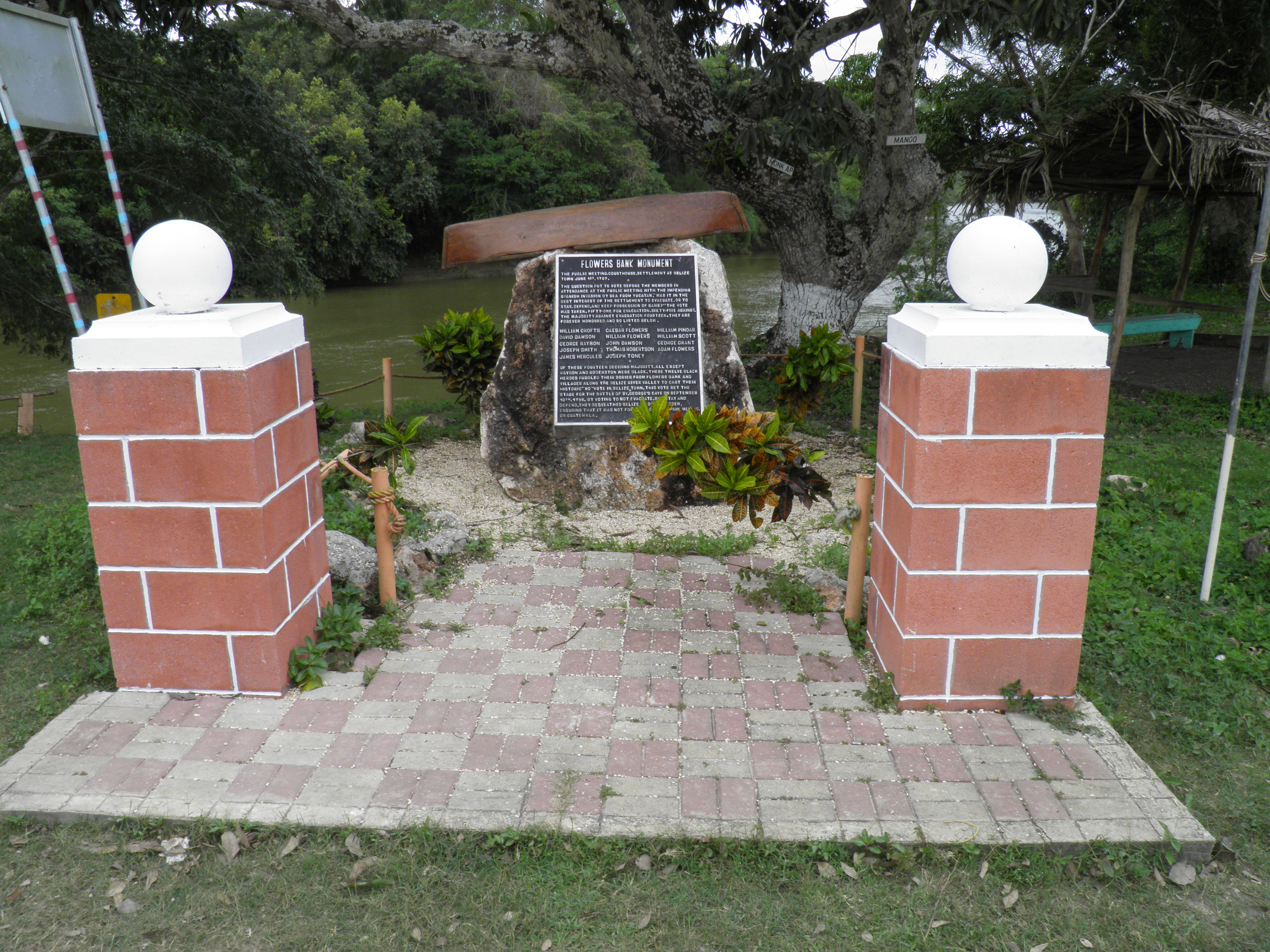
Flowers Bank monument

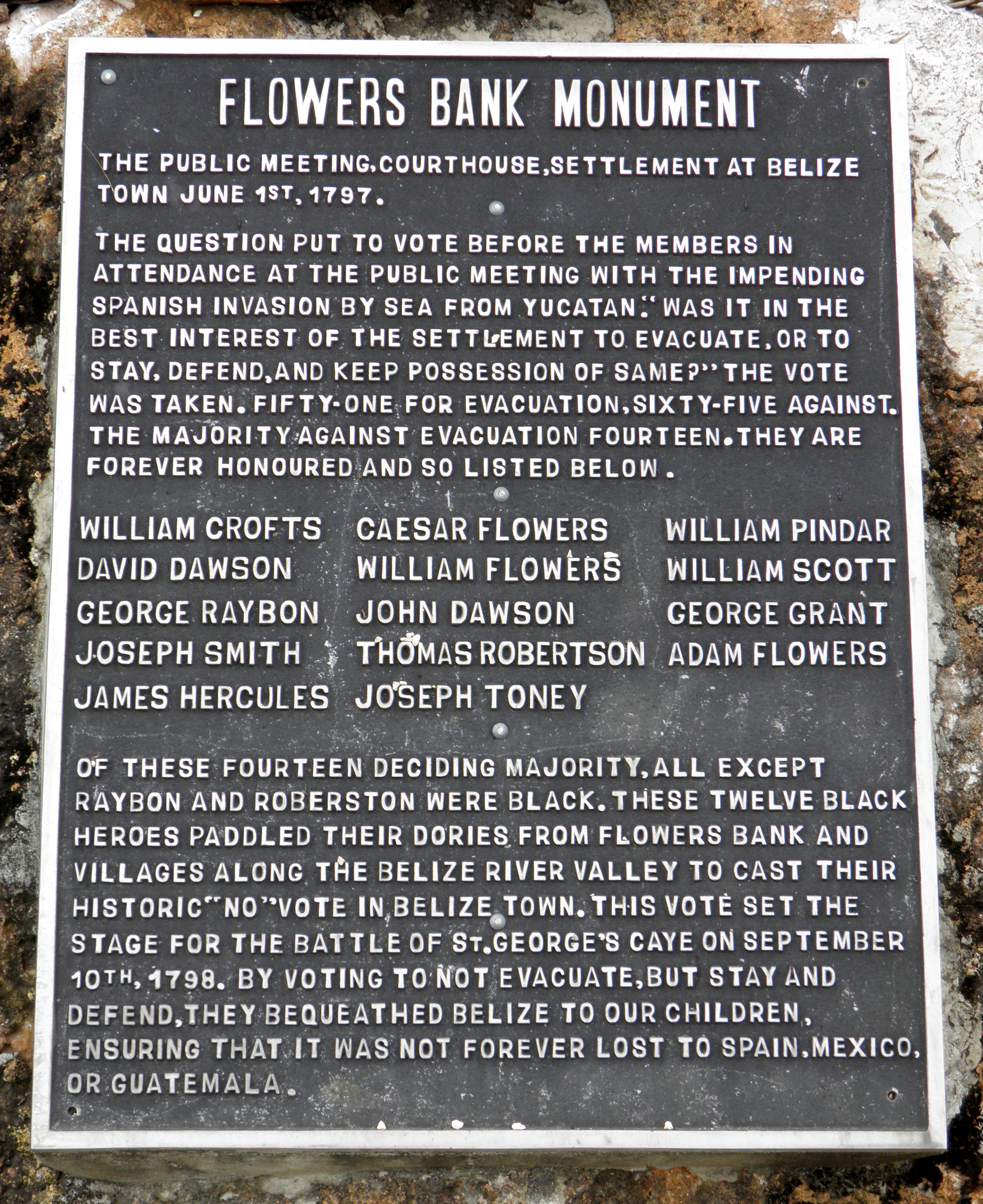
Flowers Bank sign

Before "The Battle of St. George's Caye" Flowers Bank was the settlement for slaves brought in the 1750s. Adam Flowers the ancestor of the Flowers family from Flowers Bank which lived up the "Belize River". He came from a set of slaves that people knew as "Flowaz Neegro Dehn". An English man by the name of William Flowers that was known from Britain was their owner. In the 1750s he brought his slaves to a place that was called mosquito shore

In 1786 William Flowers died. A lawyer from England took it upon himself and decided to say the slaves were not really free and he wanted to sell them. The slaves were not going to tolerate that at all. They began breaking into peoples' houses and stole guns, food, clothes and would run away into the bushes.

Now there was another man by the name of James Pit Larry. He was the superintendent at the time. He and the council decided to band the slaves because they were free for the last 30 years. After that they were set free once again, they came back to Belize with James Larry. At the time Belize was called "The Settlement"

It so happened that word was going around that the Spaniards threatened to attack Belize. The magistrate called a meeting at the same location where City Hall is now. They wanted the people that had settled in Belize to move and leave the place. This meeting was on 17 October 1796. All kinds of back and forth and quarreling happened at the meeting. Well, Mr. Adam Flowers from Flowers Bank got up and stated that he would go nowhere. He and his family were making a nice living where they lived on the river and they were free. He uttered "if we have to fight then fight we will to defend our land!"

They had more meetings after that. On 1 June 1797, they decided to vote as to whether they would stay and fight for their land or run away abandoning it. Well, the vote was a stalemate. So they sent word to Mr. Flowers to inform him the vote was a tie and to have him round up men to come vote. Himself and eleven more men paddled down from Flowers Bank to come and vote. When they reached there, they and two white men voted in favor of staying and defending the place.

When James Larry heard that the vote to abandon the settlement had been turned over, he said that he should have killed the slaves instead of pardoning them. It wasn't until the following year, on 10 September 1798 when the actual battle with the Spaniards took place.
