= May Pen, Belize =

Coordinates: 17°39′N 88°28′W

May Pen is a populated settlement located in the nation of Belize. It is a mainland village located in Belize District.
