= Santana, Belize =

Coordinates: 17°48′N 88°17′W

Santana is a settlement located in the nation of Belize. It is a mainland village located in Belize District. Santana is located 34 miles from Belize City. Its population is approximately 110.
