= Adolfo Lizarraga =

Belizean politician

Member of the Belize House of Representatives for Pickstock
- In office 30 October 1974 – 21 November 1979
- Preceded by: Gwendolyn Lizarraga
- Succeeded by: Jane Ellen Usher

Personal details
- Born: 26 December 1935 British Honduras (now Belize)
- Died: 23 November 2012 (aged 76) New Orleans, Louisiana, United States
- Party: People's United Party

Francisco Adolfo Lizarraga (26 December 1935 – 23 November 2012) was a Belizean politician who served a single term in the Belize House of Representatives in the 1970s. Lizarraga was a member of the People's United Party.

== Career ==
A member of the Belize City Council, Lizarraga was elected to the Belize House from the Belize City-based Pickstock constituency in 1974, succeeding his mother, Gwendolyn Lizarraga. During his term Lizarraga served as deputy speaker. He was not a candidate for reelection in 1979. In addition to his government service Lizarraga also served as editor of the Belize Times.

Upon leaving office Lizarraga moved to the United States where he worked for the American Overseas Trading Company in New Orleans.
