= Rancho Dolores =

Village in Belize

Coordinates: 17.53°N 88.62°W

Rancho Dolores is a village in Belize District, Belize, about 45 miles from Belize City. Part of the interest of Rancho Dolores is the way Creole life has been preserved, in contrast to the other villages, where is it largely moribund. Cooking is still done on the traditional firehearth, using the kiskis, a type of tongs made from the cohune palm. Every May, there are dances for Holy Week, including the hogshead dance and the plantation dance.

== History ==
The area was first settled around 1835 by Maria de Dolores and Pancho Pott. They built a sugar cane ranch called Rancho de Dolores, and later a rum distillery.

== Geography ==
The settlement is close to the Spanish Creek Wildlife Sanctuary, an important fauna and flora reserve. Its precise geographic location is 17.53 latitude and -88.62 longitude. It is the last village on the road leading down the Belize River Valley.

=== Flora ===
The wildlife sanctuary is home to Christiana africana, a tree which is considered rare in Belize.

=== Fauna ===
The nearby river has highly visible crocodiles, turtles and there are still jaguars in the nearby forest.

== Demographics ==
As of 2010 the settlement had a population of 217, of which 109 were male and 108 were female, divided among 48 households. This represented an increase from a population of 171 in 2000.

The people were originally Maya, but today are mostly Creole peoples.
