= Saint Paul's Bank =

Human settlement in Belize

Coordinates: 17.51469°N 88.58709°W

Saint Paul's Bank is a populated settlement located in the nation of Belize. It is a mainland village that is located in Belize District and one of seven villages across 18 - square miles of the Belize River Valley that make up the Community Baboon Sanctuary: Big Falls, St. Paul's Bank, Willow's Bank, Double Head Cabbage, Bermudian Landing, Isabella Bank and Flower's Bank. This village lies along a road which ends at the Belize River, and is well known for the “big falls” on the river. In the dry season these “falls” are large rock outcroppings, creating the largest rapids on the Belize River. These rapids are part of the route of La Ruta Maya, a 4-day canoe race on the Belize River.

The village had a population of 153 in 2010. This represents roughly 0.2% of the district's total population. This was a 49.20% decrease from 301 people recorded in 2000.

The “Creole Cultural Heritage Center” is located in St. Paul's, where villagers strive to protect the Creole culture.
