= Biscayne, Belize =

Village in Belize District, Belize

Biscayne is a village in Belize District of the central-east coastal region of Belize. Though the area was originally inhabited by Mayans this village was established in the region of Belize that was first settled by Europeans. It is one of 192 municipalities administered at the village level in the country for census taking purposes. The village had a population of 517 in 2010. This represents roughly 0.6% of the district's total population. This was a 33.90% increase from 386 people recorded in 2000. In terms of ethnicity, 85.5% were Creole, 6.8% Mestizo, 5.0% Mixed, 1.2% Garifuna, 0.8% East Indian, 0.2% African, 0.2% Caucasian, 0.2% Ketchi Maya and 0.2% others.
