= Willows Bank =

Village in Belize

Coordinates: 17°31′N 88°34′W

Willows Bank is a rural village in Belize District, Belize. It is located in the upper Belize River Valley.

== Climate ==
The mean annual rainfall at Willows Bank is 2,032 millimetres (80.0 in) per year.

== Recent developments ==
In 2013, the Willows Bank Village Council organized the 3rd annual Fyah Haat Festival to celebrate traditional Belizean fire hearth cooking.

In 2015, a communal livestock holding facility was opened at Willows Bank, on 50 acres of higher elevation, dry land, for use by local residents during floods or droughts.
