= Double Head Cabbage =

Belizean village

Coordinates: 17°32′N 88°33′W

Double Head Cabbage is a village in Belize located in Belize District.

== Demographics ==
At the time of the 2010 census, Double Head Cabbage had a population of 406. Of these, 93.1% were Creole, 5.4% Mixed, 0.7% East Indian, 0.2% Garifuna and 0.2% Mennonite.
