= Lucky Strike, Belize =

Village in Belize

Coordinates: 17°46′N 88°19′W

Lucky Strike is a rural village in Belize District, located along the Old Northern Highway in Belize. From Lucky Strike, a paved road leads to the Maya ruins of Altun Ha, approximately 2.4 miles (3.9 km) west of the village.

The village has a private high school called King's College. There is a local primary school called Lucky Strike Government School.
