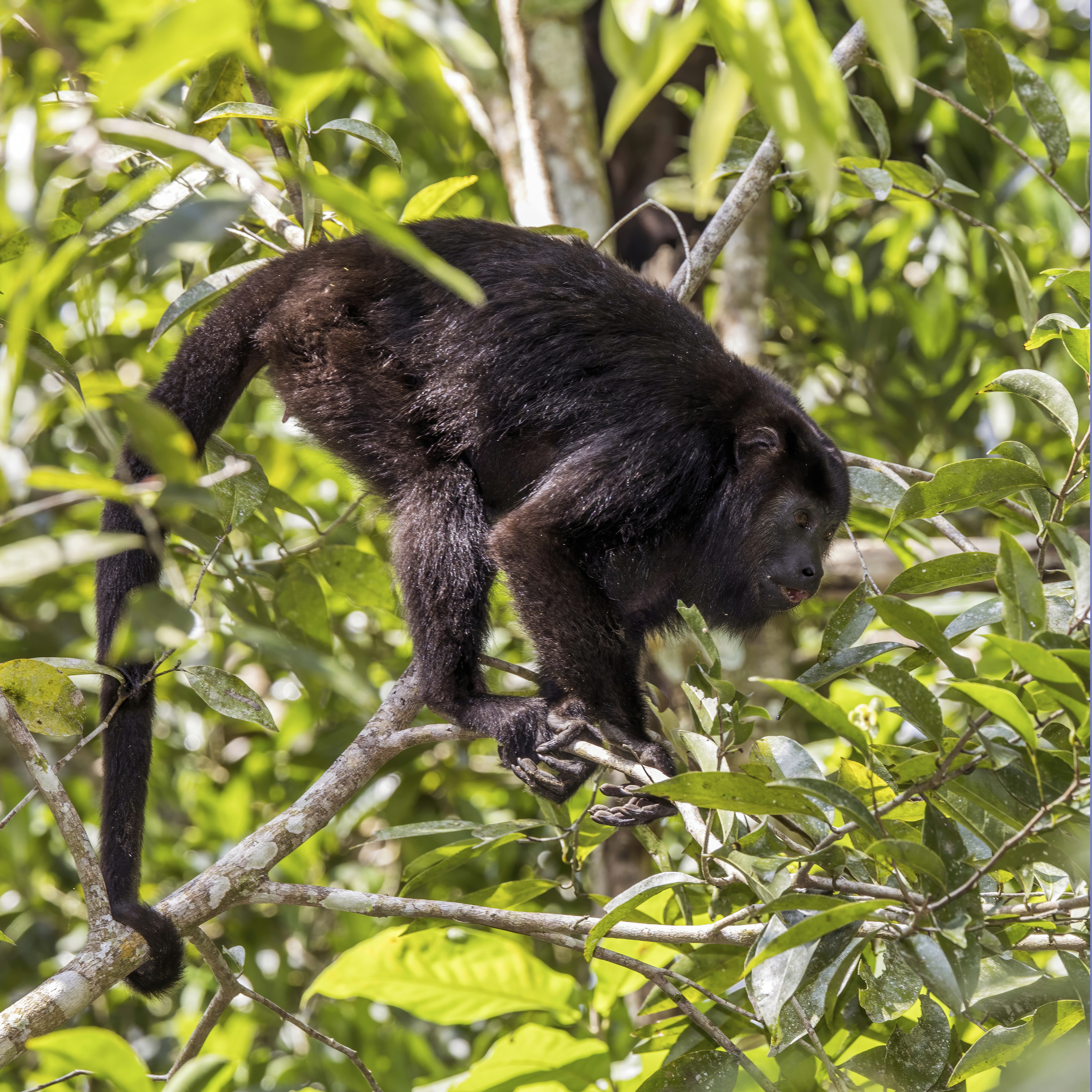
- Cayo district, Belize

Conservation status
- Endangered (IUCN 3.1)
- CITES Appendix I

Scientific classification
- Kingdom: Animalia
- Phylum: Chordata
- Class: Mammalia
- Order: Primates
- Family: Atelidae
- Genus: Alouatta
- Species: A. pigra

Binomial name
- Alouatta pigra Lawrence, 1933
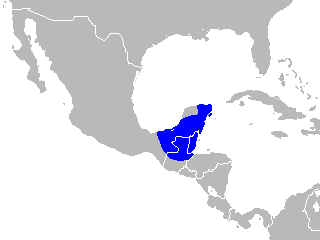
- Distribution of Alouatta pigra

Synonyms
- luctuosa (Lawrence, 1933); villosa (Gray, 1845)

= Yucatán black howler =

Species of New World monkey

The Yucatán black howler, or Guatemalan black howler, (Alouatta pigra) is a species of howler monkey, a type of New World monkey, from Central America. It is found in Belize, Guatemala and Mexico, in and near the Yucatán Peninsula. It lives in evergreen, semideciduous and lowland rain forests. It is also known as the baboon in Belize, although it is not closely related to the baboons in Africa.

== Description ==
The Yucatán black howler is the largest of the howler monkey species and one of the largest of the New World monkeys. Yucatán black howler males are larger than those of any other Central American monkey species. On average, males weigh 11.4 kg (25 lb) and females weigh 6.4 kg (14 lb). The body is between 521 and 639 mm (20.5 and 25.2 in) in length, excluding the tail. The tail is between 590 and 690 mm (23 and 27 in) long. Adults of both sexes have long, black hair and a prehensile tail, while infants have brown fur. Males over four months old have white scrotums.

The Yucatán black howler shares several adaptations with other species of howler monkey that allow it to pursue a folivorous diet (mostly leaves). Its molars have high shearing crests, to help it eat the leaves. The male of the species has an enlarged hyoid bone near the vocal cords. This hyoid bone amplifies the male howler's calls, allowing it to locate other males without expending much energy, which is important, since leaves are a low-energy food. Howling occurs primarily at dawn and at dusk.

The Yucatán black howler is diurnal and arboreal. It lives in groups of generally one or two adult males, with a ratio of about 1.3 females for every male. Groups generally have between two and 10 members, including juveniles, but groups as large as 16 members have been studied. The home range is between 3 and 25 hectares. Population density can exceed 250 monkeys per square kilometer in the Community Baboon Sanctuary in Belize.

The Yucatán black howler's diet includes mostly leaves and fruit. Flowers also make up a small part of the diet. The breadnut tree can provide as much as 86% of the monkey's diet during some seasons.

As with other howler monkey species, the majority of the Yucatán black howler's day is spent resting. Eating makes up about a quarter of the day, moving about 10% of the day, and the remainder of the day is spent in socializing and other activities.

Females reach sexual maturity at four, and males reach sexual maturity between six and eight years old. Males leave their natal group upon reaching sexual maturity, but females generally remain with their natal group. They can live up to 20 years.

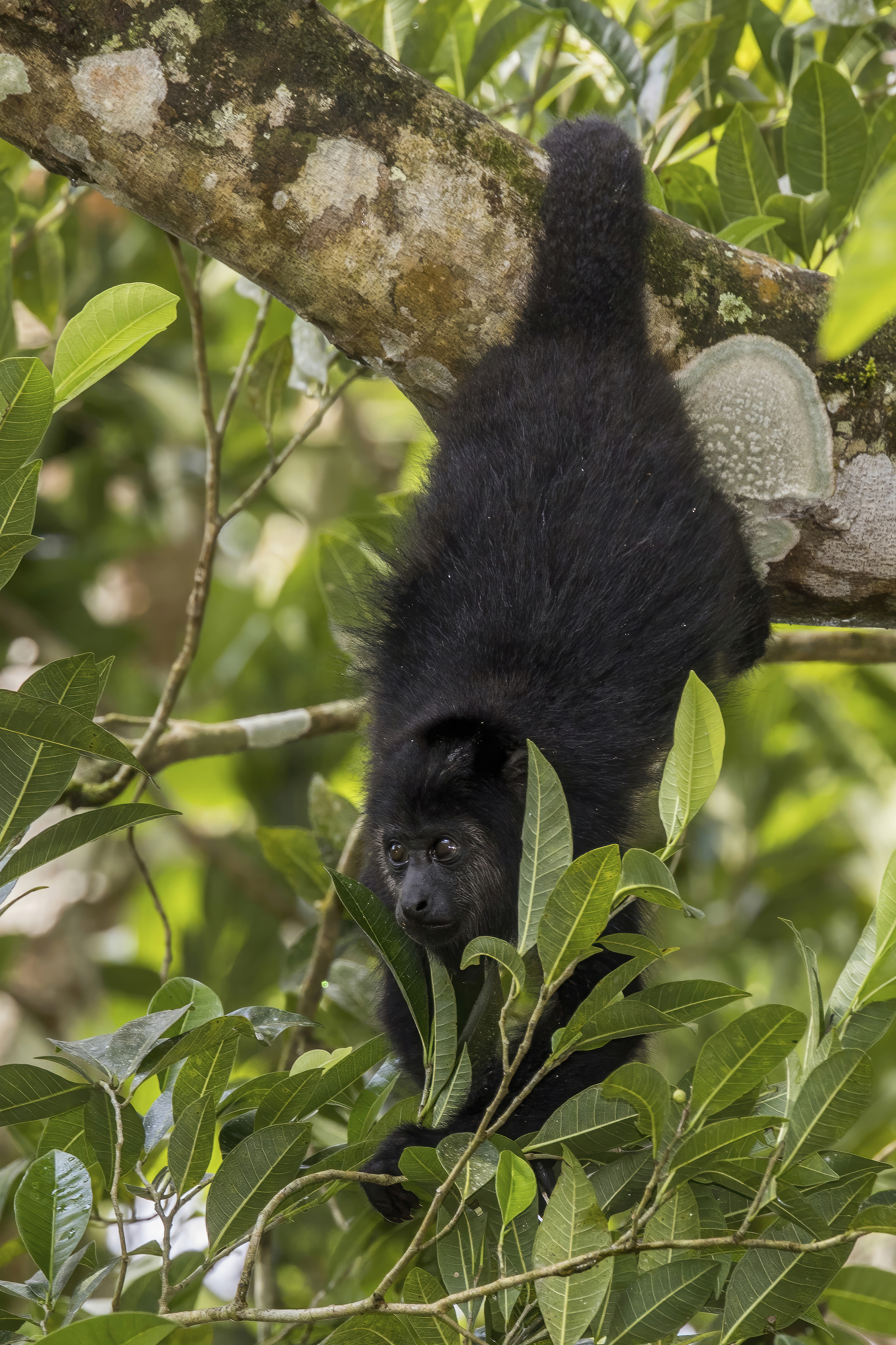
feeding, Belize

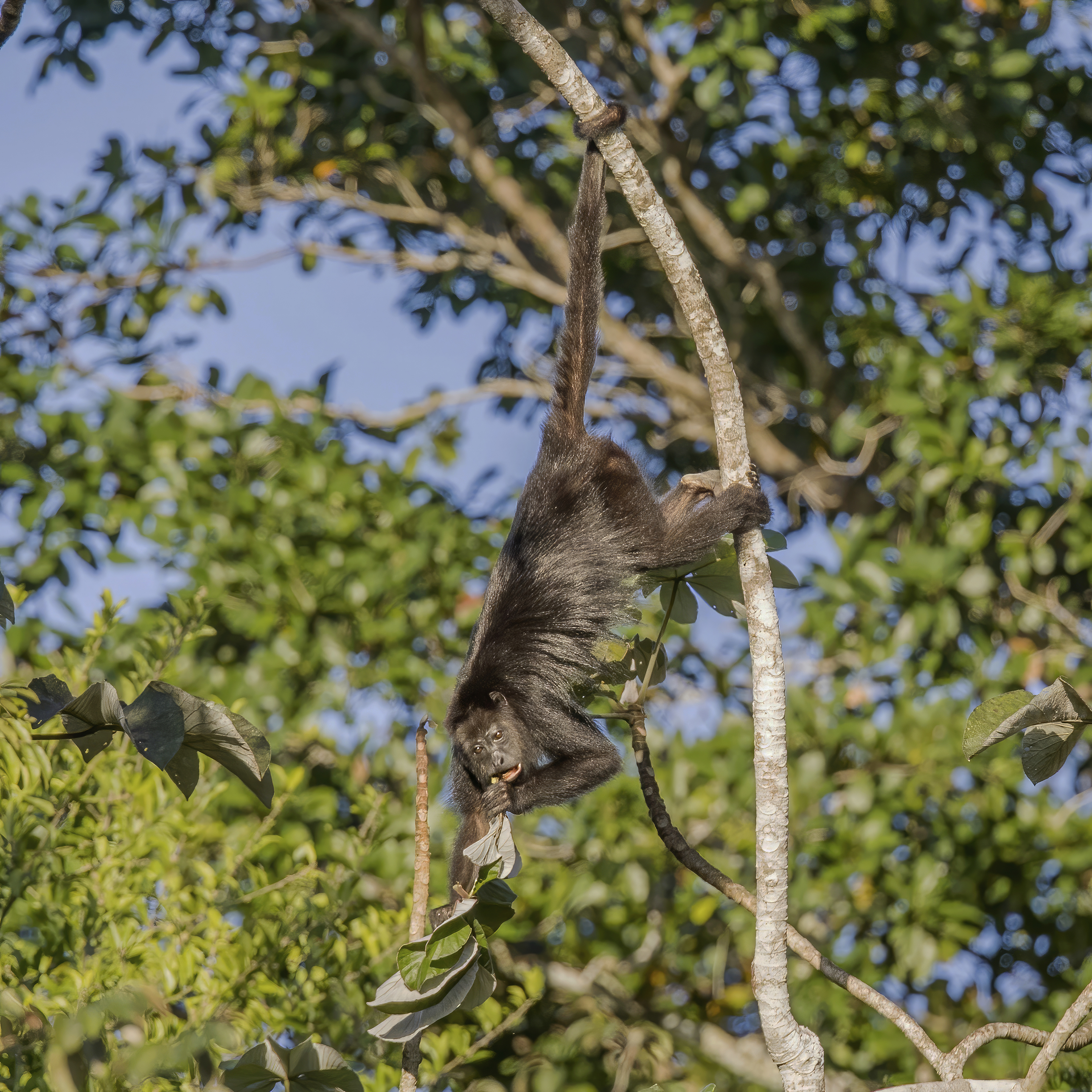
feeding, Guatemala

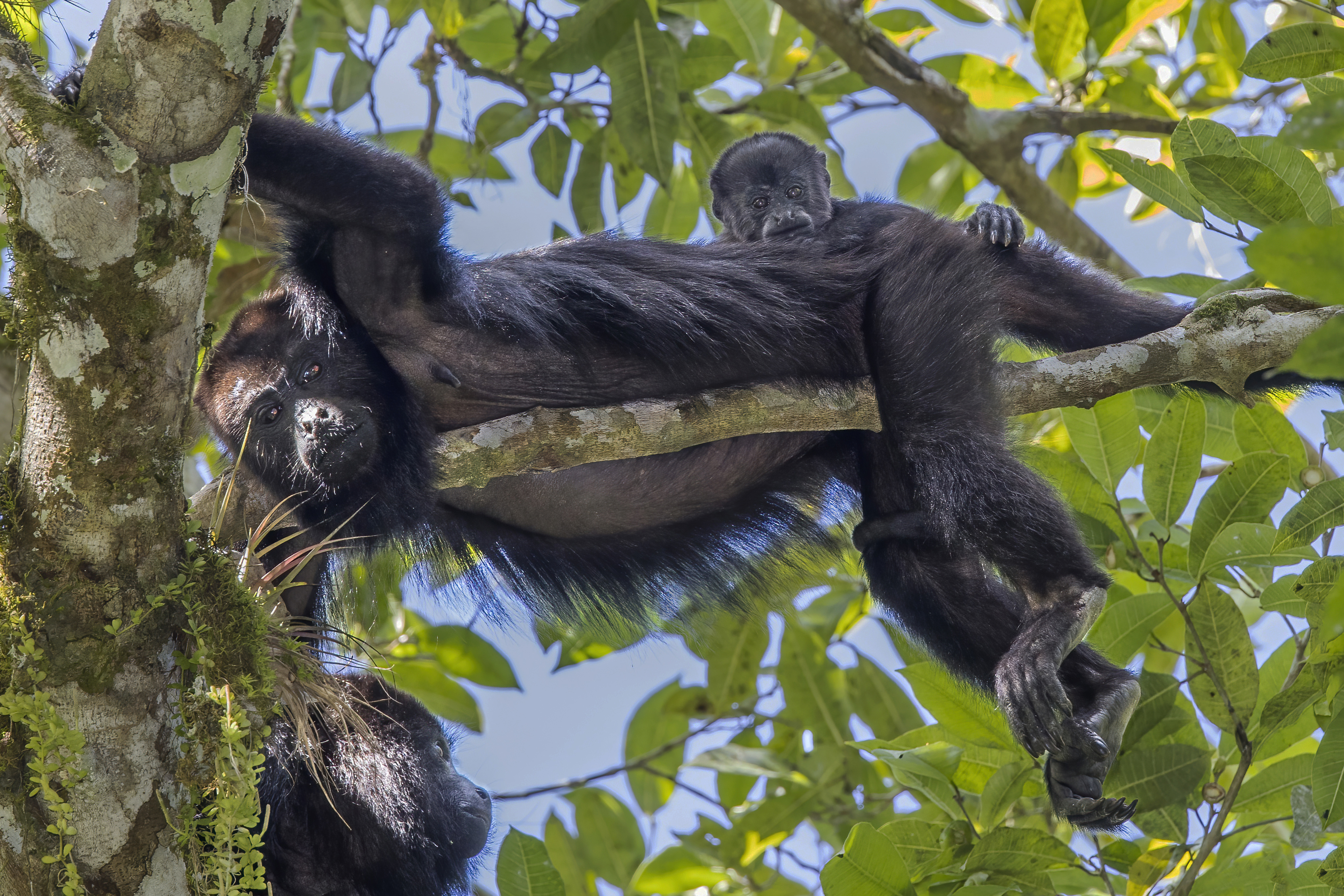
with baby, Guatemala

=== Conservation status ===
The Yucatán black howler belongs to the New World monkey family Atelidae, which contains howler monkeys, spider monkeys, woolly monkeys and muriquis. It is a member of the howler monkey genus Alouatta. No subspecies are recognized.

The species is considered to be endangered by the International Union for Conservation of Nature because the species population is expected to decline by up to 60% over the next 30 years. Threats to the species include habitat loss, hunting, and capture as pets. In Belize, it is illegal to hunt this species.

== Sympatry ==
The Yucatán black howler is sympatric with the mantled howler along the edges of its range in Mexico and Guatemala near the Yucatan Peninsula. A theory for how this sympatry occurred and why the Yucatán black howler has such a restricted range is the ancestors of the Yucatán black howler and the Central American squirrel monkey migrated to Central America from South America during the late Miocene or Pliocene. However, passage through the Isthmus of Panama then closed for a period due to rising sea levels, and later opened up to another wave of migration about two million years ago. These later migrants, ancestors to modern populations of white-headed capuchins, mantled howlers and Geoffroy's spider monkeys, out-competed the earlier migrants, leading to the restricted range of the Yucatán black howler (and the Central American squirrel monkey).

== Predation ==
Yucatán black howlers are occasionally eaten by jaguars, cougars, and harpy eagles. Other cats, large birds of prey, and large arboreal snakes are also potential predators.

== See also ==
- Community Baboon Sanctuary
- Black howler (Alouatta caraya)
