= Belize District =

District of Belize

- District
- District of Belize
- Location of Belize District in Belize
- Coordinates: 17°15′N 88°10′W
- Country: Belize
- Capital: Belize City

Area
  - Total: 4,204 km^{2} (1,623 sq mi)

Population (2024 estimate)
  - Total: 116,914
  - Density: 27.81/km^{2} (72.03/sq mi)
- Demonym: Belizean

Ethnic groups (2022 census)
  - Creole: 57.1%
  - Hispanic/ Mestizo: 33.0%
  - Garifuna: 3.3%
  - East Indian: 1.5%
  - Mayan: 1.4% (Note: 0.8% Kʼicheʼ, 0.5% Mopan, 0.1% Yucatec)
  - White: 0.8%
  - Mennonite: 0.3%
  - Chinese: 0.3%
  - Indian: 0.2%
  - Other: 0.7%

Languages spoken (2022 census)
  - English: 80.4%
  - Creole: 68.3%
  - Spanish: 30.2%
  - Garifuna: 1.5%
  - Mayan: 0.9% (Note: 0.5% Qʼeqchiʼ, 0.3% Mopan, 0.1% Yucatec)
  - Chinese: 0.4%
  - German: 0.3% (Note: Includes speakers of both Plautdietsch and Standard German)
  - Hindi: 0.2%
  - Other: 0.3%
- Time zone: UTC -6 (Central Standard Time)
- ISO 3166 code: BZ-BZ
- Website: www.belizedistrict.com

Belize is a district of the nation of Belize. Its capital is Belize City.

== Geography ==
Most of the Belize District is in the east central mainland of Belize; the Belize District also includes various offshore islands, including Ambergris Caye, Caye Caulker, St. George's Caye, Caye Chapel, English Caye, Goff's Caye, and Turneffe Atoll. Ambergris Caye and Caye Caulker are considered two of the country's primary tourism areas. The longest river in the country, the Belize River, passes through the district and joins the Caribbean Sea along its coast. The Northern River, Sibun River, and Manatee River are also in this District.

=== Settlements ===
San Pedro Town, which is situated on the island of Ambergris Caye, is also in the Belize District. Caye Caulker and St. George's Caye are the island villages in this district. Maskall, Bomba, Corozalito, Santana, Lucky Strike, Rockstone Pond, Boston, Crooked Tree, Biscayne, May Pen, Gardenia, Grace Bank, Sand Hill, Lord's Bank, Ladyville, Burrel Boom, Buttercup, Scotland Halfmoon, Flowers Bank, Bermudian Landing, Isabella Bank, Double Head Cabbage, Willows Bank, Saint Paul's Bank, Big Falls, Rancho Dolores, Hattieville, Freetown Sibun, Gracie Rock, La Democracia, and Gales Point are all mainland villages in the Belize District. The Crooked Tree and Monkey Bay Wildlife Sanctuaries, the Belize Zoo (30 miles west of Belize City), as well as the ancient Maya ruins of Altun Ha are all in this district.

== History ==
The Belize District was the area first settled by Europeans. They developed estates along the rivers and creeks; because these waterways were their transportation highways. Many of the estates were referred to as the owner's 'bank'(as in the banks of a river). Therefore, Mr. Lord's estate on the bank of the Belize River became Lord's Bank and Mr. Flowers' home place on this same river became Flowers Bank. Many of these old estates have grown into villages; while other places on our map such as Baker, Bob Eiley, Bocotora, Butcher Burns, Lime Walk, More Force, Nago Bank, Washing Tree, Cedar Bank, Churchyard, Egypt, Watters Bank, and White Hill are old estates which did not become villages. Some places like Davis Bank and Tropical Park have now become parts of larger communities.

== Demographics ==
In 2005 mid-year population estimate to the Belize District was 87,000 with an estimated number of 69,200 of these living in the two urban areas. Belize City is by far the large of the two with an estimated population of 60,800. San Pedro Town has a population of about 8,900. The population of all the villages and outlying communities combined is about 17,800 people.

=== Ethnicity ===
Ethnicity
Ethnicity	2010		2022	
%	Number	%	Number	%
Creole	42,107	48.11%	64,816	57.04%
Mestizo	26,974	30.82%	37,503	33.00%
Garifuna	3,578	4.09%	3,766	3.31%
East Indian; Indian	2,041; 320	2.33% 0.36%	1,715; 274	1.51% 0.24%
European: * British (Anglo-Celtic) * German (Mennonite)	1,509; 1,156; 353	1.72% 1.32% 0.40%	1,272; 887; 385	1.12% 0.78% 0.34%
Qʼeqchi Maya	837	0.96%	959	0.84%
Mopan Maya	627	0.71%	517	0.45%
Chinese/Asian	1,220	1.39%	379	0.33%
Other	1,475	1.68%	895	0.79%
Not stated	–	–	1,534	1.35%
Mixed	6,835	7.80%	–	–
Total	87,523	100%	113,630	100%

=== Population and housing ===
2010 Population and Housing Census has Belize district's total population as 89,247 residents, of this 43,980 are males and 45,267 are females. The total number of households is 27,161 and the average household size is 3.3.

== Political divisions ==
Politically, Belize District contains 13 constituencies according to the Elections and Boundaries Department. 10 of these are in Belize City proper; the remainder are classified as rural.

=== Belize City constituencies ===
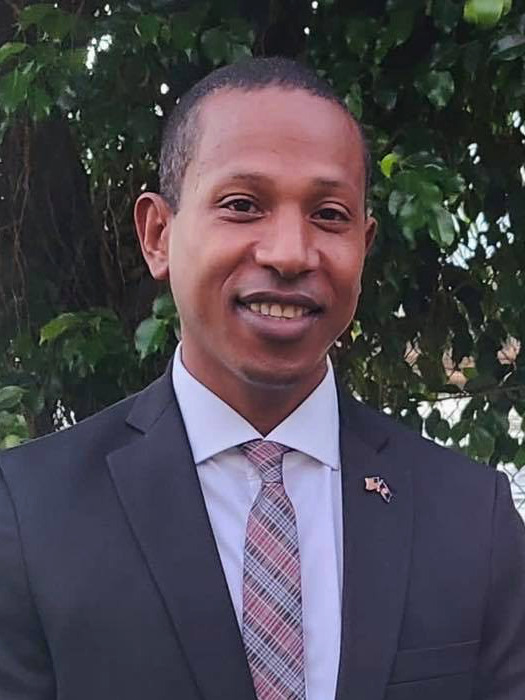
Shyne Barrow

The 10 constituencies that fall within the city limits of Belize City are: Albert, Caribbean Shores, Collet, Fort George, Freetown, Lake Independence, Mesopotamia, Pickstock, Port Loyola, and Queen's Square. Both Leader of the Opposition Shyne Barrow (Mesopotamia) and former Leader of the Opposition Francis Fonseca (Freetown) represent Belize City constituencies.

=== Belize Rural North ===
Belize Rural North contains the northern half of mainland Belize District, including Maskall, Lucky Strike and villages in the Belize River Valley and along the Northern Highway, except for Ladyville and Lord's Bank. Its current representative is Marconi Leal of the People's United Party.

=== Belize Rural Central ===
Belize Rural Central is limited to the southern half of mainland Belize District and containing the important villages of Ladyville, Lord's Bank, Western Paradise, Hattieville, and Gales Point. As of 2012, the PUP's Dolores Balderamos is area representative.

=== Belize Rural South ===
Belize Rural South contains the offshore islands of the Belize District including Ambergris Caye, Caye Caulker, Caye Chapel, St. George's Caye, and the Turneffe Islands. Its main town is San Pedro on Ambergris Caye. The current representative is the UDP's Manuel Heredia. Ambergris Caye is also a pene-exclave, and it is the land that is completely separated through the rest of the district and in the country.
