= Scotland Halfmoon =

Village in Belize

Coordinates: 17.571°N 88.507°W

Scotland Halfmoon is a populated settlement located in the nation of Belize. It is a mainland village that is located in Belize District, between Burrell Boom and Bermudian Landing.

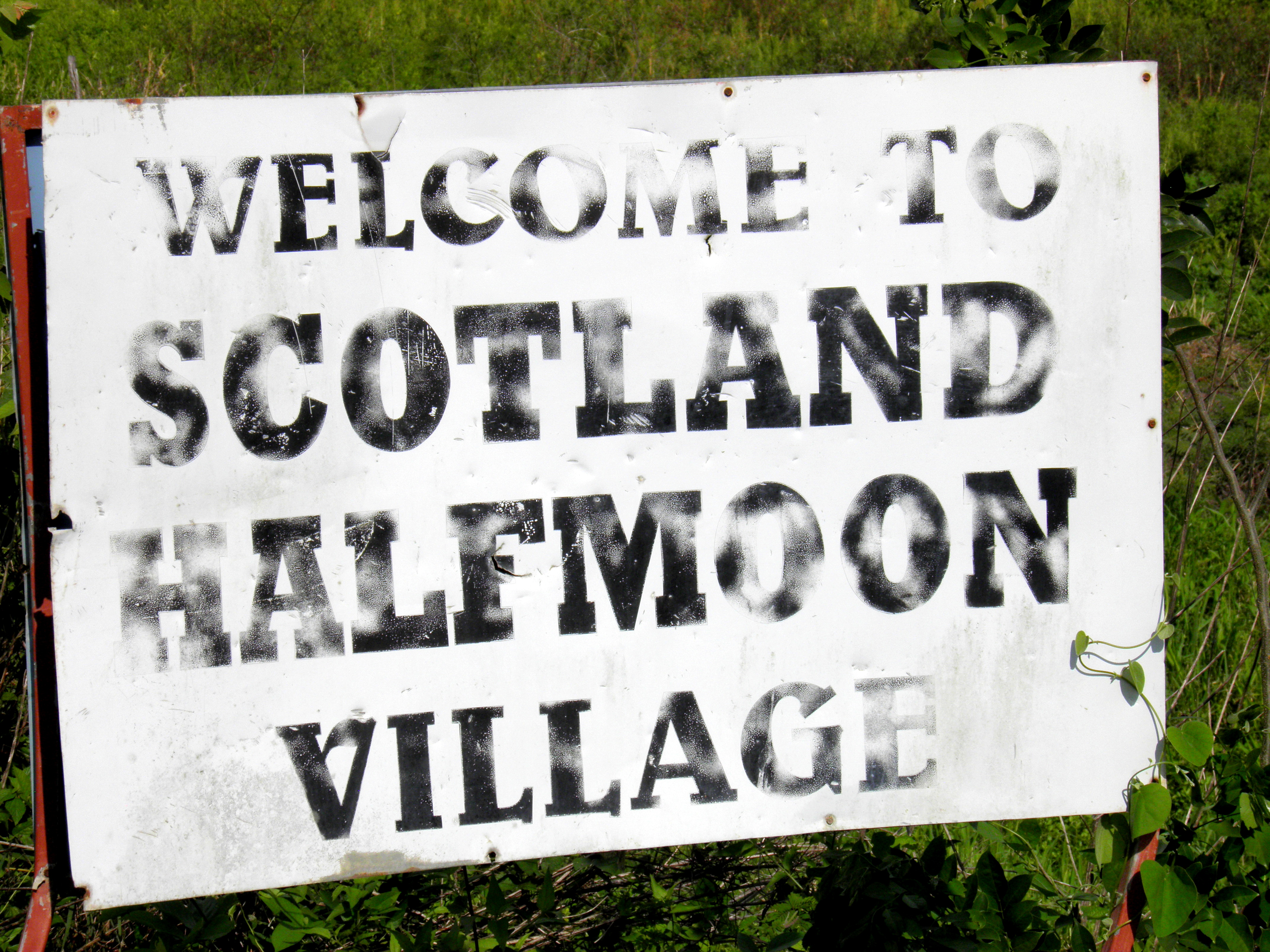
Scotland Halfmoon sign
