= Maskall =

Coordinates: 17°52′N 88°18′W

- Village
- Interactive map of Maskall

Maskall is a settlement located in the nation of Belize. It is a mainland village located in Belize District. It is 39 miles north of Belize City.
