= Bermudian Landing =

Village in Belize

Coordinates: 17°33′N 88°31′W

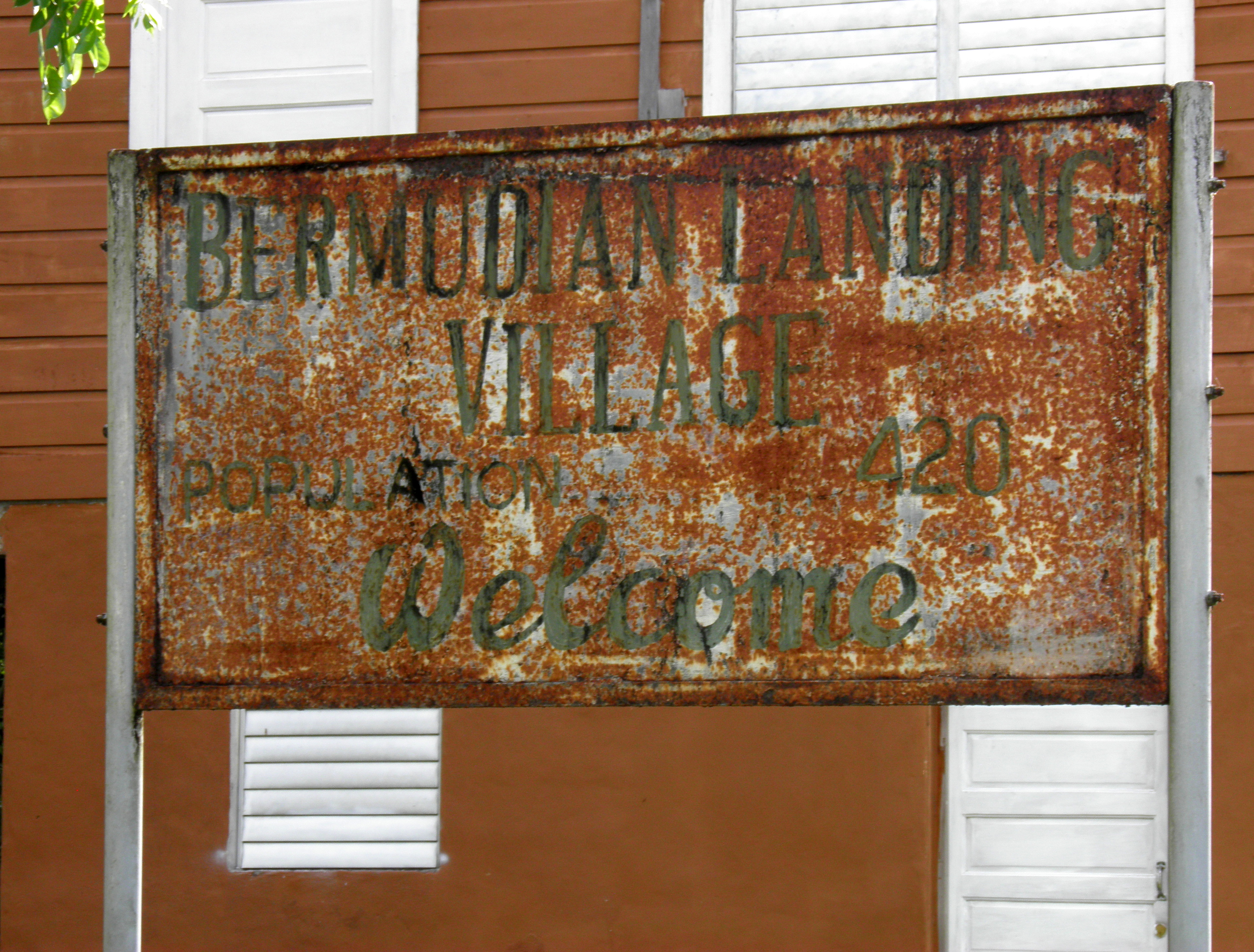
Bermudian Landing sign

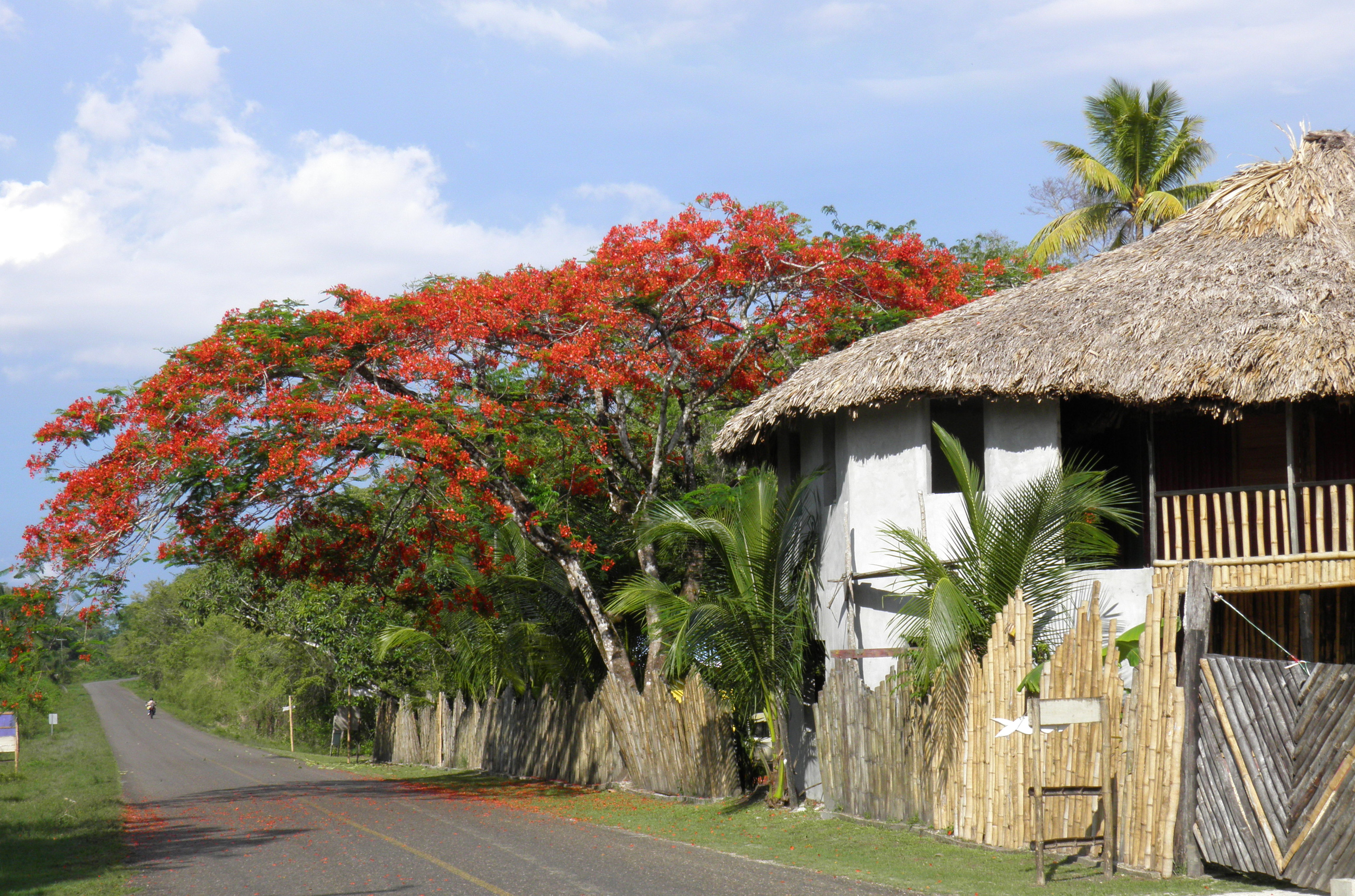
Bermudian Landing street scene

Bermudian Landing is a village in the nation of Belize, located near Scotland Halfmoon in Belize District. The name comes from the Bermuda grass planted by the early loggers to feed their oxen, who were used to drag the mahogany to the landing.

== Demographics ==
At the time of the 2010 Census, Bermudian Landing had a population of 183. Of these, 79.2% were Creole, 6.6% Asian, 6.0% Mixed, 2.2% Ketchi Maya, 1.6% Caucasian, 1.1% Mestizo, 0.5% East Indian, 0.5% Garifuna, 0.5% Hindu and 0.5% others.
