= Bulletwood =

Bulletwood is a common name for several plants or trees and may refer to:

- Manilkara bidentata and other Manilkara spp.
- Mimusops elengi, from India to South East Asia, Asian bulletwood
- Mimusops afra, South Africa and South East Africa
- Planchonella australis, yellow, silver bulletwood
- Pouteria pallida, a Caribbean tree, bastard bulletwood
- Sideroxylon salicifolium, Planchonella myrsinoides, white bulletwood
- Humiria balsamifera, from Brazil and North South America, bastard bulletwood
