= Burrell Boom =

- Location in Belize
- Coordinates: 17°34′00″N 88°24′00″W
- Country: Belize
- District: Belize District
- Constituency: Belize Rural North
- Climate: Am

Burrell Boom is on the Belize River twenty miles above Belize City, Belize. Tourists pass through this historic village on their way to the Community Baboon Sanctuary, where the population of black howler monkeys has grown to over 2,000.

== Demographics ==
At the time of the 2010 census, Burrell Boom had a population of 2,218. Of these, 50.8% were Creole, 25.2% Mestizo, 15.2% Mixed, 2.6% East Indian, 1.3% African, 1.3% Caucasian, 1.0% Garifuna, 0.8% Asian, 0.4% Ketchi Maya, 0.3% Mennonite, 0.1% Yucatec Maya and 0.1% others.

== History ==
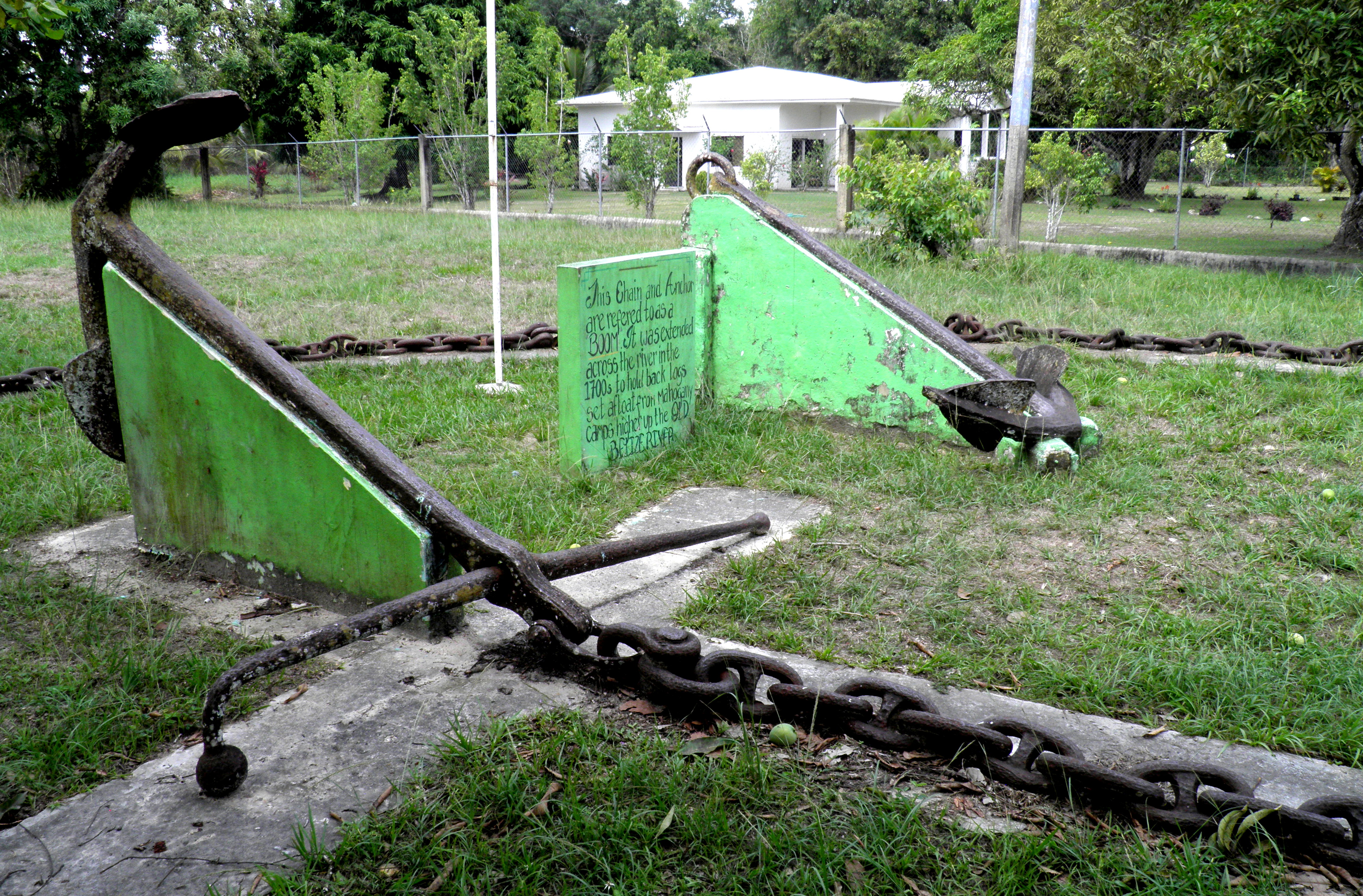

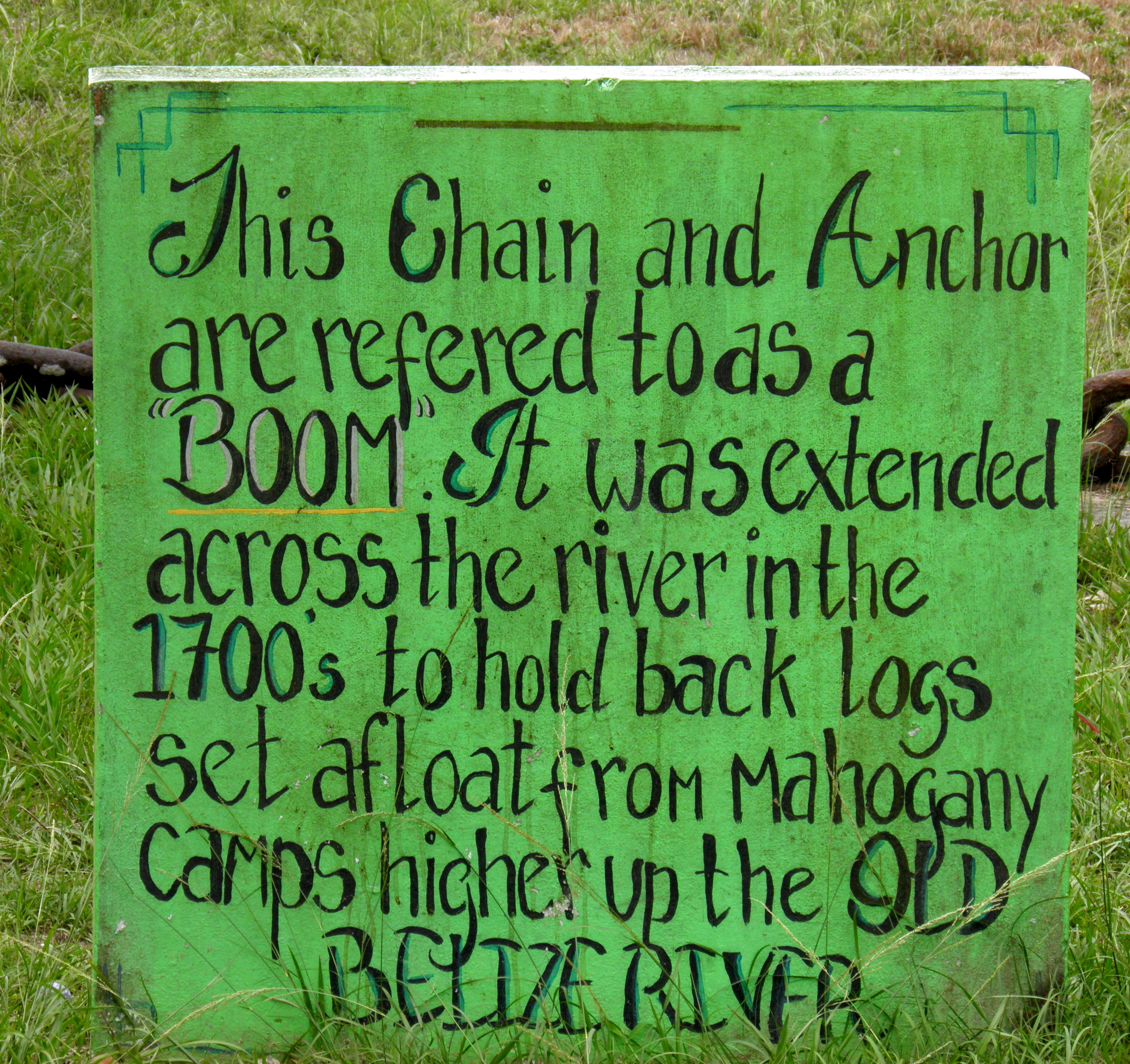

During the 18th century, loggers settled along the Belize River, floating logwood and later mahogany logs down to Belize Town. Burrell Boom grew as a gathering and milling point for these logs, with its boom stretched across the river.

In 1837 the Methodist ministers Thomas Jefferies and John Greenwood built a chapel in Burrell Boom, and Catholic missionary activities ensued along the whole Belize River from the mid-nineteenth century. The village has now both Methodist and Catholic elementary schools. Each Good Friday Anglican, Methodist, and Catholic communities in town gather for an ecumenical service which rotates among the churches. A number of refugees from neighboring republics have settled near the town and drawn Jehovah's Witnesses on mission to the area.

After 2000 the link between the Northern and Western highways was improved, passing near to Burrell Boom and bringing the village greater prominence.

== Climate ==
Burrell Boom has a tropical monsoon climate.

Climate data for Burrell Boom
Month	Jan	Feb	Mar	Apr	May	Jun	Jul	Aug	Sep	Oct	Nov	Dec	Year
Daily mean °C (°F)	22.6 (72.7)	23.6 (74.5)	24.4 (75.9)	26.2 (79.2)	27.0 (80.6)	27.0 (80.6)	26.5 (79.7)	26.3 (79.3)	26.6 (79.9)	25.8 (78.4)	23.8 (74.8)	23.1 (73.6)	25.2 (77.4)
Average precipitation mm (inches)	119 (4.7)	65 (2.6)	55 (2.2)	47 (1.9)	112 (4.4)	297 (11.7)	249 (9.8)	204 (8.0)	275 (10.8)	262 (10.3)	191 (7.5)	157 (6.2)	2,033 (80.1)
Source: Climate-Data.org
