= Sandhill, Belize =

Coordinates: 17°38′N 88°22′W

Sandhill, Belize is a populated settlement located in the nation of Belize. It is a mainland village located in the Belize District.
