= Belizean Creole people =

Ethnic group descended from Africans and European logcutters

Belizean Creoles
Total population
- approx. 260,000 (including 21% of the Belizean population)

Regions with significant populations

Languages
- Predominantly Belizean Creole, English, Spanish

Religion
- Predominantly Protestantism, Catholicism, Rastafari minorities

Related ethnic groups
- Nicaraguan Creoles, Afro-Jamaicans, Baymen, Caracoles, Raizales, Afro-Caribbeans, West Indians, African Americans, Louisiana Creoles, Sierra Leone Creoles, West Africans

Belizean Creoles, also known as Kriols, are a Creole ethnic group native to Belize.

Belizean Creoles are primarily mixed-raced descendants of enslaved West and Central Africans who were brought to the British Honduras (present-day Belize along the Bay of Honduras) as well as the English and Scottish log cutters, known as the Baymen who trafficked them. Over the years they have also intermarried with Miskito from Nicaragua, Jamaicans and other Caribbean people, Mestizos, Europeans, Garifunas, Mayas, and Chinese and Indians. The latter were brought to Belize as indentured laborers. Majority of Kriols trace their ancestry to several of the aforementioned groups.

The Belize Kriol language, developed initially by interaction among the Africans and Europeans, was historically spoken only by them. The Creoles constituted the majority of the population until the 1980s and became synonymous with the Belizean national identity. In the 21st century, Creoles are found predominantly in urban areas, such as Belize City, and in most coastal towns and villages.

== Ethnicity ==
Until the early 1980s, Belizean Creoles constituted close to 60% of the population of Belize. But, the demographics of the country have changed markedly. Because of the combined effects of immigration to Belize of people from other Central American countries, and emigration of an estimated 85,000 Creoles, most to the United States, in the early 21st century the Creoles make up only about 25% of the population of Belize. As a result of centuries of mixed-race ancestry, persons identifying as Creole express a wide range of physical features, ranging from dark skin and kinky hair, to fair skin and blonde hair, with many gradations in between. The term Creole denotes an ethnic culture rather than any narrow standard of physical appearance.

In Belize, Creole is the standard term for any person of at least partial Black African descent who is not Garinagu, or any person who speaks Kriol as a first or sole language. Thus, immigrants from Africa and the West Indies who have settled in Belize and intermarried with locals may also identify as Creole. The concept of Creole as mixed race has embraced nearly any individual who has Afro-European ancestry combined with any other ethnicity, including Mestizo or Maya.

When the National Kriol Council began standardizing the orthography for Kriol, it decided to promote the spelling Kriol only for the language but to continue to use the spelling Creole to refer to the people in English.

== History ==
According to local research, the Belizean Creoles descended from unions between polyglot buccaneers and European settlers who developed the logwood trade in the 17th century, and the African slaves whom they kidnapped and used as enslaved laborers to cut and ship the logwood. The National Kriol Council of Belize says that black slaves had been used as workers on the Central American coast from the 16th century and earlier, and were also used by the Spanish further down the coast. By 1724, the British too were acquiring slaves from Jamaica and elsewhere to cut logwood and later mahogany. The earliest reference to African slaves in the British settlement of Belize appeared in a 1724 Spanish missionary's account, which stated that the British recently had been importing them from Jamaica and Bermuda. The Europeans sexually abused the female slaves, resulting in numerous mixed-race children.

In the second half of the eighteenth century, the slave population hovered around 3,000, making up about three-quarters of the total population. Most slaves, even if they were brought through West Indian markets, were born in Africa, primarily from Ghana (Ga and Ewe people, Ashanti - Fante), around the Bight of Benin and Bight of Biafra; Nigeria (Yoruba, Igbo, Efik); the Congo, and Angola. Other slaves were taken from the Wolof, Fula, Hausa and Kongo peoples.

The Igbo (known as Eboe or Ibo) seem to have been particularly numerous; one section of Belize Town was still known as Eboe Town in the first half of the 19th century. At first, many slaves maintained African ethnic identifications and cultural practices. Gradually, however, they combined some of their cultures, as well as adapting to elements of Europeans ones; in this process of creolization, their descendants created a new, syncretic Creole culture.

By most accounts, the slaves in Belize led a better life than most in the West Indies, but were still mistreated. Many escaped to neighboring Spanish colonies, or formed small maroon settlements in the forest. These slaves reputedly assisted in the defense of the fledgling settlement for much of the late 18th century, particularly in the 1798 Battle of St. George's Caye. This history has been debated and generates controversy in Belize.

The Creoles settled where they had work: mainly in Belize Town (now Belize City) and along the banks of the Belize River in the original logwood settlements, including Burrell Boom, Bermudian Landing, Crooked Tree, Gracie Rock, Rancho Dolores, Flowers Bank, and Belmopan. There were also substantial numbers in and around the plantations south of Belize City and Placencia. Many Creoles were involved in the trade in live sea turtles, and other fisheries. During the 19th century, they spread out to all the districts, particularly Dangriga and Monkey River, as the colony grew. Their sense of pride led to occasional clashes with authority, such as the 1894 currency devaluation riots, which foreshadowed greater conflicts to come.

In the 20th century, the Creoles took the lead in organizing development of the settlement. Riots in 1919 and 1934, combined with terrible conditions resulting from a disastrous hurricane in 1931, led to development of Belize's first trade unions. From that organizing, they developed the first political party, the People's United Party (PUP). Creoles continue to lead the nation in politics. But conditions in Belize City worsened after another major hurricane in 1961. Shortly thereafter large scale emigration began (and continues) to the United States and England. From those countries, working individuals sent back money to assist families left behind.

Attempts to unite Creoles for development, such as the United Black Association for Development, have met mixed results.

== Culture ==
As part of the September celebrations, the annual Creole Festival is held on the grounds of the House of Culture. The festival is notable as part of an effort by Belize's Creole population to assert itself as a distinct group, rich with its own traditions.

=== Maypole ===
Maypole is a celebration that includes a maypole, a tall wooden pole, decorated with several long colored ribbons suspended from the top. This is similar to Palo de Mayo or Maypole in RAAS region in Nicaragua. There is no definite answer as to how the custom reached Nicaragua. Many historians note that there are many differences in the celebration and that it came from the Nicaraguan Creoles who inhabited Nicaragua's Caribbean coast; other historians believe it came indirectly from Jamaica. Maypoles were historically also part of traditional British customs in England.

The traditional fire sambai of Gales Point Manatee is an unusual Creole dance that survives from colonial times. In that period, slaves met in different parts of Belize City in "tribes," based on their African region of origin, to celebrate the Christmas holidays. Traditionally the group would form a big circle in the night around a full moon in the center of a square. One person at a time would go in the middle of the ring to dance. The male dance is different from that of the female because it is a fertility dance. The dance marks the time when girls and boys who are considered sexually mature may dance in public as part of their passage to adulthood.

== Music ==
From colonial days, music and dance have been an essential part of the Creole culture, as they were in contributing cultures. Drum-led dancing was a major part of Christmas and other celebrations in Creole communities. A style of music called Brukdown originated from the all-night "brams" or parties thrown by Creole families; these focused on both social commentary and hijinks. Brukdown is a genre of Belizean music.

Wilfred Peters, Brukdown's most well-known contemporary performer and innovator, is regarded as a Belizean national icon. The music is a mixture of European harmonies, African syncopated rhythms and call-and-response format, and lyrical elements from the native peoples of the area. In its modern form, brukdown is a rural folk music, associated especially with the logging towns of the Belizean interior. Traditional instruments include the banjo, guitar, drums, dingaling bell, accordion and a donkey's jawbone, played by running a stick up and down the teeth. Brukdown remains a rural, rarely recorded genre. This music and the social gatherings associated with it are on the decline as youths adopt the cultures of the outside world.

== Food and drink ==
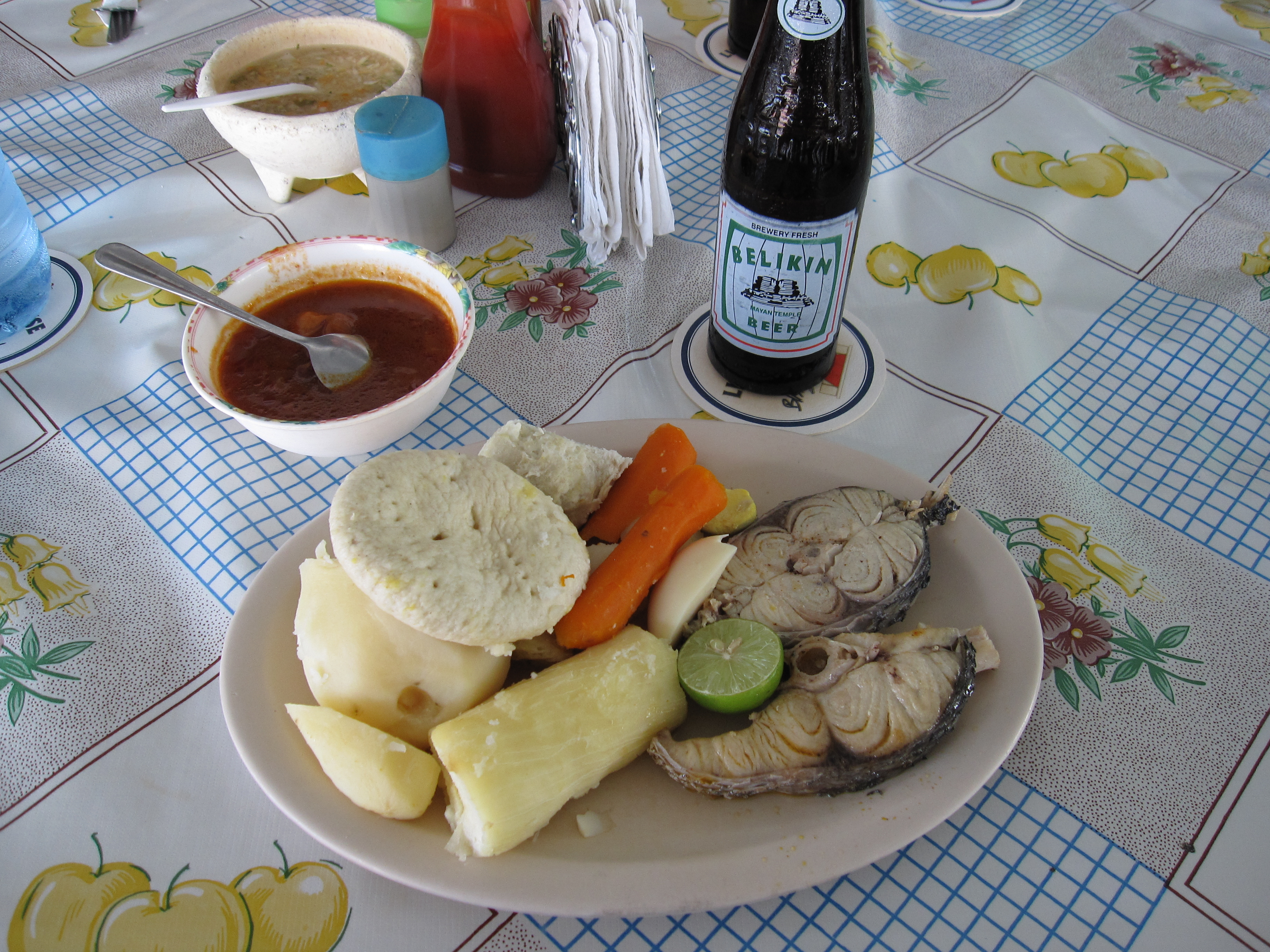
Belizean boil up. A combination of various boiled starches, vegetables and "bile cake", accompanied with either fish or pig tail

Among the main staples of a Creole dinner are rice and beans with some type of meat, for example stewed chicken, baked chicken, stewed pork, stewed beef etc.; salad, whether potato, vegetable, or coleslaw; seafoods, including fish, conch, lobster; some game meats, including iguana, deer, peccary and gibnut; and ground foods such as cassava, potatoes, cocoa and plantains. Fresh juice or water are typically served, occasionally replaced by soft drinks and alcoholic beverages (homemade wines made from sorrel, berries, cashew, sorosi, grapefruit and rice are especially common). Breakfasts usually include Creole bread and Kriol bun, johnny-cakes and frycakes (also called fry jacks).

Since the late 20th century, Creoles have adopted foods from other groups, particularly "Spanish" dishes made with tortillas. A more general national Belizean cuisine has developed and adopted traditional foods brought by the many Central American immigrants.

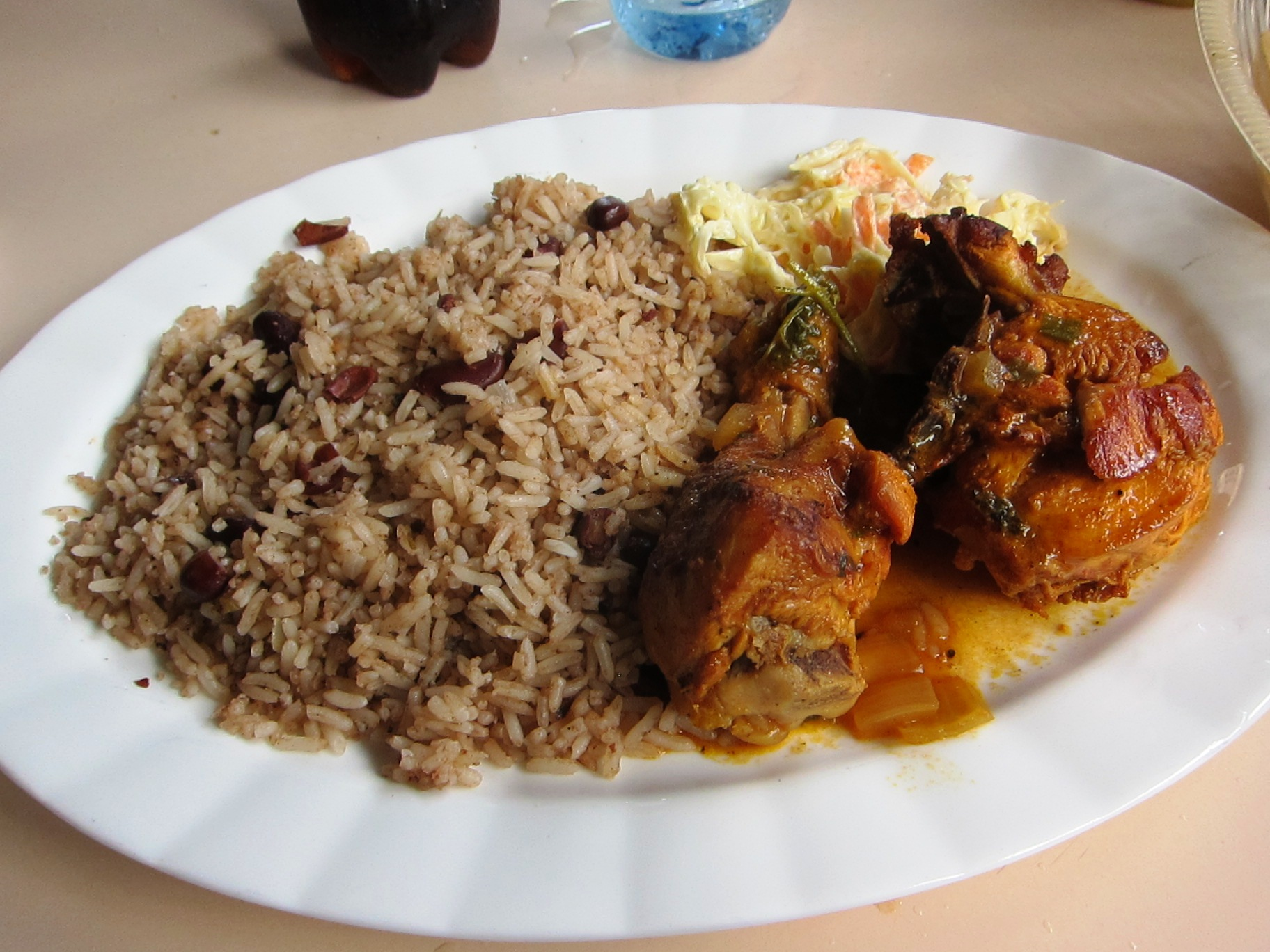
Rice and beans (with coconut milk), stewed recado chicken and potato salad

Creoles in general eat a relatively balanced diet. The bile up (or boil up) is described above. Other important Creole foods are cowfoot soup, a thick stew with cocoyam and tripe, and a wide variety of dishes made with fish. Coconut milk and oil are common ingredients, though they have become increasingly rare and expensive. A plague of "lethal yellowing" killed most of the coconut trees in the 1990s.

In Belize, cassava was traditionally made into "bammy," a small fried cassava cake related to Garifuna cassava bread. The cassava root is grated, rinsed well, dried, salted, and pressed to form flat cakes about 4 inches in diameter and 1/2-inch thick. The cakes are lightly fried, then dipped in coconut milk and fried again. Bammies were usually served as a starchy side dish with breakfast, with fish dishes, or alone as a snack. Cassava Pone (Plastic Cake) is a traditional Belizean Creole and pan-West Indian cassava flour cake, sometimes made with coconuts and raisins. Other common desserts include Sweet Potato Pone, Bread Pudding, stretch-mi-guts (a kind of taffy), tableta (coconut crisp), wangla (sesame) and powderbun, as well as a variety of pies.

== Creole organizations ==
- Universal Negro Improvement Association (UNIA)
- United Black Association for Development Education Foundation (UEF)
- National Kriol Council (NKC)
- Creole Gyal Prodokshans (local production company)
