= Belize River =

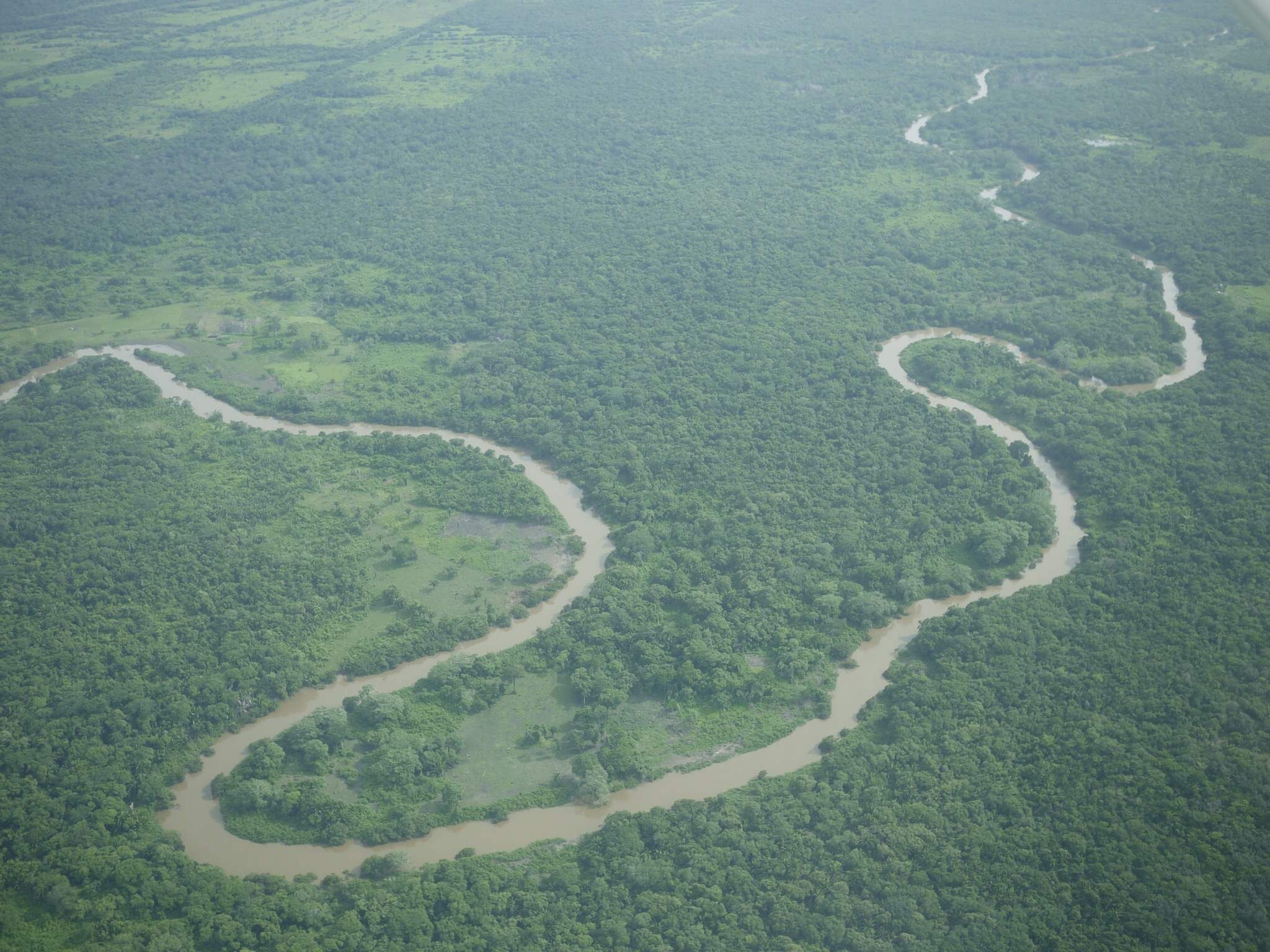
- Aerial view of the Belize River

Location
- Country: Belize

Physical characteristics
- Source
  - location: Confluence Mopan and Macal rivers
  - coordinates: 17.17841°N 89.08016°W
  - elevation: 80 m (260 ft)
- Mouth
  - location: Caribbean Sea at Belize City
  - coordinates: 17.53456°N 88.23664°W
  - elevation: 0 m (0 ft)
- Length: 290 km (180 mi) (Note: including Mopan River)
- Basin size: Caribbean Sea

The Belize River runs 290 kilometres (180 mi) through the center of Belize. It drains more than one-quarter of the country as it winds along the northern edge of the Maya Mountains to the sea just north of Belize City (17°32′N 88°14′W). The Belize River Valley is largely tropical rainforest.

Also known as the Old River, the Belize River begins where the Mopan River and Macal River join just east of San Ignacio, Belize (17°11′N 89°04′W). The Belize River – Mopan River Catchment contains over 45 percent of the population of Belize. The Belize River, in spite of 78 runs or rapids, is passable via the Mopan to the Guatemalan border. It served as the main artery of commerce and communication between the interior and the coast until well into the twentieth century, and has long been associated with forestry, of logwood (for dye) and of mahogany which survives in small stands.

Early on, loggers using the river encountered the Maya and had conflicts with them and with the Spaniards. In 1807 there was a request for "arms and ammunitions" for the loggers. In the late 1820s, the Methodist minister Thomas Wilkinson found three to four thousand men working at camps most of the year. By the late 19th century there were over 130 small settlements along the river. Burrell Boom just above Belize Town served as a catch-point for logs.

Today the Belize River is a vital source of drinking water and other domestic use for the populations living along the river; however, water quality is degraded from sediment, nutrient loading, pesticides and other toxins. The major source of degradation is the extensive deforestation in the upper reaches of the Mopan River and non-sustainable agriculture. Karper and Boles have asserted: "The greater Mopan/Belize River Catchment provides a prime example of a watershed under stress from extensive non-sustainable agricultural practices that have occurred within the region over the past three decades." Traditional slash and burn agricultural practices also contribute to watershed degradation.

== Maya sites ==
There are a number of Maya archaeological sites in the watershed of the Belize River and its tributaries: Mopan River, Macal River, and Chaa Creek. These sites include Xunantunich, Chaa Creek, and Cahal Pech.

== Gallery ==
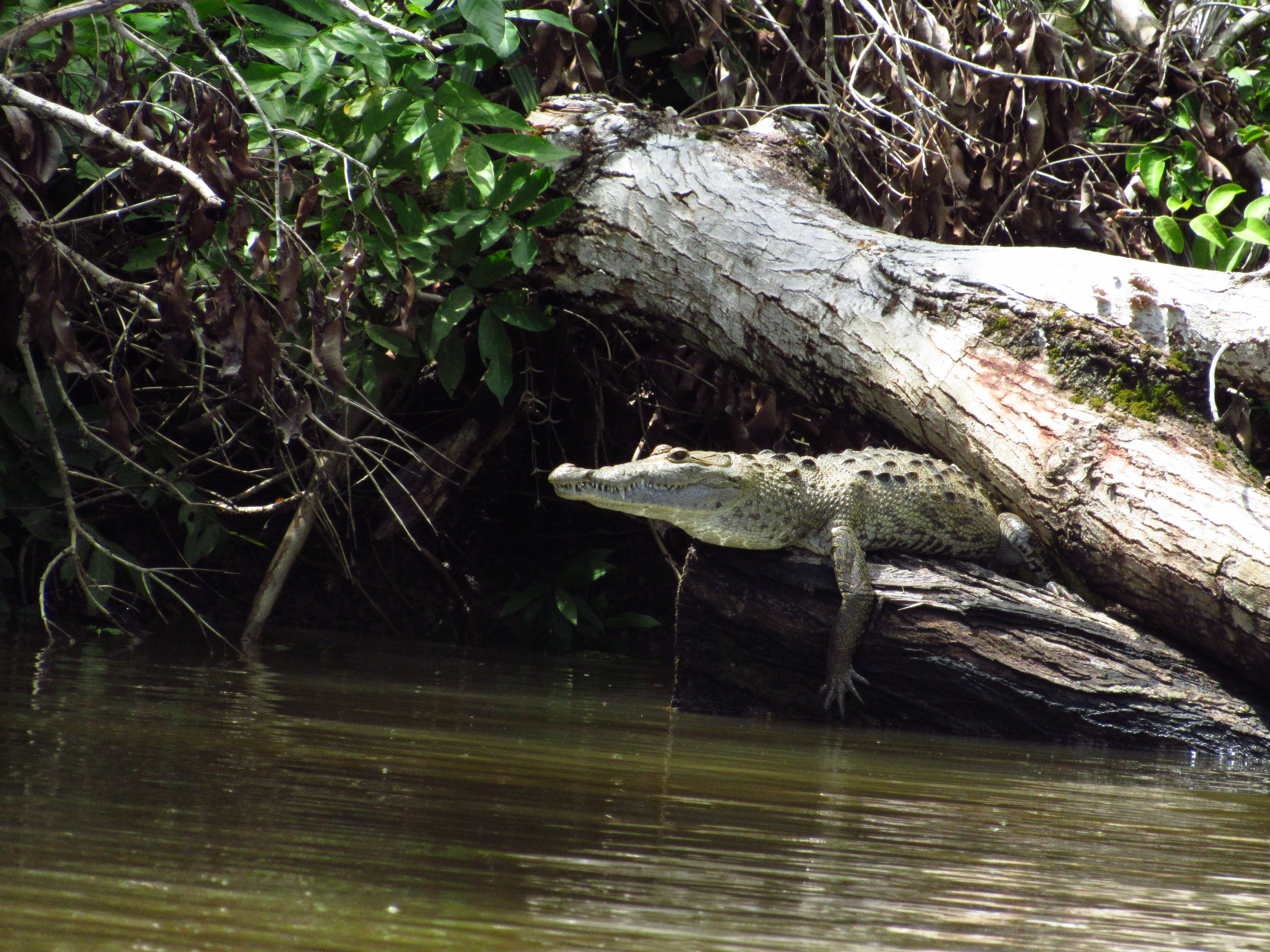
Crocodile at the edge of the river

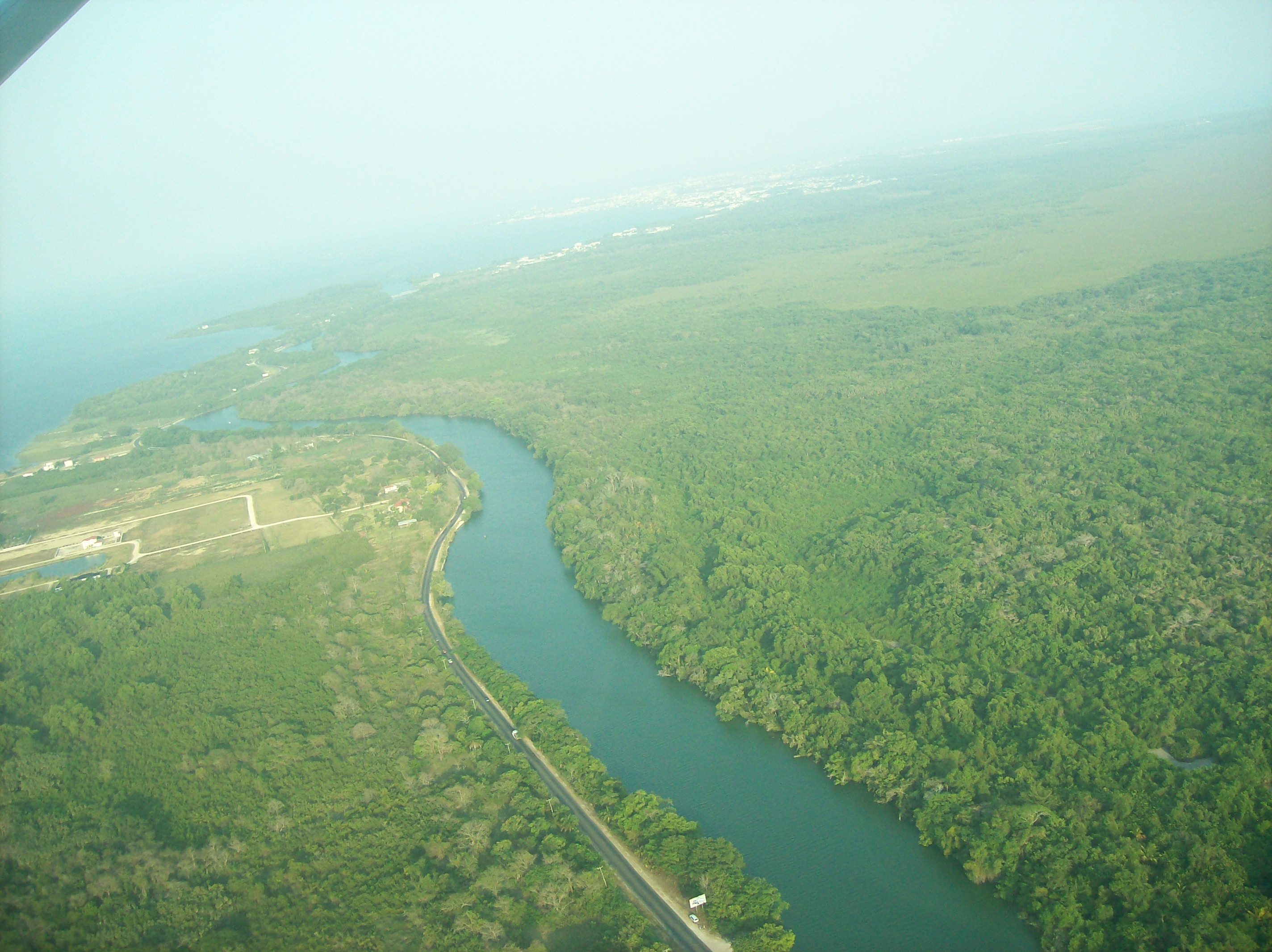
Outlet into the ocean

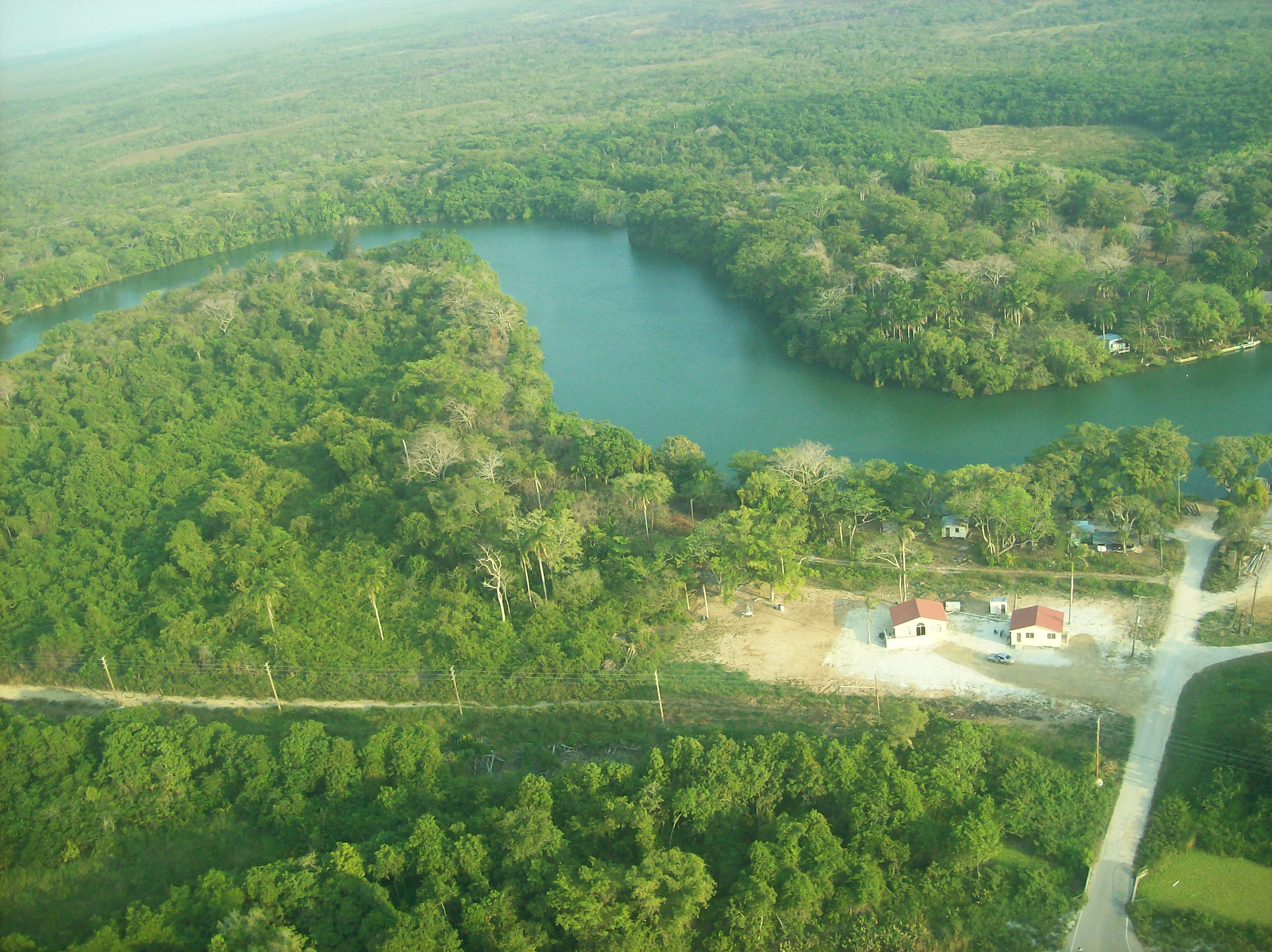
A road to the river

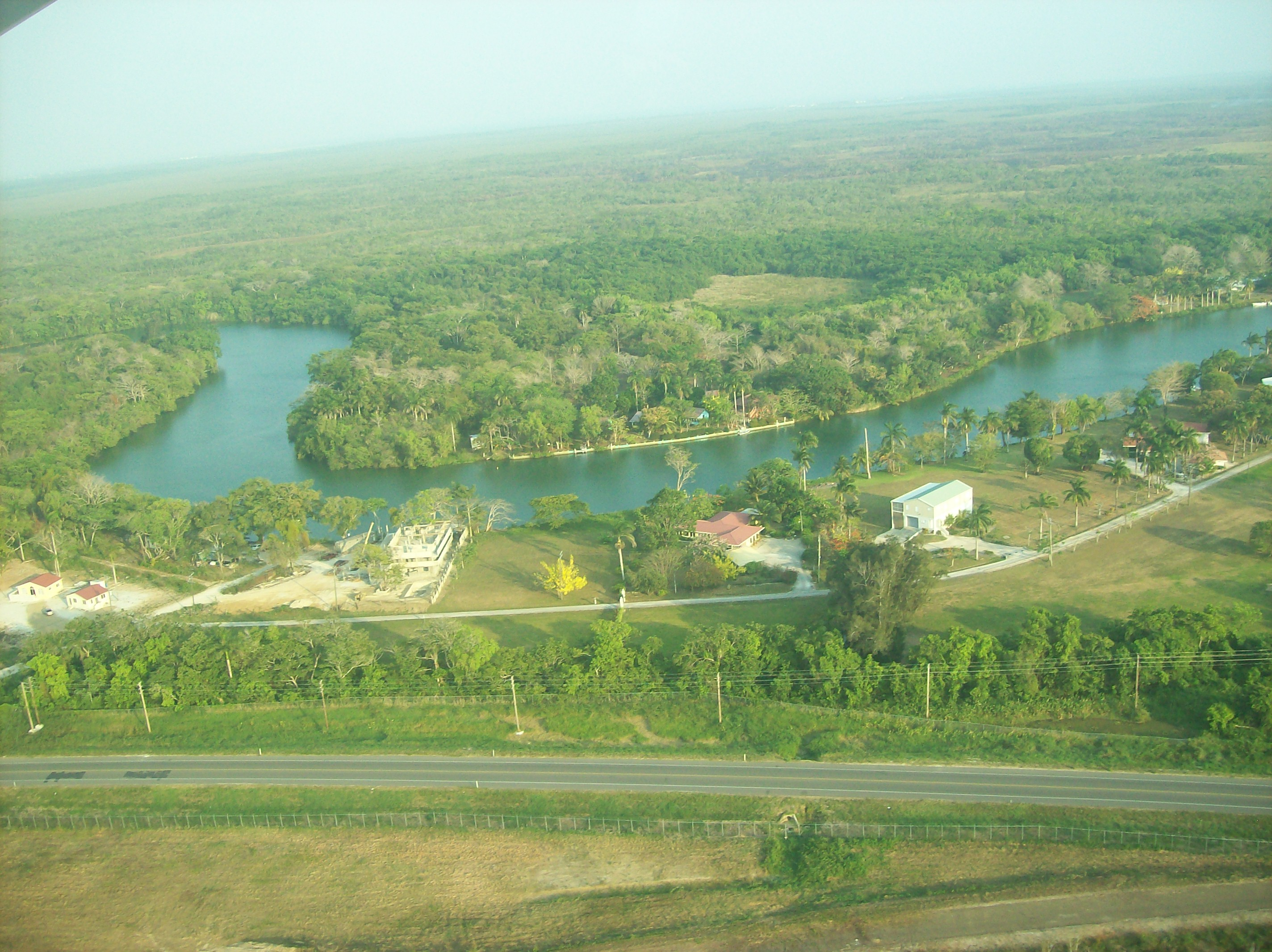
Residences near the river

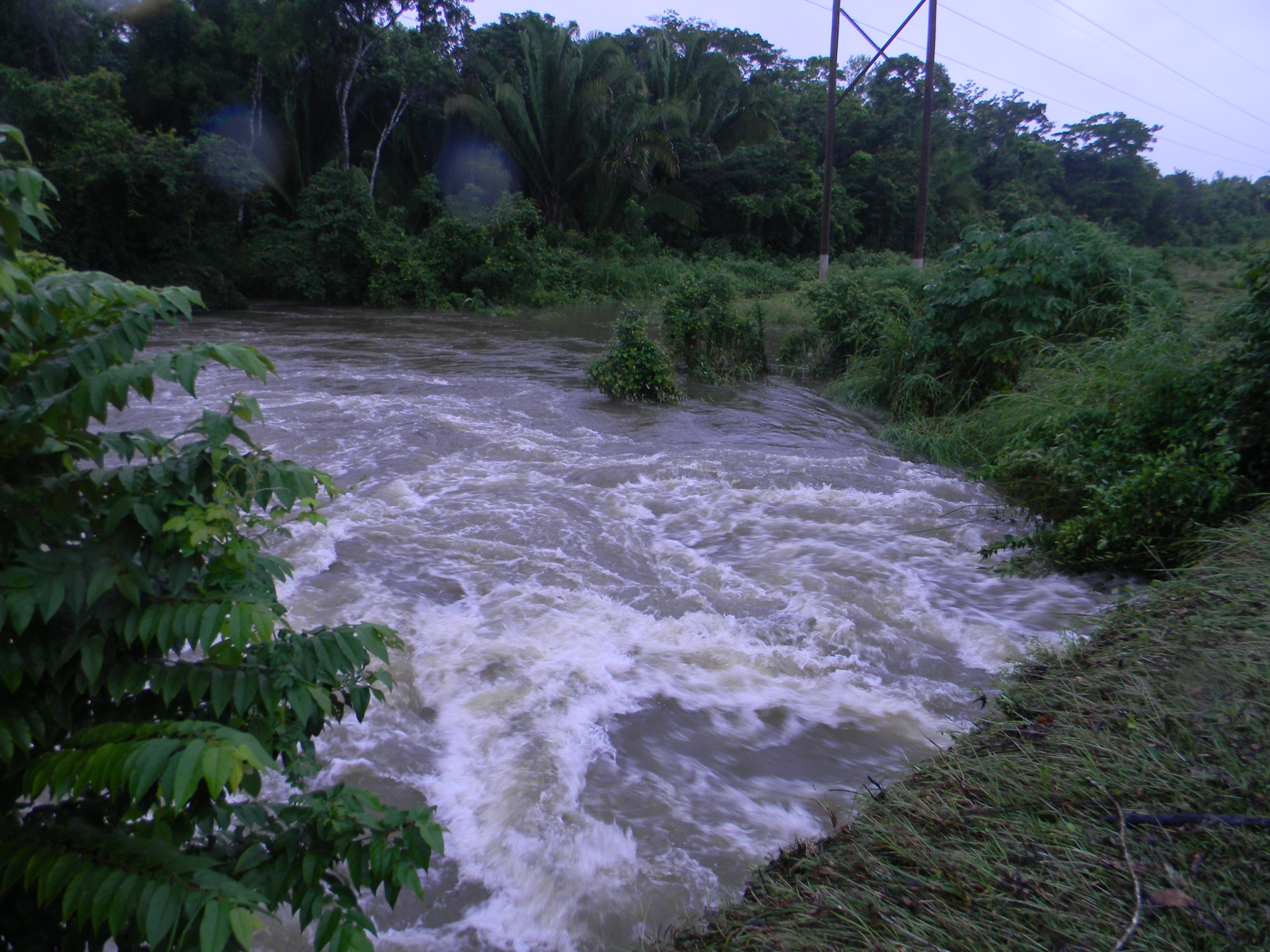
At flood stage in 2002
