= Districts of Belize =

Belize is divided into six districts: Belize, Cayo, Corozal, Orange Walk, Stann Creek and Toledo.

== List ==
Districts of Belize

District	Capital	Area	Population (2022)	Population (2010)	Change	Population density (2019)
Belize	Belize City	4,310 km^{2} (1,663 sq mi)	113,630	95,287	+19.3%	28.8/km^{2} (74.6/sq mi)
Cayo	San Ignacio	5,200 km^{2} (2,006 sq mi)	99,105	75,034	+32.1%	19.1/km^{2} (49.4/sq mi)
Corozal	Corozal Town	1,860 km^{2} (718 sq mi)	45,310	41,060	+10.4%	24.4/km^{2} (63.1/sq mi)
Orange Walk	Orange Walk Town	4,600 km^{2} (1,790 sq mi)	54,152	45,936	+17.9%	11.3/km^{2} (29.4/sq mi)
Stann Creek	Dangriga	2,550 km^{2} (986 sq mi)	48,162	34,324	+40.3%	18.9/km^{2} (48.8/sq mi)
Toledo	Punta Gorda	4,410 km^{2} (1,704 sq mi)	37,124	30,783	+20.6%	8.4/km^{2} (21.8/sq mi)

Ethnicity	Corozal	Orange Walk	Belize	Cayo	Stann Creek	Toledo	2010	2000
Total	39,539	44,804	87,523	70,157	31,514	29,885	303,422	232,111
Asian	266	344	1,220	648	265	80	2,823	1,716
Black/African	65	41	729	199	79	38	1,151	582
Caucasian/White	341	98	1,156	787	476	241	3,099	1,758
Creole	2,151	2,402	42,107	10,247	5,128	1,022	63,057	57,859
East Indian	1,142	159	2,041	806	917	1,421	6,486	6,868
Garifuna	235	262	3,578	975	7,518	1,417	13,985	14,061
Hindu	106	76	320	50	28	7	587	n.a
Lebanese	52	0	146	39	3	0	240	n.a
Maya ‐ Ketchi	68	72	837	1,408	1,333	13,691	17,409	12,366
Maya ‐ Mopan	84	237	627	1,936	3,166	4,507	10,557	8,980
Maya ‐ Yucatec	289	164	166	1,469	29	24	2,141	3,155
Mennonite	2,566	4,852	353	2,809	46	239	10,865	8,276
Mestizo/Spanish/Latino	30,061	34,616	26,974	44,445	9,501	5,324	150,921	113,045
Other	30	40	356	164	132	40	762	2,610
Mixed ethnicity	1,893	1,355	6,835	4,145	2,885	1,834	18,947	n.a.
Don't know/not stated	190	86	78	30	8	0	392	835

== See also ==
- Constituencies of Belize
- List of municipalities in Belize
- List of West Indian first-level country subdivisions
- ISO 3166-2:BZ
- Commonwealth Local Government Forum-Americas
