= List of killings by law enforcement officers in Belize =

This is a list of people reported killed by military and non-military law enforcement officers in Belize since the 2000s, whether in the line of duty or not, and regardless of reason or method. The listing documents the occurrence of a death, making no implications regarding wrongdoing or justification on the part of the person killed or officer involved. Killings are arranged by date of the incident that caused death. Different death dates, if known, are noted in the description or footnotes. The tables below list 66 people as of July 2025. (Note: In Belize, military officers sometimes act in a domestic law enforcement capacity. Complete lists of killings by law enforcement officers in Belize are not officially published, so this article relies on media and unofficial reports. Notes and short citations provided in Nb columns. Short citations in the form A yy refer to Amnesty International, yyyy report, sec Belize. Short citations in the form S yy refer to US State Department, report for yyyy, sec Belize. Short citations in the form Am yy refer to Amandala, review for yyyy (or for split reviews, Am yyi refer to the first part of the review, Am yyii refer to second part, and so on).)

== 2020s ==
Date	Name (age)	District (place)	Description	Ruling	Nb
30 Jun 2025	Kevin de Paz (19)	Belize (Caye Caulker)	De Paz was stabbed and killed during a late night brawl on Luciano Reyes Street involving two off-duty police constables. The officers alleged they acted in self-defence, but family were not convinced.	Two constables suspended; investigative outcome not clear	
25 Mar 2023	Dyandre Chee (19)	Orange Walk (Orange Walk)	Police corporal Esmin Flores and police constable Salomen Cowo shot and killed Chee when he fled from arrest on a motorcycle on Boundary Road. Officers claimed they shot at Chee and a companion after hearing gunshots from the motorcycle. Chee's companion told police the sound officers heard was from the motorcycle engine, and further claimed officers used threats and intimidation to pressure him to recant his testimony.	Flores and Cowo arrested and charged; trial outcome not clear	(Note: S 23; "OW Teen Killed by Cops". Amandala. Belize. 29 March 2023. Surnamed Chi in S 23.)
31 Dec 2022	David Ramnarace, Jon Ramnarace, Vivian Ramnarace	Cayo (Belmopan)	Police corporal Elmer Nah allegedly shot and killed three members of the Ramnarace family as they celebrated New Year's Eve in their residence.	Nah charged; trial outcome not clear	(Note: Am 23i; Am 24i; Amandala 2025ad. Plus Yemi Alberto shot and wounded (Amandala 2025ad).)
20 Dec 2022	Andrew McDougal (25)	Stann Creek (Santa Cruz)	McDougal, a haemophiliac being arrested for public use of cannabis, was beaten and slammed against a police vehicle after being handcuffed by police officers John Lucas and Jameel Lewis, as per mobile phone footage. McDougal died two weeks later on 20 December of internal bleeding due to the beatings, per the autopsy report.	Lucas and Lewis suspended and charged; trial outcome not clear	(Note: S 23; "Hemophiliac, 25, Dies Two Weeks After Police Beating". Amandala. Belize. 24 December 2022. A third police officer, Tessa Stuart, was charged with perverting the course of justice due to false testimony and likewise suspended (S 23).)
14 Aug 2022	Derrick Uh (20)	Corozal (Corozal)	Uh was detained by police constable Errol Peralta for disorderly conduct and alleged sexual assault on 14 August in San Joaquin, Corozal. He was placed in a sealed prisoner van and later transported to the Corozal Police Station but was not removed from the vehicle until 13 hours later, when a police officer found his lifeless body. A postmortem determined Uh died due to heat stroke as a consequence of prolonged confinement in an enclosed space.	Two officers suspended and charged; trial outcome not clear	(Note: S 23; S 22; "Four Officers Arraigned for Derrick Uh's Death". Amandala. Belize. 20 August 2022.; Amandala 2023l. Four officers (inspector Isaias Sanchez, sergeant Rosario Romero, constable Errol Peralta, constable Alrick Borland) originally charged with manslaughter, but charges against Sanchez and Romero dropped in June 2023 (S 23; S 22; Amandala 2023l). Family settled a wrongful death suit in August 2023 (S 23).)
5 Sep 2021	Jesse Escobar (29)	Cayo (Santa Familia)	BDF private Raheem Valencio shot and killed Escobar in an altercation with a joint police-BDF patrol (with police officer Juan Morales and BDF soldier Ramon Alcoser) that had stopped a group of men at Branch Mouth Stop & Shop, a convenience store. The altercation allegedly started when the patrol directed a groupmember to wear a COVID-19 face mask properly. Surveillance footage showed Valencia brandishing his service M4 carbine at an unarmed Escobar after some heated words.	Valencio detained and charged; trial outcome not clear	(Note: S 21; "Year in Review 2021 – Part 3". Amandala. Belize. 15 January 2022.; "Off-Duty BDF Killed by Fellow Soldier". Amandala. Belize. 8 September 2021. Morales charged with aggravated assault and false testimony, and with further disciplinary charges for a police tribunal (S 21). Alcoser charged with false testimony (S 21). Named Jessie in S 21.)
14 Jul 2021	Laddie Gillett (14)	Stann Creek (Placencia)	Gillett was shot and killed by police officer Kareem Martinez as the latter chased Gillett and another young person while responding to a call regarding a burglary in progress.	Martinez convicted, 18 years' prison	(Note: S 23; S 21; Am 23i; Lopez 2021, p. 5.)
13 Oct 2020	Akeem Tillett (33–34)	Belize (Coastal Rd)	Tillett, who had escaped prison on 12 October, was shot and killed during a firefight with police officers who were on the lookout for escapees. Tillett was allegedly armed with a stolen assault rifle.	?	
19 Apr 2020	Ulysease Roca (25)	Belize (Willows Bank)	Roca was found dead on 19 April, two weeks after he was beaten by a police officer while in police custody for allegedly breaking a COVID-19 curfew regulation. Roca alleged that police harassed and bullied and beat him for being gay. Roca's family believed an injury from said police beatings developed an infection which proved fatal.	?	(Note: S 20; Amandala 2020j; Human Rights Commission 2020; 7 News 2020a. Roca's family noted Roca was denied service by their local public health facility (S 20). UNIBAM claimed the cause of death was inconclusive, though the police claimed it was HIV/AIDS complications (S 20; 7 News 2020a). A police officer who recorded and published video of Roca's abuse was internally disciplined for 'an act of prejudice to good order and discipline,' though Roca had called for the video to be taken down (S 20; Amandala 2020j; 7 News 2020a). Named Ulysses Terry in Amandala 2020j. Named Ulysses Roca Terry and Ulysease Roca in Human Rights Commission 2020.)

== 2010s ==
Date	Name (age)	District (place)	Description	Ruling	Nb
16 Jul 2019	Allyson Major Jr (36)	Belize (Belize)	Police corporal Kent Martinez shot Major, a teacher, while in hot pursuit on Regent Street from a police vehicle after suspecting Major had purchased illegal drugs (cannabis). Major received a gunshot wound to the head and died while undergoing treatment.	Martinez acquitted	(Note: S 22; S 20; S 19; Lopez 2021, pp. 5, 13. Judge advised jury to return a not guilty verdict for lack of forensic evidence by prosecution (S 22). As of November 2022, Martinez awaited a police tribunal trial concerning five other disciplinary charges (S 22).)
Jun 2019	Nestor Vasquez	Belize (Belize)	Two police officers at the Queen Street Police Station failed to intervene when a mentally disabled detainee inflicted fatal head injuries on Vasquez, their mentally disabled cellmate.	Two officers dismissed	
22 Feb 2018	Ariel Salazar (46)	Orange Walk (Orange Walk)	Seven BDF soldiers and one police officer allegedly beat Salazar to death over a suspected mobile phone theft in his residence on San Antonio Road and Staines Alley. All but one of the soldiers or officer were allegedly masked.	Soldiers and officer charged; case dismissed	(Note: S 18; Amandala 2018k; 7 News 2018c. Case dismissed in September 2018 due to case file's being lost (S 18). The police officer was Lennart Cajun (Amandala 2018k). The seven soldiers were Francis Sho, Baldimir Escarraga, Patrick Francis Sr, Elvis Cobb, Patrick Vallagran, Elmer Petillo, Patrick Diego, and Mateo Bolon (Amandala 2018k). The soldiers and officer were further charged with the attempted murder of Oscar Peyres, who was also beaten with Salazar and Noe Sanchez (Amandala 2018k; 7 News 2018c).)
14 Jan 2018	Mario Vernon Jr (24)	Toledo (Punta Gorda)	A purportedly inebriated police constable, Tevin Aranda, allegedly shot and killed Vernon, grandson of Leela Vernon, in a neighbour's residence on George Price Street. Aranda claimed Vernon had a firearm in hand, but witnesses contradicted the constable's account.	Aranda suspended and charged; trial outcome not clear	(Note: S 18; "Leela Vernon's Grandson Shot Dead". Amandala. Belize. 17 January 2018.; "Policeman Arraigned on Manslaughter Charge for Killing Mario 'Jun Jun' Vernon". Amandala. Belize. 20 January 2018. Family compensated on AG's ruling incident an unlawful killing (S 18).)
15 Aug 2017	Dwayne Almendarez (30–31)	Orange Walk (Yo Creek)	Customs officer Rudolph Williams shot Almendarez in the chest, abdomen, and leg during an anti-smuggling customs-BDF bus search. Almendarez had reportedly charged at Williams when prompted to hand over his allegedly uncustomed goods. Almendarez's family claim he was unarmed. Almendarez died while in an induced coma on 19 August.	Williams charged; trial outcome not clear	
9 Jun 2017	Richard Garcia (44)	Corozal (Chunox)	Four police officers shot and killed Garcia after he allegedly approached the officers with a machete during a routine eviction. Neighbours rejected this account, describing Garcia as 'peaceful, humble and hardworking.'	Investigative outcome not clear	(Note: S 17; "'Rambo' Cops Kill Richard Garcia, 44". Amandala. Belize. 14 June 2017.; "When will Police Finalize Case of Richard Allen Garcia?". 7 News. Belize. 23 June 2017. Officers not suspended despite ongoing investigation (S 17).)
Mar 2017	unnamed man (30)	Belize (San Pedro)	Three police officers allegedly beat a man to death while in custody on disorderly conduct charges.	Officers charged; trial outcome not clear	
20 Apr 2016	Julio Alvarado Ruano (14)	Cayo (Chiquibul Forest)	Alvarado Ruano was shot and killed by forest rangers during a joint border patrol with soldiers.	Investigation clears rangers	(Note: S 16; Amandala 2016aa. The minor's father (Carlos Alvarado Ramirez, 48) and sibling (Carlos Alvarado Ruado, 12) 'received minor injuries' (Amandala 2016aa).)
7 Mar 2016	Edwin Ixpatac (30)	Belize (San Pedro)	Ixpatac, a bartender, was detained on 3 March on disorderly conduct charges. Despite being injured prior to arrest, police did not seek medical attention for Ixpatac. Video footage showed police constables Rommel Logan, Reydel Teck, and Jahisir Cobb beating Ixpatac that night. He was found unconscious the next morning, a post mortem revealing he had died on 7 March from a blow to the head received during his detention.	Logan, Tech, and Cobb convicted	(Note: S 22; S 16; "Three San Pedro Cops Remanded for Murder". Amandala. Belize. 12 March 2016.; "Belize". The Law on Police Use of Force. South Africa: University of Johannesburg. 2025. Convicted for murder on 3 October 2022 (S 22). Police Department admitted administrative neglect by station's commanding officer (S 16).)
8 Jun 2015	Hilberto Sotz (18)	Belize (Caye Caulker)	Sotz was fatally brutalised while in custody by police officers Leonard Nunez and Hallet King. Sotz had been detained pending the investigation of a series of burglaries. According to an alleged witness, Nunez and King tortured Sotz and put a plastic bag over his head. An autopsy concluded that Sotz died from major internal bleeding and trauma caused by excessive force.	Nunez and King convicted, 9 months' prison	(Note: S 19; S 15; "2 Caye Caulker Cops Charged with Murder". Amandala. Belize. 12 June 2015. Misdated July 2015 in S 15.)
15 Dec 2014	Peter Castillo Jr (21)	Belize (Bacalar Chico)	Castillo, an alleged playador (person combing beach for washed up cocaine parcels), was killed during a shootout with coast guard officers who were patrolling the park. The officers claimed they were returning fire.	Investigative outcome not clear	
29 Mar 2014	Tomas Desdicho Ramirez (29)	Cayo (Chiquibul Forest)	BDF soldiers fatally injured Desdicho Ramirez, a campesino (farmer) of San Marcos, Peten, during a routine border patrol with police and forest rangers. The patrol came across a group of allegedly armed Guatemalan civilians illicitly farming in the protected park. When ordered to surrender themselves, the men allegedly opened fire on the patrol.	Investigative outcome not clear	
24 Feb 2014	Moses Williams (25)	Toledo (Big Falls)	A special constable and a regular constable shot Williams while trying to subdue him after he injured one of the officers with a machete. The special constable was hospitalised, while Williams later died from the shooting. Williams's family filed complaints against the constables, arguing they mishandled the incident, in part because Williams suffered from a mental disorder.	Internal investigation clears constables	(Note: S 14; "Mentally Challenged Man, Shot in the Leg, Dies of the Injury". Amandala. Belize. 25 February 2014. Internal investigation found no intention to injure or kill Williams, and determined police used justifiable force (S 14).)
19 Apr 2013	Ryan Lozano (21)	Belize (Ladyville)	Police shot Lozano while responding to a burglary in progress on 18 April. Police alleged the victim exited the home wielding a knife and crowbar and advanced towards them before one officer shot him once in the abdomen. The victim's family alleged that police shot him three times in the back while he was on the ground in police custody. Lozano succumbed to his injuries on 19 April.	Investigative outcome not clear	
5 Oct 2012	Francisco Quin Yat (37)	Cayo (Chiquibul Forest)	A BDF soldier on border patrol shot and killed Quin Yat, a campesino (farmer) of Monte los Olivos, Peten, allegedly after the machete-wielding farmer kept advancing on the soldier despite warning shots.	?	
18 Jul 2012	Luis Martinez Alonzo	Toledo (Columbia Forest)	BDF soldiers on border patrol shot and killed Martinez Alonzo, a Guatemalan national, upon discovering an illegal logging operation in the forest reserve.	Investigative outcome not clear	(Note: Amandala 2014t; "Reaction from Across the Border on Guatemalan Killed by B.D.F." News 5. Belize. 20 July 2012.; Amandala 2016z. Located in Cayo (Chiquibul Forest) by Amandala 2016z.)
7 Jul 2012	Kendal Flowers (18), Alexander Mazariegos (22), Alley Garcia (23)	Belize (Bacalar Chico)	Flowers, Mazariegos, and Garcia were killed during a firefight with coast guard officers and BDF soldiers. The joint patrol had been sweeping the border park after reports of organised criminal activity in the area.	Investigative outcome not clear	
22 Apr 2012	Arthur Young	Belize (Belize)	Young was shot and killed when a firearm went off during a struggle with a police officer, who police claim was trying to frustrate an escape attempt by Young.	None	(Note: S 12; Amandala 2012v. S 12 call Young a 'notorious gang leader.' Amandala 2012v name him 'reputed leader of the Taylor's Alley Gang.')
28 Jan 2012	Juan Choc Chub (29)	Cayo (Chiquibul Forest)	BDF soldiers on border patrol shot and killed Choc Chub, a Guatemalan national, allegedly for poaching in the forest reserve.	?	(Note: Amandala 2014t; "Bze Security Forces Kill Guatemalan: MFA Says he was in Belize". 7 News. Belize. 1 February 2012.; "Flashpoint at Chiquibul". Amandala. Belize. 2 February 2012.; Amandala 2016z. Misdated February 2012 in Amandala 2014t. Surnamed Chioc Chub in Amandala 2016z.)
10 May 2010	Alex Goff (31)	Belize (Caye Caulker)	Police constable Alpheus Parham allegedly shot and killed Goff while in custody after being arrested at the Lazy Lizard, a bar, for disorderly conduct and assaulting a police officer.	Parham charged; trial outcome not clear	
27 Feb 2010	Teddy Murillo (21)	Belize (Belize)	Murillo, a UB student and Adventist deacon, was shot and killed while biking home on Waight Street by an unknown suspect in a moving vehicle. Murillo reportedly had been involved in an altercation with a police officer earlier the same evening, and the family alleged that said police officer had committed the killing.	Investigative outcome not clear	(Note: S 10; "Family of Murdered Deacon Accuses Police of Murder". 7 News. Belize. 1 March 2010. Misdated March 2010 in S 10.)
13 Feb 2010	Anthony Jones (41)	Belize (Lords Bank)	Police corporal Jorge Lemus shot and killed Jones, a Jamaican national, as he rode away from a fight outside Ruba's Bar. Eyewitnesses alleged the victim posed no threat to Lemus and police constable Lazaro Catch, but the officers claimed he carried a shiny object the corporal mistook for a gun.	Lemus and Catch charged; trial outcome not clear	(Note: S 10; "Jamaican Shot to Death by Police". Amandala. Belize. 16 February 2010.; "Officers Charged for the Death of Jamaican National". News 5. Belize. 11 May 2010. A constable was further charged with abetment to commit manslaughter (S 10). Mislocated in Ladyville, Belize, in S 10.)

== 2000s ==
Date	Name (age)	District (place)	Description	Ruling	Nb
2009	unnamed man	Orange Walk (?)	A reportedly inebriated man was shot in the leg by a joint patrol of police officers and soldiers, allegedly for resisting arrest despite warning shots. The man later succumbed to his injury in hospital.	Officers charged; trial outcome not clear	(Note: S 10. BDF suggested death was due to negligent medical care (S 10).)
22 Dec 2009	Christopher Galvez (23)	Belize (Belize)	Galvez was fatally shot in the head by an unknown suspect in the Pipersburgh Boatyard. Galvez's family alleged a police officer killed Galvez.	Inquiry clears police	(Note: S 10; "Execution of Chris Galvez". 7 News. Belize. 23 December 2009. Galvez's family reported police harassment and threats, but inquiry found no evidence of professional misconduct, despite reporting irregularities and breaches of standing orders (S 10).)
Aug 2009	unnamed boy (17)	Belize (Belize)	A 17 year old boy was allegedly beaten to death by police officers while in custody on charges of robbery. Witnesses claimed the boy was last seen with the officers in a police vehicle before his body was found.	None	
11 Jun 2009	Onario Oba (19)	Orange Walk (Douglas)	Customs officer Charles Flores allegedly shot and killed Oba in the face during a confrontation between a routine anti-smuggling patrol and a group of alleged smugglers from San Victor, Corozal. The joint police-customs-BDF patrol had earlier seized $10,000 worth of uncustomed goods in San Victor. Officers alleged they fired warning shots as the group were armed with machetes, sticks, and stones, but Oba's father stated his son had been an innocent bystander.	Flores charged; trial outcome not clear	
Mar 2009	unnamed man (20)	Belize (Belize)	A man was shot and killed by a police officer during an alleged robbery attempt. Witnesses claimed the officer stood over him and shot him in the face.	None	
2 Feb 2009	Atanacio Gutierrez (44)	Orange Walk (Tower Hill)	Gutierrez, a cane farmer, was shot and killed by police during a labour protest.	Investigative outcome not clear	
3 Aug 2008	Carmen Herrera (49)	Belize (Belize)	Herrera was shot (in the back of the head) and killed on Swing Bridge by a police constable in pursuit. The officer claimed Herrera had been armed, but family and witnesses contradicted this.	Constable acquitted	(Note: S 08; S 10; 7 News 2008p; "No Case to Answer for Cop Richard Polonio, Accused in 2008 Shooting Death of Carmen Alexander Herrera". Amandala. Belize. 26 February 2010. Court instructed jury to find constable not guilty following successful no case motion by defence (S 10). Named Alex in 7 News 2008p.)
1 Nov 2007	Jimmy Montano Gutierrez (26)	Belize (San Pedro)	Montano Gutierrez was shot and killed on Seaweed Street in San Juan by police officers, who claimed he had aimed a gun at them. Neighbours contradicted this account, saying Montano Guitierrez held a beer bottle, not a gun.	Investigative outcome not clear	(Note: S 08; "Another Controversial, Fatal Shooting by Police on San Pedro". Amandala. Belize. 2 November 2007. Misdated October 2007 in S 08.)
16 Aug 2005	Andrew Wallace (13)	Belize (Belize)	Wallace was shot and killed on East Collet Canal by police constable Randy Sanchez, who claimed the former had been armed.	Investigation clears Sanchez	
12 Feb 2005	Leslie Rogers Jr (21)	Belize (Belize)	Rogers, a St John's sixth former, was shot in the head and killed on Amara Avenue by police constable Aldo Ayuso.	Ayuso acquitted	
12 Feb 2004	Leroy Pilgrim	Belize (San Pedro)	Pilgrim was shot and killed by police constable Burton Caliz during a search of Pilgrim's boat. Caliz claimed a struggle over an unlicensed firearm led to the shooting, but no evidence was found for said claim.	Caliz convicted	
29 Sep 2003	Frederick Espinoza	Toledo (Punta Negra)	Police were called to Espinoza's residence after an altercation with his uncle, and reportedly found him armed with a machete. Witnesses reported that officers flung stones at Espinoza and then fatally shot him four times as he tried to flee. Espinoza was believed to have been suffering from a mental illness.	?	(Note: A 04; News 5 2003d. Surnamed Espinosa in News 5 2003d.)
10 Sep 2003	Aaron Mariano	Belize (Belize)	Mariano was shot and killed by BDF private Giovanni Gutierrez while on a routine patrol with police (including constable Dennis Palacio). Press reported Mariano was unarmed and fleeing (as the patrol tried to detain him) when Gutierrez shot him in the back of the head.	Gutierrez and Palacio convicted; overturned on appeal; case dropped	(Note: S 03; S 05; S 06. There were reports that Gutierrez had acted under orders (S 03). Gutierrez and police constable Dennis Palacio convicted 18 May 2005, but both appealed; appeals court overturned convictions in March 2006, ordering retrial; family accepted $5,000 compensation to close case (S 05; S 06). Misdated 2002 in S 05, S 06.)
20 Aug 2003	Mark Stuart	Belize (Hattieville)	Stuart was shot and killed by corrections officers at Central Prison, allegedly upon attacking an officer with a knife and refusing to back down despite a warning shot fired into his leg. Media reported Stuart was shot 49 times.	Investigative outcome unclear	(Note: S 03. Led to guards swapping weapons for stun guns and pepper spray (S 03).)
17 Jun 2003	Kirk Belisle	Belize (Hattieville)	Belisle (a burglarly convict) was stabbed and killed by convicted murder Phillip Tillett, who had 'walked past security and left the maximum-security section' of Central Prison to do so. Corrections officers denied seeing the stabbing.	?	(Note: S 03. Tillett was charged with murder (S 03).)
14 Jun 2003	Darnell McDonald (28)	Belize (Ladyville)	McDonald was shot in the neck and killed by police constable Sherwood Wade when police officers fired into a crowd outside Celina's Nightclub. Officers alleged the crowd fired on them as they tried to detain McDonald.	Wade convicted, $15,000 fine	(Note: A 04; S 03; S 05; Lopez 2021, p. 5. Plus two crowd members shot and injured (S 03). The 20 July 2005 sentencing ($4,000 fine) appealed by DPP for being unduly lenient; appeals court sentenced Wade in June 2006 to $15,000 fine or nine months' prison in case of default (S 05; S 06). Dated 16 June in Lopez 2021, p. 5.)
7 Jun 2003	Ruben Alarcon	Belize (Caye Caulker)	An unarmed Alarcon, who had come to the station seeking the release of two friends, was shot in the back of the head at close range by police constable Sheldon Arzu. When he fell, Alarcon was reportedly again shot at close range.	Arzu convicted, 13 years' prison	(Note: A 04; S 03; S 05; Lopez 2021, p. 5; 7 News 2010j; "Constable Gets 13 Years for Killing 'Pony' Alarcon". 7 News. Belize. 6 December 2005. Named Reuben in S 05.)
30 Dec 2002	Albert Pennil	Belize (Belize)	Pennil was shot and killed outside a restaurant, with police constable Kevin Alvarez and his two brothers arrested on suspicion of murder.	Alvarez charged; charges dropped	(Note: S 02; S 03; S 04. Alvarez had been dismissed in November 2001 (for a number of complaints, including 'his alleged involvement in a lethal shooting and a beheading,' but rehired in early 2002 (S 02).)
27 Sep 2002	Alfredo Chen, Seriano Choc	Toledo (Otoxha)	Chen and Choc were shot and killed in a confrontation with two police officers, while the latter (with two forestry officers) tried to confiscate illegally logged mahogany. The machete-wielding villagers allegedly formed a mob of 30 which advanced on the officers.	Inquiry clears officers	(Note: A 03; S 02; S 03. Plus three villagers shot and wounded (A 03). Family compensated by end 2002 (S 02). Dated October 2002 in A 03. Surnamed Alfredo Teck in S 03.)
6 Jul 2002	Gian Godoy (22)	Belize (Hattieville)	Godoy, a diabetic inmate in Central Prison, died of diabetes-related complications. The lack of a duty nurse on weekends is thought to have contributed to the death.	?	
9 Jan 2002	Kirk Thompson (22), Edmund Velasquez	Belize (Maskall)	The bodies of Thompson and Velasquez were found in Northern River on 9 January. An autopsy found they had died of drowning, with no sign of foul play. Their family were convinced police had killed them, and several members of the Police Department had told press 'the two men would never be taken alive.'	Investigative outcome not clear	(Note: S 02; S 03; "Thompson Dead, Questions Abound". News 5. Belize. 10 January 2002. Thompson and Velasquez were suspected of murdering a police officer, a security guard, and a businessman, and injuring another police officer (S 02).)
22 Nov 2001	Jesus Ramirez Solano (61), Jesus Ramirez Icho, Virgilio Ramirez Icho	Toledo (San Vicente)	A Guatemalan farmer (Ramirez Solano) and his two sons were shot and killed by soldiers during a BDF-police border patrol. Soldiers alleged the father approached with a machete and did not stop when ordered.	Investigative findings differed; inquiry clears officers	(Note: A 03; S 01; ; Amandala 2016z. December 2001 OAS mission found the killings unlawful, but 2002 Belizean commission of inquiry found officers had acted in self-defence (A 03). On 18 December 2001, the OAS mission recommended families be compensated and joint patrol members be suspended 'pending a judicial investigation to determine culpability' (S 01). Family offered $96,000 in ex gratia payments in May 2002 (A 03; Amandala 2016z).)
Oct 2001	George Hyde	Cayo (Benque Viejo)	Hyde, whom police apparently suspected of drug dealing, was shot and killed by police officers after he refused to stop at a police checkpoint at the town's entrance. Officers claimed Hyde had fired at them first. Hyde's family contested this, noting Hyde had bruises on his face, and noting there were no bullet holes in his car, nor blood in the front seat.	Investigation clears officers	
31 Aug 2001	Frederick Reynolds (18)	Belize (Crooked Tree)	Police constable Marvin Vernon shot and killed Reynolds, apparently as revenge for testimony against Vernon in a police brutality case on 13 August. The constable claimed their gun went off accidentally, but a witness already in custody stated that he saw Vernon throw Reynolds into a police vehicle, beat him, pull out their service pistol, and shoot Reynolds in the chest.	Vernon convicted, $5,000 fine and 9 months' prison	(Note: A 02; S 02; S 03; News 5 2001e. Statements forwarded to DPP by end of 2001 (A 02). Named Fredrick in News 5 2001e.)
19 Aug 2000	Leslie Smith	Belize (Belize)	Smith was reportedly killed by two police officers while they attempted to arrest him on East Collet Canal. The officers claimed Smith was armed with a knife, but witnesses apparently contested this.	Investigative outcome not clear	(Note: A 01; News 5 2000f. Named Les in News 5 2000f.)
17 Mar 2000	Cecil Ramirez	Belize (Hattieville)	An inmate was shot and killed by a corrections officer during a prison riot of some 300–400 inmates (protesting 16 March floggings) at Central Prison.	Inquest outcome not clear	(Note: A 01; S 00; S 02. Plus three inmates shot and injured (A 01). Ombudsman found officer delinquent, but parliamentary committee and DPP could not, though latter forwarded case to coroner's inquest (S 01). Inquest delayed after September 2002 courthouse fire destroyed files (S 02).)
24 Feb 2000	Kelvin Barrow (24)	Belize (Belize)	Barrow drowned after being chased into the sea off Port Loyola by a machete-wielding off-duty police officer.	Inquest outcome not clear	(Note: S 00; "Drowning in Port Loyola". News 5. Belize. 24 February 2000. Ombudsman and DPP found no evidence for charges, but latter referred case to coroner's inquest; family sued in civil court (S 01). Inquest delayed after September 2002 courthouse fire destroyed files (S 02).)
24 Jan 2000	Samuel Ramirez	Cayo (Chiquibul Forest)	Ramirez, a Guatemalan farmer, was shot and killed by six soldiers near the border, purportedly after attacking the soldiers.	Inquiry clears soldiers	

== See also ==
- Crooks Report – 2008 paper on policing in Belize
- List of cases of police brutality in Belize
- Lists of killings by law enforcement officers – country lists

== Notes and references ==
=== References ===
1. "Gay Man Dies, Family Says Police Abuse Played a Role". 7 News. Belize. 20 April 2020.
2. "Eight Lawmen Arraigned for Murder". 7 News. Belize. 26 February 2018.
3. "A Cop Kills on Caye Caulker". 7 News. Belize. 10 May 2010.
4. "Police Use Deadly Force on Alex Herrera; His Family Says 'Unjustified!'". 7 News. Belize. 4 August 2008.
5. "Onario Oba, 19, Dies; Innocent Bystander, Says Dad". Amandala. Belize. 16 June 2009.
6. "Ulysses Terry Found Dead in Willows Bank". Amandala. Belize. 22 April 2020.
7. "7 BDF Soldiers and a Cop Arraigned on Murder and Attempted Murder Charges". Amandala. Belize. 28 February 2018.
8. "2 Cops Charged for Derrick Uh's Death Go Free". Amandala. Belize. 5 July 2023.
9. "Guat Farmer Shot Dead in Chiquibul". Amandala. Belize. 1 April 2014.
10. "City's 2 Top Dons Shot Dead in 48 Hours". Amandala. Belize. 24 April 2012.
11. "Armed Attacks Upon BDF Led to 10 Fatal Shootings of Guatemalans: Commander David Jones". Amandala. Belize. 30 April 2016.
12. "Guatemalan Minor Killed in Crossfire, but not by BDF: OAS Report". Amandala. Belize. 27 August 2016.
13. "Elmer Nah Triple-Murder Case Begins". Amandala. Belize. 20 April 2025.
14. "Year in review". Amandala. Belize City. 2004–2024.
15. "Cop Shoots Machete Man in Punta Negra". News 5. Belize. 29 September 2003.
16. "Crooked Tree Teen Shot Dead by Police". News 5. Belize. 3 September 2001.
17. "Suspect Killed After Police Chase". News 5. Belize. 21 August 2000.
18. Amnesty International Report. Amnesty International (Annual NGO report). 1962–2025.
19. "The Human Rights Commission of Belize is Deeply Disturbed by the Events that Transpired in Police Detention Prior to the Passing of Ulysses Roca Terry". Human Rights Commission (Press release). Belize. 27 April 2020.
20. Lopez M (20 July 2021). "Child Victim – Individual or Systemic Flaw?". Amandala. No. 3475. Belize. pp. 5, 13.
21. Pham D, Pham G, Pham P, Sikkink K, Thoms OT, Vinck P (30 April 2024). "Belize". TJET Database of Transitional Justice Mechanisms, 1970–2020 (Scholarly database). Toronto.
22. Country Reports on Human Rights Practices. US Department of State (Annual statutory report). 1977–2025. HathiTrust 000062477. This article incorporates text from this source, which is in the public domain.
