= 2020 Belize prison escape =

Prison escape in Belize

Coordinates: 17.47696°N 88.40946°W

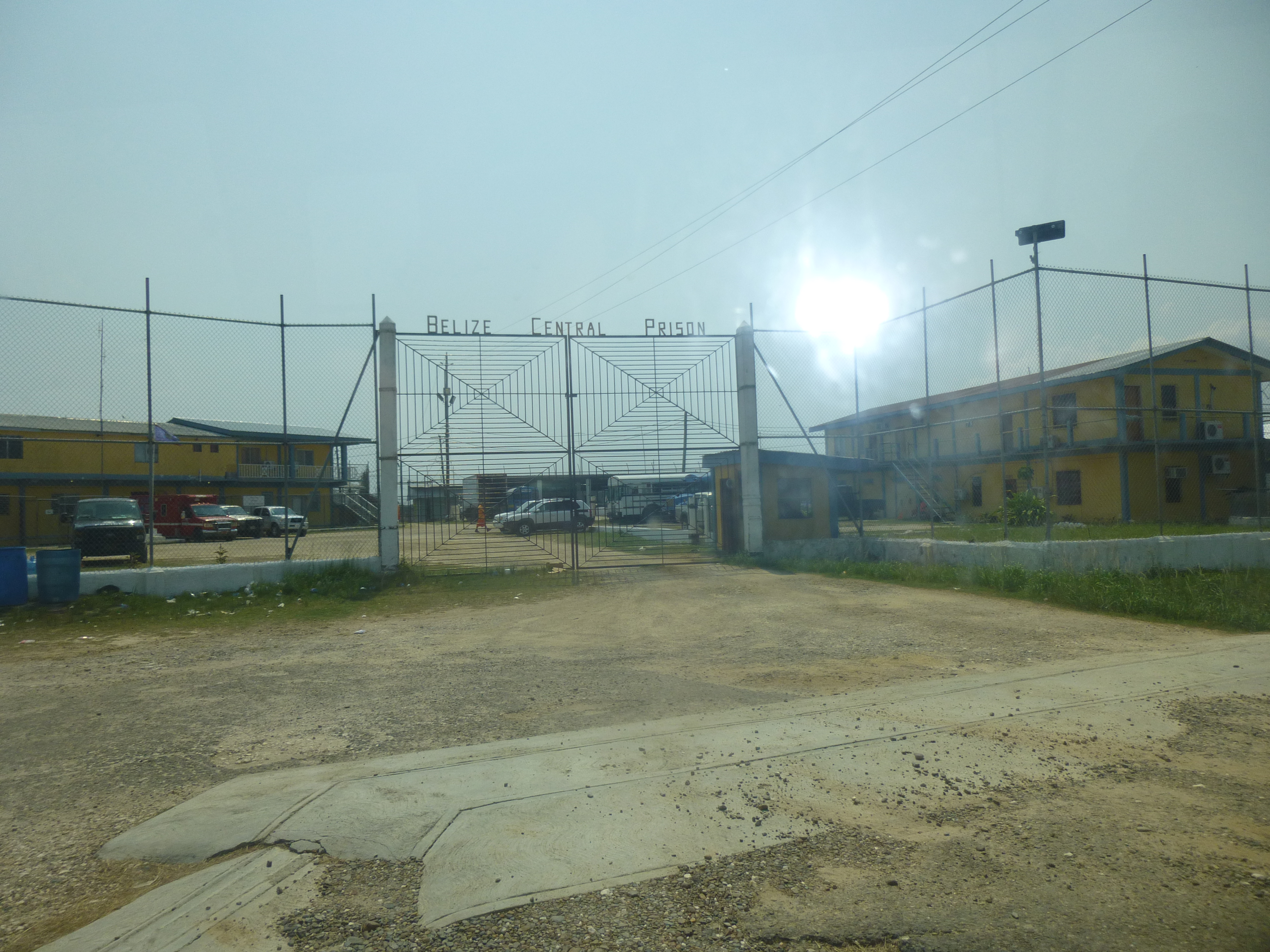
- Central Prison front gate
- Date: 12 October 2020
- Time: ca 6:00 pm local time
- Location: Central Prison, Hattieville, Belize
- Type: Prison escape
- Perpetrator: 28 inmates
- Outcome: 27 escapees reapprehended; 1 escapee killed
- Deaths: 1 (escapee)
- Injuries: Not reported

On 12 October 2020, 28 inmates from Central Prison in Hattieville, Belize, escaped solitary confinement by running to and breaching the prison fence with three guards as hostages or human shields. An over three-month manhunt for the escapees resulted in the reapprehension of 27, with one (Akeem Tillett) fatally shot during their attempted capture. The prison break is deemed the largest such in the country's history.

== Background ==
Central Prison managed to keep free of COVID-19 until 28 September, when it was first detected in a guard from Orange Walk. Contact tracing revealed 'several' other positive cases though, leading to a 'massive outbreak' in the prison, with 90 inmates testing positive on 28 October. In anticipation of said outbreak, the prison was reportedly set to go on a 21-day COVID-19 lockdown on 13 October. (Note: Loop News 2020a, para 5; Amandala 2020a, para 8.)

== Escape ==
On 12 October, at approximately 1:00 pm local time, a group of some five inmates in the solitary confinement section of Central Prison surreptitiously snuck up on and physically overpowered three guards in the nearest watchtower. (Note: Murillo 2021a, pp. 4, 7; Loop News 2020a, para 6-8.) The inmates commandeered an M4 carbine rifle and held the guards hostage for some five hours (as they waited for sunset to make their escape), all without attracting the attention of other prison guards nor administrators. At approximately 6:00 pm local time, the hostage takers (with their hostages) made for the nearest perimeter fence, this time garnering the attention of nearby guards and inmates. A guard was forced to advise other towers over radio 'not to shoot as they were being held hostage.' Despite this, the group came under fire from the Alpha 2 Tower, but this was to no avail as all hostage takers, and an additional number of inmates in the solitary confinement section, managed to breach the prison perimeter past the towers' shooting ranges, resulting in 28 escapees.

== Aftermath ==
Police and prison guards began a manhunt for the escapees within minutes of their escape, with the police commissioner advising the public 'to be extremely vigilant and careful when using the highways' as escaped inmates were 'armed and dangerous.' On 13 October, names and mugshots of all escapees were released, with an appeal for the public's help. (Note: Loop News 2020a, paras 1-2. Including two Guatemalan nationals, and at least 13 men charged or convicted of murder (Loop News 2020a, paras 3-4). The escapees were identified as Elroy Henry, Luis Paiz, Luke Bowen, Rudy Herrera, Mark Pelayo, Juan Ramirez, Akeem Tillett, Kevin Buller, Carlos Montejo, Deandre Guiffarro, Darren Vasquez, Christopher Bradley, Elser Oseguera, Enrique Martinez, Erwin Lanza, Eutychus Nunez, George Bednrick, Joel Sierra, Kendale Flores, Kenroy Gamboa, Micheal Faux, Orlando Smith, Oswaldo Perez, Phillip Bowen, Santos Lopez, Victor Galeano and White Deon (Loop News 2020a, paras 1-2). The Amandala identified Joel Sierra, Carlos Montejo, and Elser Oseguera as among the hostage takers (and escape masterminds) (Amandala 2020a, paras 2-3). The Central Prison warden named Carlos Montejo and Jose Guerra as the hostage-and-escape orchestrators, with Joel Sierra an enlisted accomplice (in "Prison CEO: Carlos Montejo and Jose Guerra were the Masterminds Behind the Prison Break". Breaking Belize News. Cayo. 13 October 2020. paras 1-2.).) That same day, armed police officers and soldiers engaged an escapee (Akeem Tillett, armed with the stolen rifle) in a shootout on Coastal Road, Belize, resulting in the latter's death. (Note: Murillo 2021a, p. 4; Amandala 2020a, para 6.) By 3 November, all but five (of 27 escapees still alive) had been reapprehended. By 31 January 2021, the last escapees still at large were taken into custody in Ladyville, Belize.

On 13 October, a group of some 15 to 25 inmates who had witnessed the prison break incited a riot during their morning recreation at circa 9:00 am local time near the Tango 7 Tower, purportedly to take advantage of increased media attention. The riot reportedly required physical force to be quelled, resulting in 'several' inmates being injured, and one fatally shot (Stephan Jenkins). (Note: Murillo 2021a, pp. 4–5; Murillo 2022b, p. 1; Amandala 2021e, para 1. At least one guard was gravely injured, and one sexually assaulted under threat of being gang raped, during the riot (Murillo 2021a, pp. 4–5, Murillo 2022b, p. 1).)

Investigations into the escape were separately conducted by the Police Department and Kolbe Foundation, with neither finding conclusive evidence of collusion between inmates and guards. Kolbe nonetheless found that officers in the solitary confinement section had acted negligently in placing the hostage takers in working positions (with some freedom of movement), despite their being in said section for prison rules violations or for being escape risks, and further found that the hostage takers acted out of fear of the 21-day COVID-19 lockdown scheduled for 13 October. (Note: Murillo 2021a, p. 7; Murillo 2022b, p. 1. COVID-19 lockdowns are thought to have disrupted inmates' access to cannabis and supplementary food routinely brought (or smuggled) in by visitors (Amandala 2021e, paras 9-12, Amandala 2021f, paras 4-6, 13-16). Prison-provided food rations, in particular, have been described as 'insufficient for a grown man' and 'inhumane' (Amandala 2021f, paras 5, 13-15).) The negligent officers were disciplined, and the prison 'ramped up security to prevent something of this magnitude from happening again,' including by building an additional watchtower for the solitary confinement section (inaugurated 26 March 2021). (Note: Murillo 2021a, pp. 7, 29; Murillo 2022b, pp. 2, 8, 30, 33; 7 News 2020a, para 2; "One Guard Dismissed; Two Others Suspended over Prison Escape". Amandala. Belize. 2 December 2020. paras 1–3.; Amandala 2021e, paras 2-6; Amandala 2021f, paras 7-8.)

The mass escape has been deemed the largest such in the country's history. (Note: Amandala 2020a, paras 1, 5; Amandala 2020b, para 11; 7 News 2020a, para 1; Amandala 2021e, para 1. And the first mass escape since Kolbe took over Central Prison (Murillo 2022b, p. 1).)

== See also ==
- Impact of the COVID-19 pandemic on prisons – including some prison breaks and riots
- List of prison escapes – historic or infamous cases

== Notes and references ==
=== References ===
1. "Biggest Jailbreak in Belizean History!". Amandala. Belize. 15 October 2020.
2. "Prison CEO: Disciplinary Actions to be Taken Against Prison Guards". Amandala. Belize. 3 November 2020.
3. "A Deeper Look into the 2020 Prison Break – Part 1". Amandala. Belize. 11 February 2021.
4. "A Deeper Look into the 2020 Prison Break – Part 2". Amandala. Belize. 17 February 2021.
5. "Prison Breakout Investigation Concludes". Channel 7 News. Belize. 2 December 2020.
6. "Major Prison Break in Belize". Loop News. Jamaica. 13 October 2020.
7. Murillo V (16 February 2021). Annual Report 2020 (Report). Belize: Kolbe Fdn.
8. Murillo V (16 June 2022). Annual Report 2021 (Report). Belize: Kolbe Fdn.
