= Hummingbird heist =

1998 highway robbery in Belize

- Location: 17.21780°N 88.77615°W; Hummingbird Highway, Cayo, Belize
- Date: 2 May 1998 ca 7:00 am to ca 10:00 am CT
- Attack type: Armed robbery
- Deaths: 2 (incl 1 bandit)
- Injuries: 2–3 police
- Victims: ca 125 (official); ca 100 to ca 400 (unofficial)
- Assailant: 7 bandits (at least)
- Motive: Monetary gain
- Accused: 3
- Convicted: 0

The Hummingbird heist (Note: Also Hummingbird Highway robbery, Hummingbird robbery, Hummingbird holdup.) was an armed robbery on the morning of 2 May 1998 on the Hummingbird Highway in Cayo, Belize. At least seven heavily armed men in masks (allegedly Guatemalan military, ex-military, or guerrillas) held hostage and robbed at gunpoint some 25 to some 75 vehicles (and their circa 100 to circa 400 drivers and passengers) for about one to about three hours. The assault resulted in the death of 19 year old BDF soldier Genaro Che, gunshot injuries to two to three responding BPD police officers, and a fatal gunshot injury to one of the bandits. Some 30 to 36 people were detained in connection with the crime. Charges were brought against three of them, but eventually dropped. The case remained unsolved as of 2016. The heist is deemed the largest armed robbery in the country's history, and a possible instance of terrorism (by press).

== Background ==
Belize's highways were inaugurated in 1825 (with a rude thoroughfare for horses from Belize Town to Pine Ridge). By the 1990s, armed robberies on them were deemed rare, often small, impromptu crimes of opportunity (as had been the case in a string of such instances in March 1998 from Orange Walk to Stann Creek). On the first weekend of May 1998, Labour Day celebrations may have brought above-average traffic to the country's highways.

== Heist ==
At some point after circa 7:00 am CT on 2 May 1998, at least seven masked bandits (allegedly self-dubbed Guerrillas Without Borders) set up a simulated car crash (vehicle on its side) on Hummingbird Highway, three miles south of Belmopan, and lay in wait to ambush unsuspecting passers-by at gunpoint. Their first victims (four Big H truckers; arrived at some point between circa 7:00 am and circa 9:00 am) were reportedly "stunned and confused" when suddenly confronted by heavily armed (AK 47s and 9 mm pistols) men in masks and what looked like Guatemalan military fatigues. The truckers were forced to lie down whilst their truck was used to block off the highway. As vehicles piled up, motorists and passengers were forced to alight and lie down after being robbed of their cash and valuables. They were given assurances that no one would be hurt if the robbers' instructions were followed faithfully, but were also threatened that the outlaws "had someone special who would go after" anyone who tried to run away.

At some point, a James passenger bus arrived on the scene, with 19 year old BDF volunteer Genaro Che aboard. As Che stepped off the bus, he handed the bandits one dollar. (Note: News 5 1998a. Che had reportedly been retrieving more cash from his socks when he was shot, after the robbers had demanded more than a dollar (Amandala 2016b). His brother (Agostino Che) alleged he was shot after the bandits had confirmed he was a BDF soldier (Amandala 2016b).) In an apparent fit of rage, one of them shot and killed Che, and then had the conductor and two passengers carry the corpse to display before hostages to "make them see that if they [robbers] start to search and they find [only] one dollar [on the hostages] he [Che's killer] will start to kill".

Shortly after 10:00 am, three policemen arrived on the scene, prompting the seven outlaws to commandeer a grey-green Dodge Ram pickup and flee towards Belmopan. They engaged police in a shootout, leaving two or three policemen injured, and one bandit as well (fatally). The highwaymen are thought to have made it to Peten, Guatemala in about 30 minutes, as the Dodge Ram (with the lifeless body of the shot outlaw) was shortly afterwards located on Arenal Road near Arenal, Cayo (less than a mile from Peten).

In the span of one to three hours, circa 25 to circa 75 vehicles had been forced off the highway, with over 100, circa 125, over 150, circa 200, or close to 400 motorists and passengers forced to alight, robbed at gunpoint, and made to lie down as the heist ensued. Police pegged the numbers at approximately 25 vehicles and close to 125 victims, but eyewitnesses reported the numbers were "considerably more" than official figures. Victims included Mayor of Belmopan Anthony Chanona and family, government minister Russell Chiste Garcia, and citrus magnate Denzil Jenkins.

== Aftermath ==
In a 5 May press conference, Minister of National Security Dean Barrow confirmed the already-held suspicion that the bandits had come from Guatemala (noting they had likely received local aid), confirmed cooperation by Guatemalan authorities, and promised "beefing up patrols" on all major highways by both BPD and BDF. (Note: News 5 1998b. Among other measures, like a 24/7 hotline for tips (News 5 1998c). Anti-terrorist training (or unit) was promised, but by 2003 it was unclear whether it had been delivered (News 5 2003).) Barrow further speculated the robbers may have been Guatemalan military or ex-military, possibly "turning to crime and violence" in an effort to make up for lost income due to recent downsizing of Guatemala's armed forces ("a result of the signing of the peace process"). (Note: News 5 1998b. Commentator G Michael Reid noted they had "obvious extensive military training" (News 5 1998d). Commissioner of Police Ornel Brooks noted "a number of them are ex-military, as well as ex-guerrillas" (News 5 1998f). Amandala added they had "displayed a substantial amount of military training and discipline" (Amandala 2016a).) He later added the heist could have been retaliation for recent deportations from Belmopan.

Police were criticised for taking "nearly an hour" to reach the scene, but Acting Commissioner of Police Lester Garnet noted a report was not received in Belmopan "until shortly after ten o’clock on Saturday morning". The bandits' ability "to boldly ride halfway across the nation in broad daylight without official hindrance" was also criticised, (Note: News 5 1998d; News 5 1998f; News 5 1998j; News 5 1998n. In 2016, Amandala noted this lapse "was never explained [...] no one was talking" (Amandala 2016a).) though Barrow noted police had had "hardly enough time [...] to set up any effective roadblocks along the way", adding "our borders are porous [...] it’s a matter of impracticability to seal the border". (Note: News 5 1998b. There had been reports that a policeman in San Ignacio, Cayo had failed to detain the bandits when tipped off, allegedly noting "that it was in fact not his problem for it was out of his jurisdiction" (News 5 1998d; News 5 1998e).)

On 3 May, Scott Coleman (44; cabbie who had driven the seven robbers from Benque, Cayo to Las Flores, Belmopan, shortly after 7:00 am on 2 May) was detained for interrogation, though family noted Coleman had merely been doing his job. Coleman was released with no charges on 7 May. On 10 May, police detained Carlos Cervantes Castro (39; Salvadoran refugee) and Jose Pastor Leiva (69; Salvadoran refugee) on suspicion of aiding and abetting, after finding alleged heist proceeds (118 jewellery pieces; circa $9,000 to $10,000 cash) in their homes. Both were later found to have "had nothing to do with the crime". On 15 May, police revealed they had five known suspects, three of whom were believed to be in Guatemala, and two Guatemalan nationals who had been arrested on 13–14 May in Stann Creek: Alfonso Teul (46) and Eluterio Vasquez (24). But their colleagues and supervisor promptly provided an "airtight alibi", alleging both Teul and Vasquez had been at work all morning (at an HTA Bowman orange walk at Mile 13 1/2 on Stann Creek Valley Road) on 2 May. (Note: News 5 1998g. Their colleagues stopped work on 16 May in an effort to get "the boss to do something about it because the guys [Teul and Vasquez] are innocent" (News 5 1998g). By 19 May, "no less than a dozen witnesses" had come forward to back this alibi (News 5 1998i). Even more witnesses followed on 20 May (News 5 1998k).) Police alleged their evidence "point[ed] conclusively to the suspects’ [Teul's and Vasquez's] direct involvement in the crime". On 18 May, both were charged with murder, conspiracy to commit murder, and robbery, and remanded to Hattieville. On 27 May, a third suspect (Orlando Urbina; 31 year old Salvadoran) was arrested and charged for the heist, allegedly because his 9 mm handgun and two bandanas forensically matched those used in the heist. By the end of May, 30 other individuals (including 14 refugees) had been arrested for the heist, all eventually released without charges. On 30 December, DPP Adolph Lucas dropped the charges against all three suspects. By 2000, no further arrests had been made, with police noting they were "no closer to solving the case" then. (Note: News 5 2000. Commissioner of Police Hughington Williams noted, "the perpetrators, for the most part, are out of this country" (News 5 2000).) The case remained cold by 2016.

Police were further criticised for "ineptitude and brutality" in their handling of this case. Coleman's family noted police had provided no information on his health nor welfare (not even his whereabouts) during his detention, despite their many entreaties. Criticism was "compounded by mass roundups in the Hispanic suburbs of Belmopan" on 10 May, and the arrests of Teul and Vasquez "despite the solid testimony of Belizean co-workers and supervisors who swear they were picking oranges at the time of the crime". By 19 May, "no less than a dozen witnesses" had come forward to support Teul's and Vasquez's alibi, while a JP who had witnessed their identification parade revealed "three out of the four witnesses failed to identify Vasquez as being on the scene". Even more witnesses backed their alibi on 20 May. When the issue came up in Parliament on 22 May, Barrow defended the arrests, noting the evidence was "so strong that the idea of withdrawing the charges at this time is totally out of the question". When the DPP dropped the charges on 30 December, News 5 noted the case against Teul, Vasquez, and Urbina "appeared from the beginning to rest more on wishful thinking than on evidence". BDT (Caye Caulker charity) labelled this case an instance of police torture. US State noted some detainees were held beyond the 72-hour limit without access to legal counsel, some were released but immediately detained again, and at least one detainee accused police of torture and abuse in an attempt to compel a confession.

The ease with which the heist was pulled off gave rise to fears of copycats, despite Barrow's assurances that there was "small chance" of that. On 17 July 1999, at least three masked men in fatigues, armed with a rifle and pump action shotguns, held up and robbed at least eight vehicles on Hummingbird (including a heist victim), this time sans casualties.

== Legacy ==
The heist is deemed "the largest armed robbery in Belize’s history". Barrow called the heist "bold, brazen and outrageous". Commentator G Michael Reid noted the bandits "came as close as any group from that country [Guatemala] ever has to making good on Guatemala’s perpetual threat to invade our sovereign nation". Mayor of Belmopan (and heist victim) Anthony Chanona noted his daughter "and many more people [victims] carry emotional scars", adding "our country was invaded, we were terrorised [...] it’s important that we remember and that we prepare ourselves because it could happen again, God forbid". News 5 called it "the most brazen crime ever committed in Belize", dubbing the bandits "terrorists". 7 News called it "one of the most notorious crimes in Belizean history". Amandala called it the country's "first act of Guatemalan terrorism", (Note: Amandala 2016b. A reader noted it had been "simply a heinous criminal act" that "in no shape or form [could] be considered terrorism" (Amandala 2016d).) deeming Che "Belize’s first military casualty/martyr in the framework of [modern] Guatemalan aggression".

By 2005, the heist was being annually commemorated by victims, Che's family, and BPD and BDF officials and members. The heist's second anniversary was further marked by the inauguration of a police substation in St Margaret's, Cayo by Minister of National Security Jorge Espat and Mayor of Belmopan Anthony Chanona. The fifth anniversary was attended by Minister of Defence Sylvia Flores and Chanona. The seventh anniversary was attended by Commissioner of Police Gerald Westby. The eighteenth anniversary was also marked by Amandala. Commemorations were discontinued by 2016.

By 2016, Che's family had not been compensated for his death. By June 2016, TV and radio personality Carolyn Yaya Marin Coleman was protesting to get the family compensation, hoping to "keep the memory of Genaro Che alive and honoured". On 21 October 2024, Che's son (26 year old BDF soldier Genaro Che Jr) also died on a highway (collision on Southern Highway in Jacinto, Toledo), in a section "without proper marking or illumination".

== See also ==
- Mayflower grenade attack – 2008 alleged terrorist act
- List of cases of police brutality in Belize

== Notes and references ==
1. "Masked men hold up hundreds of people on the Hummingbird Highway". News 5. 4 May 1998.
2. "Police appeal helps solve Saturday's Hummingbird Highway robbery". News 5. 5 May 1998.
3. "Cayo taxi man may have unknowingly driven highway bandits". News 5. 7 May 1998.
4. "G. Michael Reid comments on highway robbery". News 5. 8 May 1998.
5. "Police recover jewelry from Hummingbird heist". News 5. 11 May 1998.
6. "Two suspects arrested in Hummingbird holdup". News 5. 15 May 1998.
7. "Witnesses give airtight alibi for Hummingbird robbery suspects". News 5. 18 May 1998.
8. "Brooks questions motives of witnesses; says evidence points to suspects' guilt". News 5. 18 May 1998.
9. "Attorney says case may be difficult to prove". News 5. 19 May 1998.
10. "Brooks' accusations contradicted by J.P." News 5. 19 May 1998.
11. "More Stann Creek witnesses assert innocence of Teul and Vasquez". News 5. 20 May 1998.
12. "Barrow defends controversial arrests by police". News 5. 22 May 1998.
13. "New suspect charged in Hummingbird murder". News 5. 3 June 1998.
14. "D.P.P. releases Hummingbird suspects". News 5. 30 December 1998.
15. "G. Michael Reid looks at the past year". News 5. 31 December 1998.
16. Beatings, torture, arrests by national police forces: A grim look at future Belize (Report). BDT. 1999.
17. Belize Country Report on Human Rights Practices for 1998 (Report). US State. 26 February 1999.
18. "Robbers on Hummingbird Highway". News 5. 19 July 1999.
19. "New police station marks anniversary of highway holdup". News 5. 2 May 2000.
20. "5th anniversary of May second hold-up marked". News 5. 2 May 2003.
21. "Memorial held for 1998 Hummingbird murder victim". News 5. 3 May 2005.
22. "From the publisher". Amandala. 17 May 2016.
23. "Belize experienced its first act of Guatemalan terrorism on May 2, 1998". Amandala. 4 June 2016.
24. "Yaya, one-woman army, battles for Genaro Che's family". Amandala. 4 June 2016.
25. "Clarification from Glenda Parham". Amandala. 22 June 2016.
26. "Young BDF soldier dies in motorcycle collision". 7 News. 22 October 2024.
