= Roads in Belize =

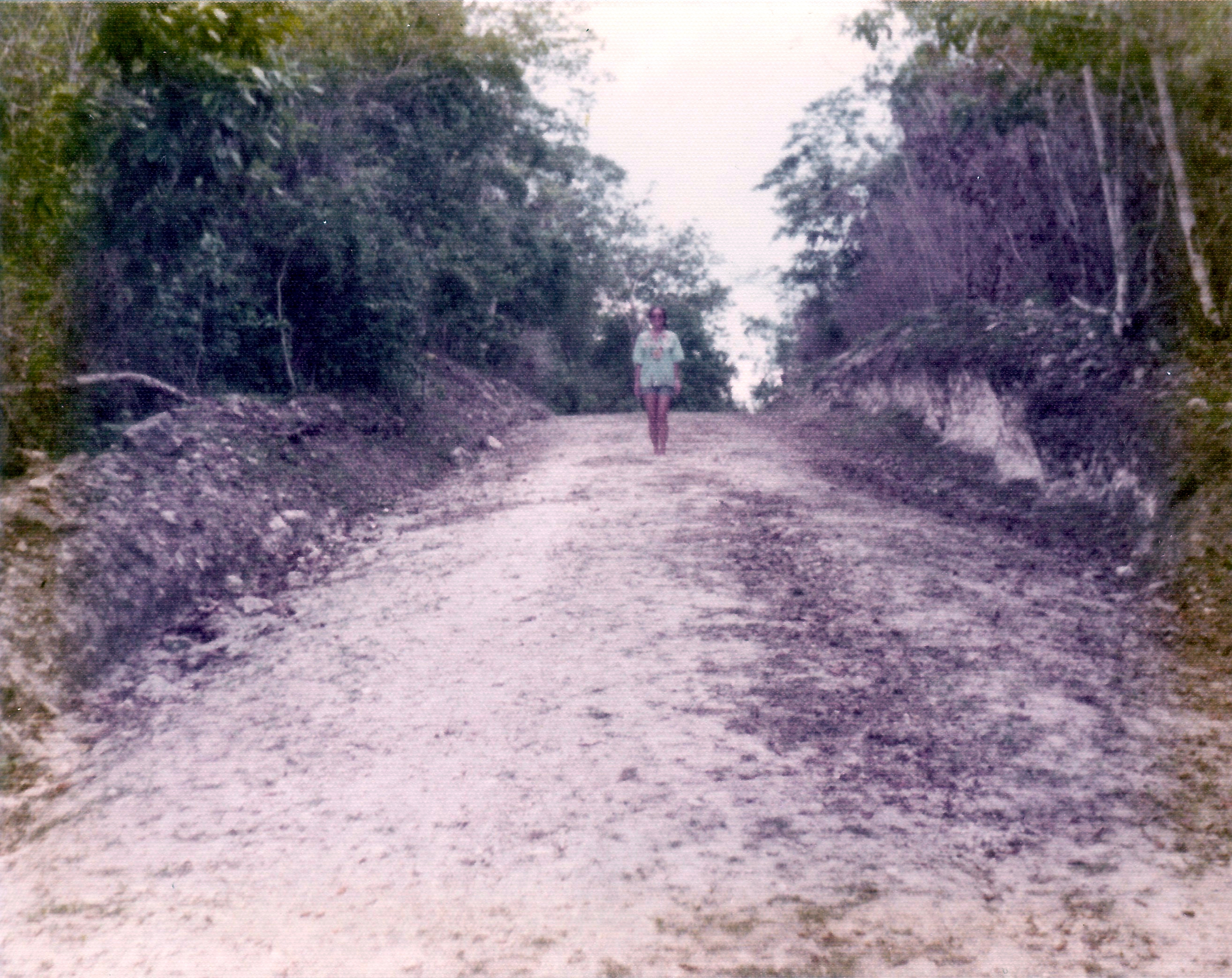
Dirt road in Xuantunich, Belize circa 1975

The road network in Belize consists of over 1,900 miles (3,000 km) of roads, of which approximately 357 miles (575 km) is paved.

== History ==
In 1888 steps were taken to declare all the old cattle and truck passes, which had been habitually used as public thoroughfares, public highways, in the meaning of the Act, in order to prevent their beings gradually obliterated and effaced ; and that, in the event of roads being made in these directions, they should serve as rights of way for the construction of the roads. The Road Board was created by Act 27 Vict. cap. 17, which was passed "to provide for the making and maintaining of roads throughout the colony." This Act was framed especially with the object of constructing the Western Road, and powers were conferred on the Commissioners to levy tolls, &c., in connection with ferries and toll-houses.

== Highways ==
'"`UNIQ--templatestyles-00000007-QINU`"'
Thomas Vincent Ramos Highway
'"`UNIQ--templatestyles-00000008-QINU`"'
Hummingbird Highway
'"`UNIQ--templatestyles-00000009-QINU`"'
Coastal Highway
'"`UNIQ--templatestyles-0000000A-QINU`"'
George Price Highway
'"`UNIQ--templatestyles-0000000B-QINU`"'
Philip Goldson Highway

Primary Highways
| Name | Constructed | Paved | Length | From | To |
|---|---|---|---|---|---|
| Philip Goldson Hwy | | | 95 mi | Belize City | Mexican border |
| George Price Hwy | | | 78 mi | Belize City | Guatemalan Border |
| Hummingbird Hwy | | | 55 mi | Dangriga | Belmopan |
| Coastal Plain Hwy | | | 36 mi | Dangriga | La Democracia |
| Thomas Vincent Ramos Hwy | | | 97 mi | Dangriga | Punta Gorda |

Secondary Highways
| Name | Constructed | Paved | Length | From | To |
|---|---|---|---|---|---|
| Remate Bypass | | | 11 mi | San Pedro | Chan Chen |
| Sarteneja Rd | | | 27 mi | Corozal | Sarteneja |
| San Victor Rd | | | 6 mi | San Narciso | San Victor |
| San Antonio Rd | | | 12 mi | Orange Walk | Santa Cruz |
| San Felipe Rd | | | 18 mi | Yo Creek | San Felipe |
| Blue Creek Rd | | | 27 mi | San Felipe | Blue Creek |
| Old Northern Hwy | | | 41 mi | Sand Hill | Carmelita |
| Burrell Boom Rd | 1950s | 2003 | 12 mi | Hattieville | Gentleville |
| John Smith Rd | | | 5 mi | Western Paradise | PGIA |
