= Kent Bowers =

Belizean murderer (died 1985)

- Born: 1967; British Honduras
- Died: 19 June 1985 (aged 18); Hattieville Prison, Hattieville, Belize
- Status: Executed
- Conviction: Murder
- Penalty: Death

Kent Bowers (died 19 June 1985) was a Belizean man convicted of murder and executed by Belize. He is the most recent person to have been executed in Belize.

On 4 July 1984, Bowers, then 17, entered a restaurant in Belize City where Francis Codd and Dora Codd were hosting a private party for their twenty-fifth wedding anniversary. According to testimony heard when the case later went to trial, Bowers was asked to leave and their son, Robert Codd, escorted him to the door. A struggle ensued outside between Bowers and Codd, and Bowers stabbed Codd several times. Codd died within minutes of the incident.

Bowers was arrested and charged with murder. He was convicted on 23 October 1984 and given the mandatory sentence of death by hanging. Bowers appealed his conviction to the Court of Appeal of Belize, but his arguments were rejected. Bowers's petition for clemency was rejected by the Governor General Dame Elmira Minita Gordon.

Bowers was executed at the age of 18 on 19 June 1985 at Her Majesty's Prison on Goal Lane Belize City. No one has been executed by Belize since Bowers, but capital punishment remains as a possible legal punishment in Belize.

== See also ==
- Glenford Baptist, Belize's most recent death row prisoner
- Nora Parham, only Belizean woman to be executed
