= Killing of Laddie Gillett =

2021 police killing in Belize

Coordinates: 16.52489°N 88.36794°W

- Gillett in 2021
- Date: 14 July 2021
- Time: ca 9:30 pm local time
- Location: Placencia Beach Club, Placencia, Stann Creek
- Type: Unlawful police killing
- Target: Two teenagers
- Perpetrators: Two plain clothes police officers, one security guard
- Deaths: 1 (Gillett)
- Injuries: 1 (Palacio)
- Convicted: 1 (Martinez)
- Convictions: Manslaughter by negligence
- Sentence: 18 years

On 14 July 2021, at approximately 9:30 pm local time, in Placencia, Stann Creek, 14-year-old Laddie Gillett was shot and killed by police corporal Kareem Martinez. The incident sparked widespread protests in Belize, being popularly deemed an unlawful police killing. Martinez was found guilty of manslaughter by negligence for the killing on 21 April 2023, and sentenced to 18 years in prison.

== Background ==
The use of excessive force (including fatal) by law enforcement in Belize is thought to be on the rise, following a yet unmitigated boom in violent and organised crime since the late 1990s. (Note: Warnecke 2019, for instance, found that the homicide rate in Belize has been steadily increasing since the late 1990s (pp. 4-6, 197, 209), noting that the vast majority of crime is often blamed on gangs by the state, scholars, and media (pp. 1, 8, 198, 209-210), and that the state often responds to such crime with brutal repression (pp. 1, 8, 198, 223-225).) A 2019 study by Hannes Warnecke-Berger of the University of Leipzig noted 'police brutality seems to have become an everyday practice [which includes] the beating of children in the streets, torture of suspects in custody as well as police killings.' Similarly, a 2021 poll by the World Justice Project found that only 47 percent of respondents believed police do not use excessive force, with only 35 percent believing police were investigated for misconduct.

== Killing ==
On the night of 14 July, 14-year-old Laddie Gillett and his 19-year-old friend Thomas Palacio were making their way back to Chabil Mar Villas in Placencia, Stann Creek, where they were holidaying, at a brisk pace in order to beat the COVID-19 curfew, after having dropped off a female friend back at her resort. (Note: US State Department 2022, sec 1A para 3; Loop 2021, paras 1, 3, 11; Reporter 2021, paras 10-12; Amandala 2021a, p. 1; Amandala 2021b, p. 4. The COVID-19 regulations in effect at the time (Statutory Instrument No 74 of 2021) set a 6 pm curfew for unaccompanied and 10 pm curfew for accompanied minors on Wednesdays (Reporter 2021, para 15). Gillett's uncle, Emil Bradley, claimed 'his nephew was only a couple of yards away from the condo that the family had rented [in Chabil Mar] and that he could see them [Gillett and Palacio] from where they were hanging out and could even shout over at them if need be' (Reporter 2021, para 12). Palacio claimed that he and Gillett and their female friend had been having cake at the beach before dropping her off at her resort, a two minute walk from Chabil Mar (Amandala 2021b, p. 4).) Shortly after 9:30 pm local time, in front of the Placencia Beach Club, the boys came across two men in dark clothing confronting them with guns (who were not uniformed, and did not identify themselves as police officers, according to Palacio). (Note: US State Department 2022, sec 1A para 3; Amandala 2021b, p. 4; "One Last Run for Laddie". 7 News. Belize. 14 July 2022. paras 1–3. The officers had been called in at circa 9:30 pm local time for suspicious activity by the security guard of a resort near the scene, according to the Police Department (Loop 2021, para 4; Reporter 2021, para 7; Amandala 2021a, p. 1). According to the same, the guard and responding officers were on high alert that night as the aforementioned resort had allegedly seen multiple break in attempts the night prior (Reporter 2021, para 7, 9). Gillett's biological uncle, Henry Gillett, noted that racism may have played a role in the level of distrust and aggression displayed by the guard and officers (Amandala 2021d, p. 3). Gillett's adoptive family, the Bradley-Flemings, expressed similar disbelief as to what exactly could have been suspicious about Gillett and Palacio's having cake at the beach (Amandala 2021e, pp. 6, 10).) Believing they were about to be robbed at gunpoint, the boys immediately ran away from the armed men, whereupon Gillett was shot and killed by police corporal Kareem Martinez (with his 9 mm service pistol), while Palacio was tackled and physically assaulted by police constable Claude Augustine and a nearby security guard Devon Castillo. (Note: US State Department 2022, sec 1A para 3; Loop 2021, paras 3-4, 9-10; Reporter 2021, para 8; Amandala 2023f, p. 42; Amandala 2023h, pp. 1, 13. Gillett was pronounced dead on arrival at Placencia Polyclinic (Reporter 2021, para 8; Amandala 2021a, p. 1). Palacio reported he feared for his life at that point (US State Department 2022, sec 1A para 3; Amandala 2021b, p. 4). Palacio's mother claimed that upon Gillett's death, Augustine asked Martinez, 'What will we do with this one?' (Amandala 2021a, p. 37).)

== Aftermath ==
By 15 July, Martinez had been detained pending criminal and internal investigations. (Note: Reporter 2021, para 2-3; Amandala 2021a, p. 37; Amandala 2021c, pp. 1–2.) On 16 July, the corporal was charged with manslaughter by negligence and granted bail of $8,000 while awaiting trial. (Note: US State Department 2022, sec 1A para 3; Amandala 2021c, p. 1.) The internal investigation led to Martinez’s dismissal from the Police Department by the year's end. The former corporal was found guilty of manslaughter by negligence on 21 April 2023, and sentenced to 18 years in Central Prison on 23 May. (Note: Amandala 2023f, pp. 1, 42; Amandala 2023h, pp. 1, 13. As of the date of Martinez's conviction, Augustine had not been disciplined by the Police Department, though the court noted the threatening, physical assault, and false imprisonment of Palacio had been potentially criminal (Amandala 2023h, p. 13).)

The incident sparked outrage across the country, with multiple candlelit vigils for Gillett, and protests demanding that Martinez be charged with murder, and further demanding police reform. (Note: Civicus Monitor 2021, para 1; Reporter 2021, para 14; Amandala 2021a, p. 37; Neal RA (16 July 2021). "Outrage!". Amandala. No. 3474. Belize. p. 6.; Amandala 2021c, p. 2; Amandala 2021d, p. 3; Lopez M (20 July 2021). "Child Victim – Individual or Systemic Flaw?". Amandala. No. 3475. Belize. pp. 5, 13.; Amandala 2021e, pp. 6, 10; Amandala 2023f, p. 1. On 20 July in Camalote, Cayo, two men were detained for allegedly setting tyres on fire on a highway in protest of the killing (Civicus Monitor 2021, para 1). A similar protest set for 1 August in Belize City was denied a permit by the Police Department (Civicus Monitor 2021, para 1).) The Prime Minister, Johnny Briceno, condemned the incident, stating 'there must be consequences' for the killing, and agreeing that police needed continuous training on the proper use of lethal force. The Commissioner of Police, Chester Williams, said the shooting was not a justifiable use of force. (Note: US State Department 2022, sec 1A para 3; Loop 2021, paras 5-7; Reporter 2021, paras 1-2, 4; Amandala 2021a, p. 37.) The Minister of Youth, Kevin Bernard, echoed Briceno's and Williams's sentiments. The Human Rights Commission denounced the killing and stressed that 'this kind of systematic abuse of authority by some police officers and their disregard of the humanity and dignity of Belizean citizens can no longer be countenanced.' The Progressive Party condemned the 'recurrent issues of brutality' by the police and 'diminished charges assigned to officers involved […] the scandalously low rate of successful prosecution of said officers, and the light sentences accorded to the few that would be found guilty.' The United Democratic Party called for 'a full and objective investigation,' urging the Police Department to ensure officers refrained from excessive force.

Gillett's family called for the passing of Laddie's Law, which would establish civilian oversight of the Police Department, among other policing reforms. They founded the Justice for Laddie Foundation within a year to 'to carry on Laddie's legacy and provide support for Belize's young people.'

== See also ==
- List of killings by law enforcement officers in Belize – noted or reported cases
- List of cases of police brutality in Belize – noted or reported cases

== Notes and references ==
=== References ===
1. "Unjustified Force! Cop Kills Youth, 14, Who was Trying to Obey COVID-19 Curfew". The Reporter. Belize. 15 July 2021.
2. "Belize: 14-Year-Old Fatally Shot by Police, Probe Launched". Loop. Jamaica. 16 July 2021.
3. "Belize: Protesters Demand Justice for Teenager Killed by Police". Civicus Monitor. South Africa. 28 October 2021.
4. 2021 Country Reports on Human Rights Practices: Belize (Report). USA: State Dept. 12 April 2022. This article incorporates text from this source, which is in the public domain.
5. "Boy, 14, Killed by Police". Amandala. No. 3474. Belize. 16 July 2021.
6. "Laddie's Companion Sets Record Straight". Amandala. No. 3475. Belize. 20 July 2021.
7. "PC Martinez Charged for Laddie's Death". Amandala. No. 3475. Belize. 20 July 2021.
8. "Laddie's Death Sparks Weekend of Outcry". Amandala. No. 3475. Belize. 20 July 2021.
9. "Laddie Gillett: A Fallen Star, A Rising Angel". Amandala. No. 3476. Belize. 23 July 2021.
10. "Former P.C. Gets 18 Years for Taking Laddie Gillett's Life". Amandala. No. 3650. Belize. 26 May 2023.
11. Warnecke-Berger H (2019). Politics and Violence in Central America and the Caribbean. Switzerland: Palgrave Macmillan Cham. doi:10.1007/978-3-319-89782-0. ISBN 978-3-319-89781-3. LCCN 2018942510.
12. "Justice for Laddie Celebrated". Amandala. No. 3642. Belize. 25 April 2023.
