= Western Highway =

Western Highway may refer to:

- Western Highway (Victoria) in Australia
- Western Highway (Belize)
- Länsiväylä ("Western Highway") in Finland
