= Glenford Baptist =

Belizean man

- Conviction: Murder
- Penalty: Death (overturned), Twenty-five years

Details
- Victims: 1
- Country: Belize

Glenford Baptist is a Belizean man who was convicted of murder and sentenced to death along with two other men under the doctrine of joint enterprise for a murder committed in July 2000. He is Belize's longest-serving death row inmate.

In 2015, Baptist's death sentence was overturned and reduced to 25 years in prison.

== Crime ==
Baptist was one of three men sentenced to death by hanging in November 2001 after they were convicted of murdering Azrin White, who was shot dead on the night of 24 July 2000.

Along with Oscar Mendez and Gilroy Wade Jr., Baptist was held in Belize's Central Prison to await execution.

Mendez successfully appealed his sentence in June 2002, arguing that he had been wrongly identified by a witness. He was released from prison.

Wade was killed by another prisoner in 2007.

Baptist's case was taken up by the Death Penalty Project, an organisation which offers free legal representation to prisoners who have been sentenced to death. In July 2015 his lawyer, Priscilla Banner, successfully challenged his death sentence, arguing that his constitutional rights had been breached due to the length of time he had spent on death row, which had caused him to be subjected to inhumane treatment and punishment. She also argued that the automatic death sentence given to Baptist was a breach of his constitutional rights.

== Reversal ==
In July 2015, Chief Justice Kenneth Benjamin overturned Baptist's death sentence and scheduled him to be re-sentenced later in the year.

On 21 December 2015, Baptist was sentenced to 25 years in prison, which would be backdated to the date of his original conviction, meaning that he had already served 14 years of his 25-year sentence.

== Media ==
In the UK, the case was featured in a Channel 5 documentary in early 2016, titled "14 Years On Death Row: At Death's Door".

== See also ==
- Kent Bowers – Currently the last person executed by Belize
