= Museum of Belize =

History museum in Belize

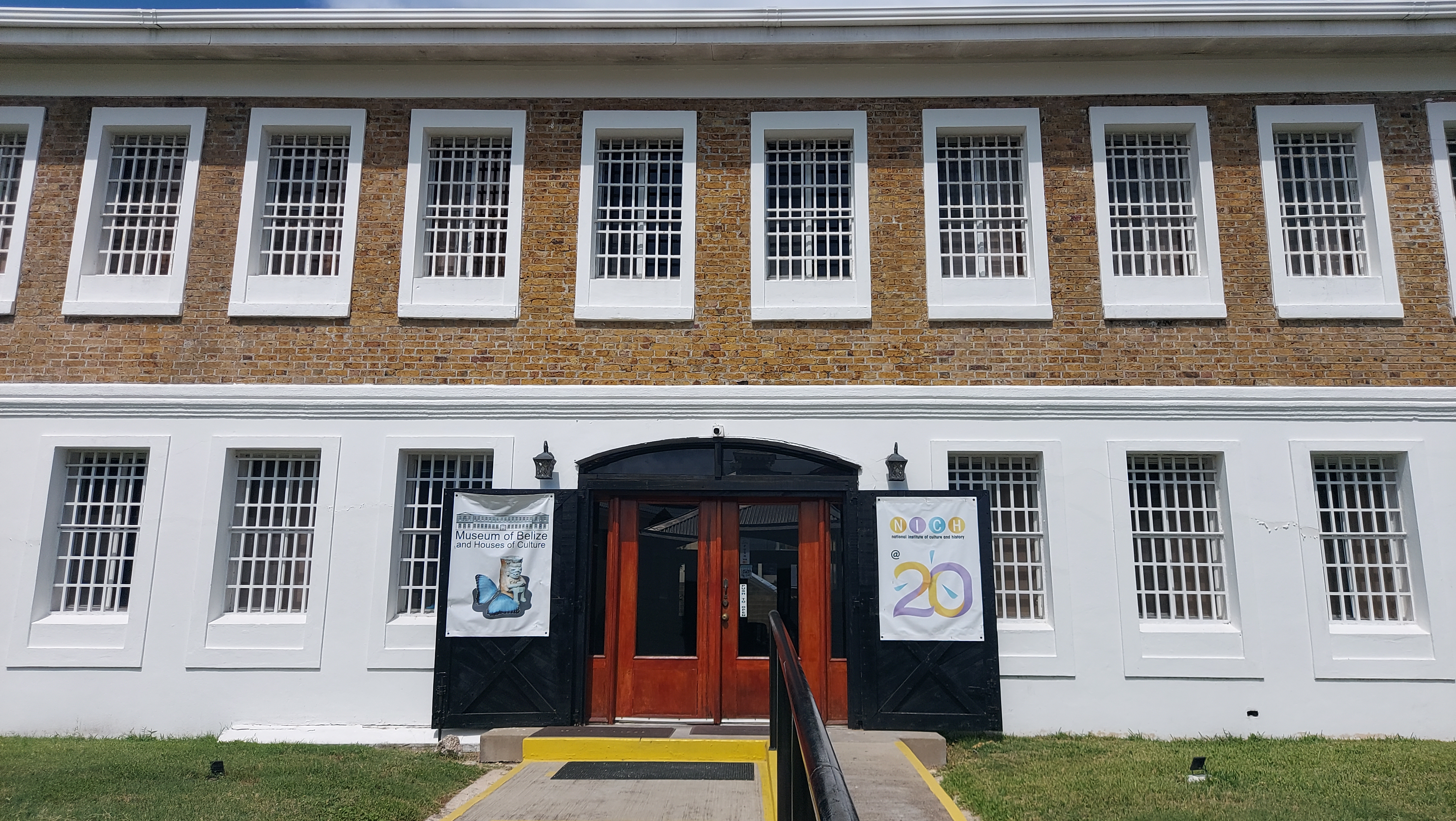
- Museum of Belize building front
- Established: 2002
- Location: Belize City, Belize
- Type: History museum

The Museum of Belize is an art and history museum in Belize City, Belize.

== History ==
Built between 1854 and 1857 as a Her Majesty’s Prison while the area was still a British colony, it was a replacement for a wooden prison nearby. It was the Belize City Prison until 1993, when prisoners were then transferred to the Hattieville Prison

In 2002, it was restored and renovated into a national museum.

== Exhibitions ==
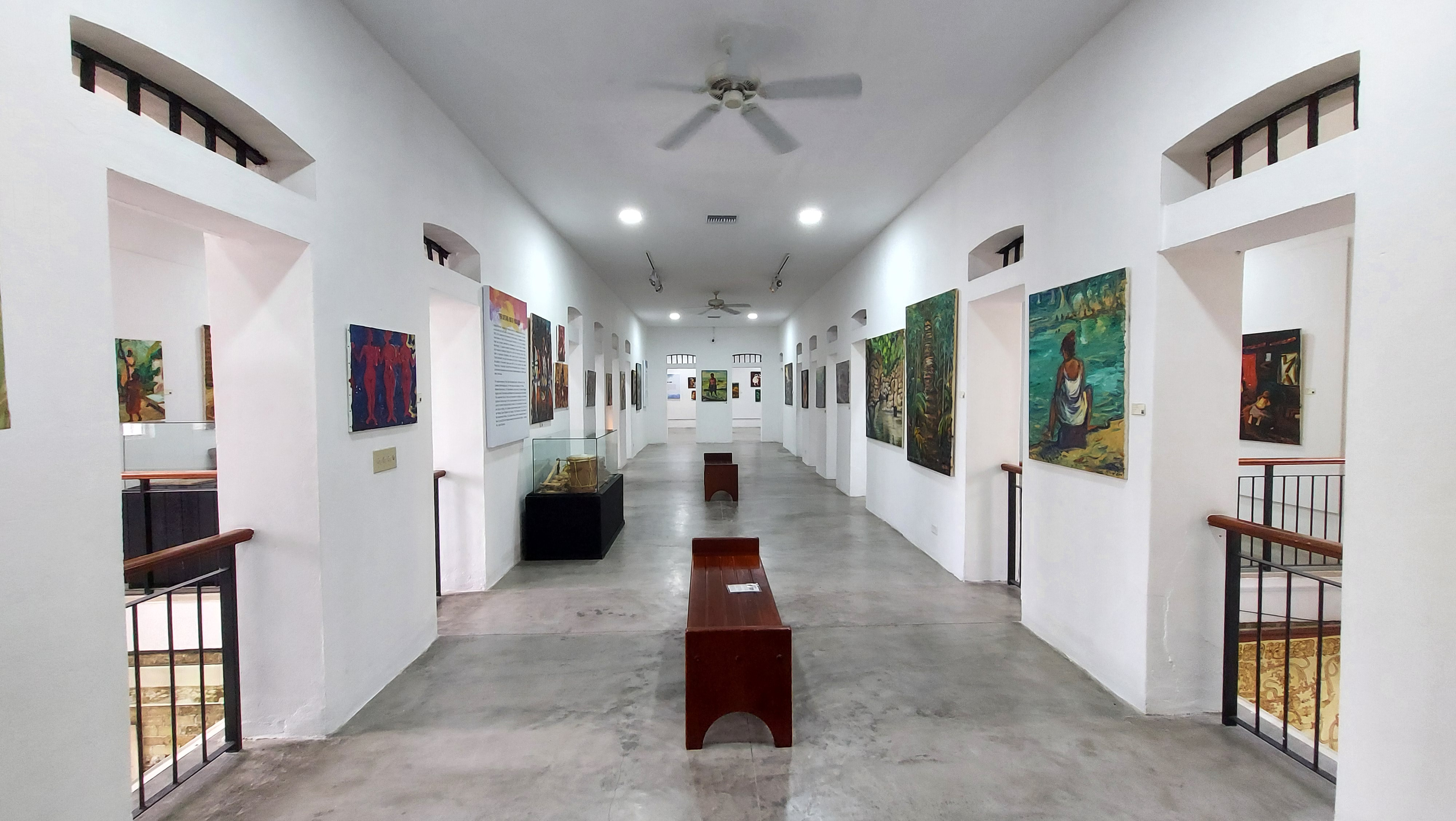
Interior exhibits

It features exhibits on slavery in Belize including a timeline, information about slave revolts and communities of escaped slaves (maroons), Maya artifacts and explores some 3,000 years of Maya history, the prison's history, colonial life, natural history, visual arts, and cultural exhibits of the many ethnic groups of the nation.
