= Nora Parham =

Executed Belizean woman (1927–1963)

Parham

Nora Parham (née Williams; 1 January 1927 – 5 June 1963) is the only woman known to have been executed by Belize (known as British Honduras at the time of her death). She was hanged for the murder by burning of her abusive partner, Ketchell Trapp. Parham was posthumously pardoned in 2022. It was determined that while Parham had intentionally thrown gasoline on Trapp, Trapp had most likely set himself on fire by accident.

== Biography ==
Parham was born on January 1, 1927, in Punta Gorda the second of four children of Alexander Williams, a mahogany contractor, and his wife Caroline. She was of South Asian ancestry, and cut a diminutive figure, standing 4 feet 8 inches (1.42 m) and weighing 115 pounds (52 kg). Though originally from Punta Gorda, she later moved to Orange Walk Town. Parham had eight children, one of whom was born in prison. Her first four children had been fathered by her estranged husband, Parham, while the father of the others was Ketchell Raymond Trapp, a constable in the British Honduras Police Force. Trapp had a reputation for drunkenness and domestic violence, and Parham had frequently complained to police about his behaviour.

== Death of Ketchell Trapp ==
Around mid-day on 6 February 1963, Ketchell Trapp caught on fire in the outhouse of the home he shared with Parham. He suffered third-degree burns to 90% of his body, with only his neck and head unharmed, and died in Belize City Hospital the following day. According to the police account of Trapp's death, Parham intentionally set Trapp on fire by throwing gasoline on him and then lighting a match. Parham admitted that she had intentionally thrown the gasoline – in the context of a domestic dispute – but denied lighting him on fire. Instead, she said Trapp had accidentally set himself on fire when he lit a cigarette.

== Trial and execution ==
After Trapp's death, Parham was arrested and remanded in Belize Central Prison. Her trial was held before the Supreme Court, and prosecuted by John Havers, the solicitor-general. She pleaded not guilty, but on 30 April 1963 an all-male jury delivered a guilty verdict after four hours' deliberation. The jury simultaneously issued a request for mercy, as was allowed, but Parham was nonetheless sentenced to death; there was no appeals process available. In the following weeks, a petition for clemency containing 2,461 signatures was delivered to the Governor of Belize, Peter Stallard, but was rejected on the advice of the People's United Party government.

Parham's fate became a partisan issue – the PUP's official newspaper, the Belize Times, stated that the sentence should be carried out to demonstrate "the respect and authority of the courts", while the opposing Belize Billboard (run by the National Independence Party) led the campaign for a pardon. Parham was hanged at 8 a.m. on 5 June 1963. A vigil held the night before was attended by 200 people, and there was a heavy police presence due to fears of a riot. She was buried in an unmarked grave, in a ceremony attended by around 2,000 people. Parham remains the only woman to have been executed in Belize.

Parham was posthumously pardoned on the 59th anniversary of her execution in 2022. There is evidence suggesting that not only had the fire itself been accidental, Parham ran to Trapp's aid when she heard him screaming.

== See also ==
- Kent Bowers, last Belizean man to be executed (1985)
