= Coastal Highway =

Coastal Highway may refer to:

== United States ==
- Delaware Route 1, between the Maryland border in Fenwick Island and Milford
- Parts of U.S. Route 98, Florida
- Georgia State Route 25, Port Wentworth, Georgia
- Maryland Route 528, Ocean City, Maryland
- Parts of U.S. Route 17, Georgia and South Carolina

== Elsewhere ==
- North West Coastal Highway, Australia
- Coastal Highway (Belize), Belize
- Thiruvananthapuram–Kasaragod Coastal Highway, the proposed Coastal Highway along the Arabian Sea in India
- Highway 2 (Israel), the Coastal Highway along the Mediterranean Sea in Israel
- Makran Coastal Highway, Pakistan
