= Philip Goldson Highway =

Highway in Belize

- Northern Highway
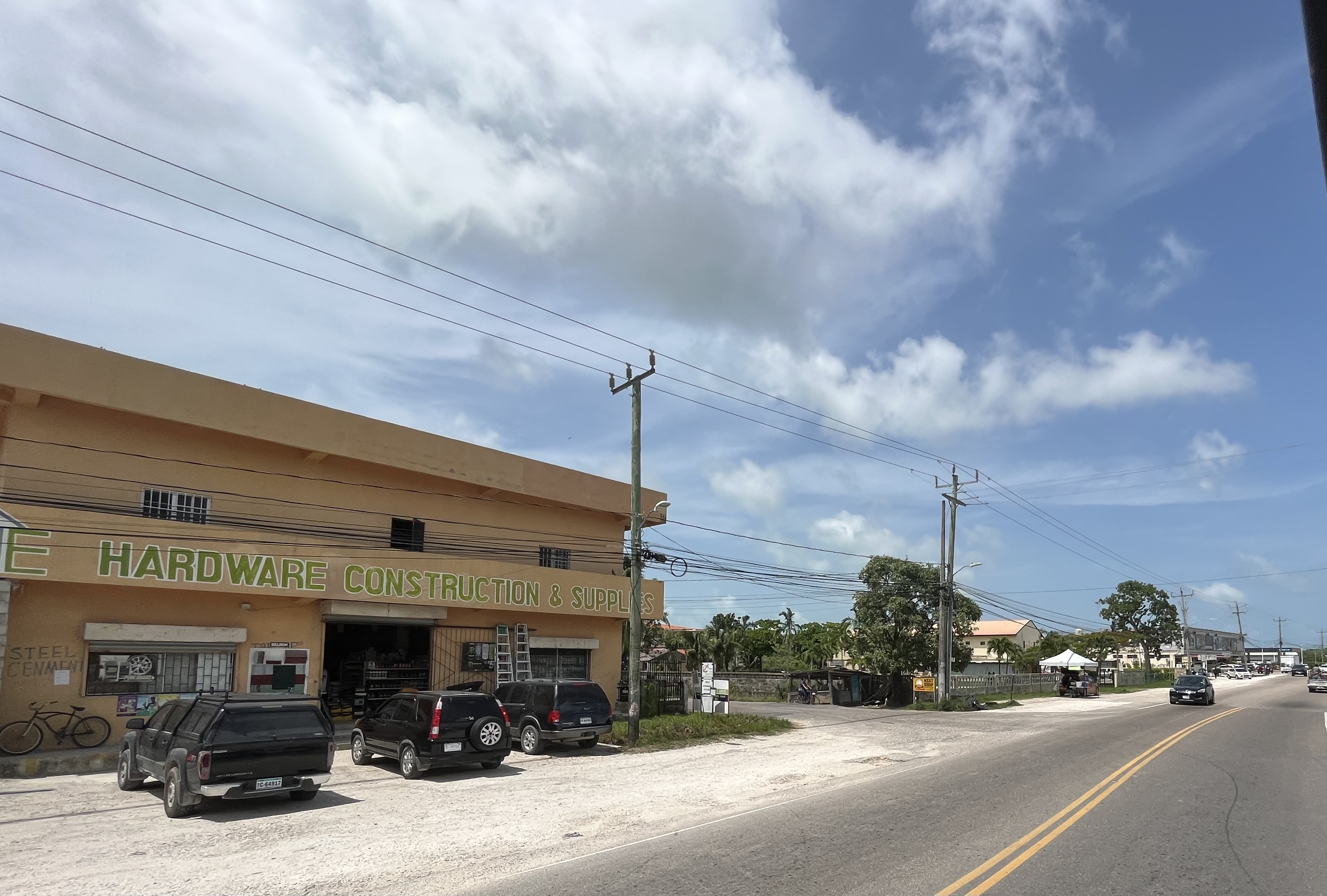

Route information
- Length: 95 mi (153 km)

Major junctions
- From: Central American Boulevard, Belize City
- Airport Road Junction, Burrell Boom Junction, Orange Walk South, Orange Walk North, Remate Bypass South, Remate Bypass North
- To: Mexican border

Location
- Country: Belize
- Districts: Belize, Orange Walk, Corozal

Highway system
- Roads in Belize

The Philip Goldson Highway in Belize joins Belize City through Orange Walk Town and Corozal Town with the Mexican border at the state of Quintana Roo. It is approximately 95 miles (153 km) long.

== History ==
=== Haulover Road ===
At a public meeting in March 1845 it was voted on to spend $600 for clearing the Haulover Road and for constructing a large scow to transport cattle at that place.

On January 21, 1848, tolls were introduced for the Haulover Ferry. 10d for every person and 1/8thd per head of cattle or horse.

In April 1866 the Haulover Road was completed.

=== Northern Highway ===
The highway was officially commissioned in 1968 as the Northern Highway.

On December 3, 1969, the Belcan Bridge was completed with a road built to the Northern Highway's junction with Freetown and Princess Margaret Drive, bringing it from a regular t-junction to a crossroad with slip roads on all sides. Around this time the boulevard was built from the Belcan Roundabout to the Buttonwood Bay roundabout.

In 1979, 30 miles (48 km) of new highway was constructed by Teichroeb and Sons which brought the route much further to the west between Belize City and Orange Walk, and much closer to Crooked Tree, to which a causeway and road was built in 1984. At the same time the Belcan and Buttonwood Bay Roundabouts were constructed.

=== Philip Goldson Highway ===
On 21 September 2012, Prime Minister Dean Barrow announced that it would be renamed the Philip Goldson Highway, named after a Belizean activist, editor and politician. The highway passes the international airport also named for Philip Goldson.

In 2015 a roundabout was constructed on Chetumal Street Boulevard.

In 2018 the stretch of road from the Buttonwood Bay Roundabout to the Chetumal Street Roundabout was widened from a two lane highway to a four lane highway with barriers in-between and frontage roads on both sides. And then from Chetumal Street Roundabout to Simeon Young Street the road was divided with a median and roundabouts constructed at Beverly Smith Lopez Street and at the North End Estate.

A rehabilitation project was started in June 2021 to repave the Philip Goldson from mile 24.5 in Biscayne to the Mexican Border. The rehabilitation project included the construction of roundabouts at Crooked Tree, south end Remate Bypass and north end Remate Bypass, and the paving of the gravel Remate Bypass. Also the straightening of the Mamayal and Tumbaito curves. And then at Libertad the t-junction was made into a curve. Also at this time the Tower Hill Bridge Toll was removed.

On March 1, 2022, the Crooked Tree Roundabout was constructed.

In 2024 a new Haulover Bridge was constructed to replace the old narrow steel truss bridge. On the north end of the bridge a roundabout was constructed.

On February 3, 2025, a rehabilitation project was started, repaving and upgrading the highway from mile 8 to mile 24.5 in Sand Hill. The plan is to build 4 roundabouts at the Airport Road Jct, Lord's Bank Jct, Burrell Boom Jct, and Old Northern Hwy Jct.

== Junction list ==
District	mile	km	Destination	Notes
Belize	0.0	0.0	Central American Boulevard to George Price Highway; Freetown Road – Belize City	Traffic circle
Belize	3.9	6.3	Bridge over Belize River	
Belize	7.4	11.9	Philip S.W. Goldson International Airport	
Belize	12.4	19.9	Burrell Boom Road	Extends 19 km to join the George Price Highway
Belize	17.5	28.1	Old Northern Highway	Gives access to Altun Ha
Belize	29.7	47.8	turnoff to Crooked Tree	
Orange Walk	48.0	77.2	Old Northern Highway	
Orange Walk	52.1-55.0	83.8-88.5	Orange Walk Town	
Corozal	78.8	126.9	Road into Corozal Town	
Corozal	87.0	140.1	junction	From junction, it is 1.3 km / 0.9 mi to the older Subtentiente Lopez bridge over Rio Hondo into Mexico. This bridge is used only for access from Mexico to the Corozal Free Zone by private vehicles and pedestrians. From junction, it is 1.9 km / 1.2 mi to the new international bridge over the Rio Hondo. This bridge is used by private vehicles entering Belize proper, as well as commercial cargo transport and tourist vehicles.

== See also ==
- Transport in Belize
