= Guatemalan Peace Process (1994–1996) =

Conclusion of the Guatemalan Civil War

The Guatemalan Peace Process was a series of negotiations occurring from 1994 to 1996, to resolve the Guatemalan Civil War.

The negotiations resulted in the signing of "The Accord for a Firm and Lasting Peace" by the government of Guatemala and the Unidad Revolucionaria Nacional Guatemalteca (URNG) on December 29, 1996.

As of 2024, the peace has lasted for 27 years. However, Guatemalan civil rights organizations "have argued that [the government's] failing to fully implement the accords has led to an emerging threat of authoritarianism" in the country.

== Background ==
=== Guatemalan armed conflict ===
The Guatemalan Civil War was a thirty-six-year internal conflict that took place from November 1960 to December 1996. The conflict was fought between the Guatemalan government and smaller leftist guerrilla groups that fought under the Unidad Revolucionaria Nacional Guatemalteca (URNG). It resulted in about 200,000 casualties and "disappearances", making it the deadliest armed conflict in Central America.

=== Early peace attempts ===
After a series of dictatorships supported by the United States, Guatemala was greatly pressured internationally to make efforts towards reincorporating democracy. In 1985, the then ruler General Oscar Mejía Victores allowed for the formation of a Constituent Assembly, which began working on a new democratic constitution. This new constitution was then finalized and ratified on May 30, 1985. The following year, democratic elections were held and Vinicio Cerezo was sworn in as president of Guatemala.

Prior to this, in 1983, the Contadora Group in the Americas, which was an initiative formed by Mexico, Venezuela, and Colombia, began promoting peace in the Central American countries undergoing internal conflicts (El Salvador, Nicaragua, and Guatemala). The group served as mediators in peace talks among all Central American rulers, which led to the drafting of the Contadora Act on Peace and Cooperation in Central America. The document did not fully receive the support of the United States and was ultimately rejected by three of the Central American countries (Honduras, El Salvador, and Costa Rica) in 1986.

Although the Contadora process was not successful, it was continued by President Cerezo in his pursuit for peace as president of Guatemala. In 1986, all five Central American rulers attended a series of meetings in Esquipulas, Guatemala. In August 1987, all five countries signed the Esquipulas II Accord, which drew heavily from the previous Contadora Act on Peace and Cooperation. This agreement outlined a framework for the resolution of the current Central American civil wars. Two important components of this accord were an amnesty law and an urgency to disarm rebel groups. The government would then have further peace talks with forces who accepted these terms.

The Esquipulas II Accord also created the National Reconciliation Commission (NRC), which allowed for a civil influence on the peace process. Although this early accord opened the dialogue for peace in Guatemala, it did not come to a concrete close of the country's internal armed conflict.

Starting in 1988 and continuing for the following years, the NRC and URNG met on several occasions and engaged in peace talks, but did not come to an end to the Guatemalan civil war. Still, the two groups signed documents, such as the Oslo Accord, Mexico Accord, and Querétaro Agreement.

=== President Serrano Elías autocoup ===
Jorge Serrano Elías was democratically elected and became president of Guatemala in January 1991. Two years and a half into his presidency, on May 25, 1993, he attempted to proclaim sole power over the country through an autocoup. He dissolved the Guatemalan congress and fragmented the Supreme Court with the help of allies in the government and military. With this, he caused a constitutional crisis in the country. However, there was strong opposition by civilians and the Constitutional Court and Serrano Elías ultimately fled to El Salvador on June 2, failing in his attempts towards dictatorship. The congress then named Ramiro de León Carpio, who was the country's Human Rights Ombudsman, as president for the time remaining of Serrano's original presidential term.

== Beginnings ==
Under Ramiro de León Carpio's presidency, the Guatemalan peace process took on new life. President de Leon made an initial proposal to restart the peace process, which was rejected by the Unidad Revolucionaria Nacional Guatemalteca (URNG). As a result, in January 1994, representatives of the government of Guatemala and the URNG met in Mexico City and signed the Framework Agreement. This agreement resumed efforts towards peace in the country and settled a new peace process through two-way negotiations brokered by the United Nations. It also established an instrumental "Group of Friends" to the Guatemalan peace process that consisted of the governments of Colombia, Mexico, Norway, Spain, the United States of America and Venezuela. Another contribution of the Framework Agreement was the creation of the Civil Society Assembly (ASC) aimed towards allowing a civil, non-governmental, sector to influence and critique the bilateral negotiations.

Under this new moderation structure, the Guatemalan government and the URNG continued to make efforts to achieve a Firm and Lasting Peace in Guatemala. In 1994, four more major agreements were signed by the disputing sides in Mexico and Oslo.

The Comprehensive Agreement on Human Rights signed on March 29 in Mexico City committed the government and the URNG to implement and enforce specified human rights. To achieve these human rights, the agreement addressed issues regarding impunity, regulations for bearing arms, the need for security forces to act under the law, the freedoms of association and movement, compulsory military service, security for parties protecting human rights, protection and services for victims of human rights violations, and halting harm inflicted on the Guatemalan population. Lastly, the agreement also required verification by part of the United Nations of the compliance of both negotiating parties with peace process agreements. This led to the successive creation of the United Nations Mission for the Verification of Human Rights and of Compliance with the Comprehensive Agreement on Human Rights in Guatemala, which was then renamed as United Nations Verification Mission in Guatemala (MINUGUA) and involved a peacekeeping mission after the final peace accord was signed in the country.

The two groups also signed the Agreement on a Timetable for the Negotiation of a Firm and Lasting Peace on March 29. This agreement outlined a schedule for the continuing discourse and negotiations for peace in Guatemala. It set December of the same year as the anticipated culmination date for the process and the signing of a final peace accord. However, this goal was delayed and achieved two years after the planned date.

Peace negotiations were also concerned with the large numbers of internally displaced populations. On June 17, the government and the URNG met in Oslo and settled the Agreement on Resettlement of the Population Groups Uprooted by the Armed Conflict. This agreement targeted the safe reintegration of the previously mentioned population into their homelands prior to the armed conflict, as well as the reestablishment of state power, much of which had been lost to municipal governments.

Lastly in 1994, with the Agreement on the Establishment of the Commission to Clarify Past Human Rights Violations and Acts of Violence the two parties committed to the creation of a Clarification Commission dedicated to investigating possible crimes throughout the entirety of the Guatemalan Armed Conflict, up to the final peace accords. This commission was not given any legal power but was instead expected to collect information and give recommendations to address human rights violations resulting from the conflict.

On March 31, 1995, representatives of the Guatemalan government and the URNG met again in Mexico and signed The Agreement on the Identity and Rights of Indigenous People. Later that year, the ASC and serious efforts became stagnated due to a change in focus towards upcoming elections.

== Peace process under Álvaro Arzú ==
Later in 1995, democratic elections were held and the candidate of the National Advancement Party (PAN), Álvaro Arzú, won the presidency to the populist runner-up Alfonso Portillo. When Ramiro de León Carpio completed Serrano Elías's term on January 14, 1996, Álvaro Arzú was sworn in as president.

Since Álvaro Arzú's presidency accelerated the peace process between the government of Guatemala and the URNG for several reasons. Mainly, the absent ties between him and the military, and pressures from the international community and the business community in the country allowed for productive negotiations for peace. As part of the president's commitments towards peace, he appointed Gustavo Porras Castejón, a former leader of the Ejército Guerrillero de los Pobres (EGP), which was affiliated with the URNG, as the president of the country's Peace Commission (COPAZ). Under this organization, the URNG and the government continued constant peace talks and signed a series of agreements leading up to the final peace accord.

In May, 1996, representatives of the two groups met in Mexico and signed the Agreement on Socio-Economic Aspects and the Agrarian Situation. This agreement concerned the economic model and structure of the country and targeted four areas: Democratisation and Participatory Development, Social Development, Agrarian Situation and Rural Development, and Modernization of Government Services and Fiscal Policy.

Later that year, in September, they signed the Agreement on the Strengthening of Civil Power and the Function of the Army in a Democratic Society, which had the main goal of establishing a stable democracy and moving the country away from the previous prevalence of authoritarian military rule. In these efforts, it also created several primary organizations such as Guatemala's Civil National Police (PNC).

These two agreements then led to the final agreements in the last month before the final peace accord. These included the Agreements on a Definitive Ceasefire, Constitutional Reforms and the Electoral Regime, the Basis for Legal integration of the URNG, the Law of National Reconciliation, and the Implementation, Compliance, and Verification Timetable for the Peace Agreements.

This last one was signed in Guatemala City together with the Agreement for a Firm and Lasting Peace on December 29, 1996. This signaled the legal culmination of the Guatemalan internal armed conflict after thirty-six years.

== Accord for a Firm and Lasting Peace 1996 ==
Signed on December 29, 1996, this final Accord officiated the implementation of the peace agreements signed under the Framework Agreement in the previous 10 years of attempted negotiations.

=== Document structure ===
The legal document is divided into four main sections. First, it outlines a list of concepts addressed throughout the peace process and decided upon in the final agreement. In the second section, it explicitly establishes the implementation of 10 accords previously signed by the URNG and Guatemalan governments. These 10 are as follows:

- The Comprehensive Agreement on Human Rights
- The Agreement on Resettlement of the Population Groups Uprooted by the Armed Conflict
- The Agreement on the Establishment of the Commission to Clarify Past Human Rights Violations and Acts of Violence
- The Agreement on the Identity and Rights of Indigenous People
- The Agreement on Socio-Economic Aspects and the Agrarian Situation
- The Agreement on the Strengthening of Civil Power and the Function of the Army in a Democratic Society
- The Agreement on a Definitive Ceasefire
- The Agreement on Constitutional Reforms and the Electoral Regime
- The Agreement on the Basis for Legal integration of the URNG
- The Agreement on the Implementation, Compliance, and Verification Timetable for the Peace Agreements

The third section recognizes the support and role of entities such as the ASC, the United Nations, and the countries part of the Group of Friends to the Guatemalan Peace Process.

Lastly, the fourth section establishes the validity of the Firm and Lasting Peace document as soon as it is signed and states that the document's means and goals would be widely announced, especially through official education programs.

The agreement was then signed by representatives of the government of Guatemala, the URNG, and the United Nations. Representatives included Raquel Zelaya.

=== Public response ===
The signing of a final peace agreement was greatly expected by the Guatemalan population. Thousands of people attended this signing ceremony, which was held in front of the National Palace and projected on large screens in the main square. The accords were well anticipated and agreed upon by Guatemalans, as the population was eager for an end to the thirty-six years of war. However, there was hesitation due to expected failure in the implementation of the accords. A poll conducted by Prensa Libre, a national newspaper, showed that 78% of respondents agreed with the accords but only 38% believed these peace negotiations "would be respected".

Although the leading leftist group, URNG, signed the final peace accords with the government of Guatemala, not all smaller branches fighting under the URNG were satisfied with the agreements. The Organization of People in Arms (ORPA) stated that they did not agree completely with the accords signed by the URNG on December 29, 1996. As a demonstration of this disagreement, they refused to attend a reconciliation ceremony in Quetzaltenango, Guatemala. However, this did not impede the end of the war in the country.

=== Challenges of implementation ===
The general language of the peace accords and the lack of representation of several Guatemalan groups caused challenges of implementation in the years following the signing of peace. Although the peace agreement was the start to establish significant changes to Guatemala, many problems in the country have thwarted progress in several areas. Major problems have stemmed from the corruption, bureaucracy, and self-interest prevalent in political positions in the country.

A problematic characteristic of this country is the extreme poverty and inequality among the population. Most of the country's population is indigenous, and have the lowest levels of education and live in the highest levels of poverty. Although the accords acknowledged the historical vulnerability and exploitation of this group, it did not outline effectively specific approaches to aid these people. This has allowed the continuation of a separated and racist society unable to collaborate with each other.

Another challenge has been the implementation of accords concerning land conflicts. Illegal occupations of land have continued and the government has not been able to address them so as to create a deterrent factor. The head of the governmental institution designated to deal with these cases resigned on the basis that they were not given the resources necessary to accomplish needed results. This, along with vague guidelines in the peace accords, has been problematic in the reincorporation of displaced populations and has not benefited the large rural and poor populations in the country.

Another characteristic promised by the accords that have failed to be accomplished or implemented properly is the topic of security in the country. The Civil National Police force, created after the war in compliance with peace agreements, is ill-trained and corrupt. In has proved unable to fight against organized crime or collaborate in prosecutions against human rights crimes. In addition, the government has also caused insecurity and distrust by being involved in corruption and defraudation cases.

The country has also found it difficult to comply with agreed targets in the areas of social welfare and tax legislation. Although the government promised to invest more money in education and healthcare budgets, it has not complied with its initial targets. In addition, as promised, in 1998 the government passed a law increasing taxes but repealed it after civil protests, and did not pursue any further changes.

Furthermore, there was significant pressure from international entities who had contributed resources and money to the peace process, many of which were conditional on the right implementation of established accords. Therefore, the challenges and inability to comply with parts of the peace accords has led to budget cuts that further complicate the fulfillment of promised changes.

=== Aftermath ===
Although the country has not fully implemented the 1996 peace accords, the civil war did not continue. However, there have been many accusations of human rights violations that have been faced with high levels of impunity for members involved. Cases of people "disappeared" by the military in the armed conflict have gone unsolved and families continue to look for justice, in many cases to no avail. In May 2013, the former Guatemalan President, Efrain Rios Montt, was found guilty of coordinating the killing of nearly 1,800 indigenous Ixil Maya from 1982 to 1983. Cases of people "disappeared" by the military in the armed conflict have gone unsolved and families continue to look for justice. In addition, there are still ideological frictions in the country that have created tensions among the population and psychological effects that have affected the country's progress.

== See also ==
- 1998 Belize heist – allegedly connected to this accord
