= San Román, Orange Walk =

Coordinates: 18.192°N 88.643°W

San Román, also known as San Román Rio Hondo, is a village located in the Orange Walk District in Belize. The population of the village consists mostly of Yucatec Mayan descendants. San Roman Rio Hondo is known for having a 100-year-old church.

The population was 438 in the 2010 census.
