= San Jose Palmar =

- Location within Belize
- Coordinates: 18°0′51″N 88°32′33″W
- Country: Belize
- District: Orange Walk District
- Constituency: Orange Walk East
- Time zone: UTC-6 (Central)
- Climate: Aw

San Jose Palmar is a village in the Orange Walk District of the nation of Belize. The official name of the village is San Jose "Nuevo" Palmar. The village has a unique and colorful history that dates back to the colonial era. The village was first settled on October 12, 1936 after the settlers were being relocated from their original village San Jose in the Yalbac Hills of Belize. The village was settled by some 200 inhabitants from the Yucatec Maya ethnicity who came originally from San Jose Viejo. Today this settlement has grown to approximately two thousand five hundred inhabitants. The village is about five minutes drive from the center of Orange Walk Town. The village is located about two miles south east from downtown Orange Walk. Its first chairperson, also known as "alcalde", was Maximo Perez. Today the newly elected chairperson is Orlando Balam, a native of the village.
