= Anthony Chanona =

Belizean politician

Anthony Chanona Arce is a Belizean politician for the People's United Party.

He was elected the first Mayor of Belmopan in 2000, re-elected in 2003, and opted not to run for a third term, leaving office in 2006; while in office, he handed the keys of the city to Chen Shui-bian, President of the Republic of China. Simeon López succeeded him as mayor.

Chanona was appointed to the Senate in April 2006, holding the position until his resignation on September 13, 2007, over the issue of the passage of the Public Utilities Act (which he had opposed on the grounds that it diminished the autonomy of the Public Utilities Commission). David Hoy was appointed to fill Chanona's seat in November of that year. In March 2022, his eldest daughter Janelle became a member of parliament, having been elected by non-governmental organizations to serve as their representative in the Senate.

Chanona was also formerly chairman of the Belize Citrus Growers Association (CGA). He and several members of his family were among the hundreds of victims of the May 2, 1998 Hummingbird Highway robbery.
