= Slavery in Belize =

Slavery in Belize includes practices of enslavement by British colonists during the period of European colonization. Products for which slavery was used include logwood, mahogany and sugar.

British settlers, called Baymen, began importing African slaves in the early 18th century. Some slaves were allowed their own plantations, while others had to depend on their owner's rations. The Baymen reluctantly allowed slaves to participate in the Battle of St. George's Caye against the Spanish and their slaves. In some cases they faced former slaves who had run away or been taken in by the Spaniards. Great Britain ended slavery in the colony in 1838. Initially the planters refused to sell land to freedmen. But Belizean slaveowners received the highest compensation, of more than 50 pounds, for selling plots of emancipated territories.

== 1724–1825 ==
Cutting logwood was a simple, small-scale operation, but the settlers imported slaves to help with the work. Slavery in the settlement was associated with the extraction of timber, first logwood and then mahogany, as treaties forbade the production of plantation crops. This difference in economic function gave rise to variations in the organization, conditions, and treatment of slaves. The earliest reference to African slaves in the British settlement appeared in a 1724 Spanish missionary's account, which stated that the British recently had been importing them from Jamaica and Bermuda. In the second half of the eighteenth century the slave population hovered around 3,000, making up about three-quarters of the total population. Most slaves, even if they were brought through West Indian markets, were born in Africa, probably from around the Bight of Biafra, the Congo, and Angola—the principal sources of British slaves in the late 18th century. The Eboe (Ibo) seem to have been particularly numerous; one section of Belize Town was known as Eboe Town in the first half of the 19th century. At first, many slaves maintained African ethnic identifications and cultural practices. Gradually, however, the process of assimilation was creating a new, synthetic Creole culture.

Whites, although a minority in the settlement, monopolized power and wealth by dominating the chief economic activities. trade and timber. They also controlled the first legislature and the judicial and administrative institutions. As a result, British settlers had a disproportionate influence on the development of the Creole culture. Anglican, Baptist, and Methodist missionaries helped devalue and suppress African cultural heritage.

Cutting timber was seasonal work that required workers to spend several months isolated in temporary makeshift camps in the forest, away from families in Belize Town. Settlers needed only one or two slaves to cut logwood, a small tree that grows in clumps near the coast. But as the trade shifted to mahogany in the last quarter of the 18th century, the settlers needed more money, land, and slaves for larger-scale operations. After 1770 about 80 percent of all male slaves aged ten years or more cut timber. Huntsmen found the trees, which were then cut, trimmed, and hauled to the riverside. During the rainy season, settlers and slaves floated rafts of untrimmed logs downriver, where the wood was processed for shipment. Huntsmen were highly skilled and valued slaves, as were the axmen who cut the trees while standing on a springy platform four to five meters high. Another group of slaves cared for the oxen that pulled the huge logs to the river. Others trimmed the trees and cleared the tracks. The use of small gangs of slaves for cutting wood reduced the need for close supervision; whip-wielding slavedrivers, who were ubiquitous on large plantations elsewhere, were unknown in the settlement.

The colonial masters used domestic slaves, mostly women and children, to clean their houses, sew, wash and iron their clothes, prepare and serve their food, and raise their children. Some slaves cultivated provisions that would either be sold or used to save their owners some of the cost of importing food. Other slaves worked as sailors, blacksmiths, nurses, and bakers. Few slaves, however, held jobs requiring a high level of skill. Young people started work by waiting on their masters' tables, where they were taught to obey, then most of the young women continued in domestic work while the young men became woodcutters. This rigid division of labor and the narrow range of work experience of most slaves limited their opportunities after legal emancipation in 1838.

The slaves' experience, though different from that on plantations in other colonies in the region, was nevertheless oppressive. They were frequently the objects of "extreme inhumanity", as a report published in 1820 stated. The settlement's chaplain reported "instances, many instances, of horrible barbarity" against the slaves. The slaves' own actions, including suicide, abortion, murder, escape, and revolt, suggest how they viewed their situation. Slaves who lived in small, scattered, and remote groups could escape with relative ease if they were willing to leave their families. In the 18th century, many escaped to Yucatán, and in the early 19th century a steady flow of runaways went to Guatemala and down the coast to Honduras. Some runaways established communities, such as one near Sibun River, that offered refuge to others. When freedom could be attained by slipping into the bush, revolt was not such a pressing option. Nevertheless, numerous slave revolts took place. The last revolt in 1820, led by two black slaves, Blacker and Blackest, involved a considerable number of well-armed individuals who "had been treated with very unnecessary harshness by their Owner, and had certainly good grounds for complaint."

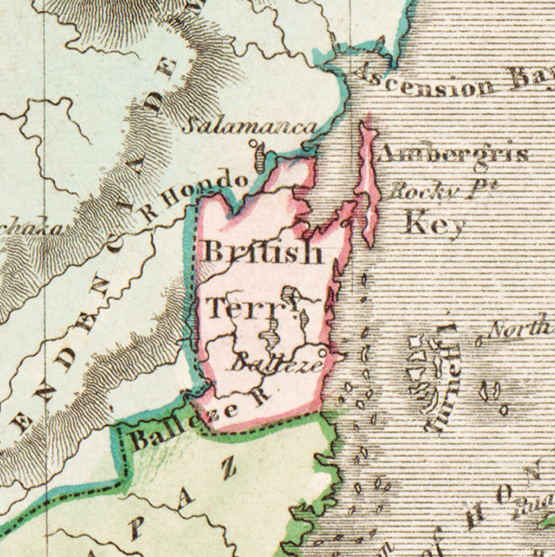
Detail of Belize from Daniel Lizars' 1831 map

One way the settler minority maintained its control was by dividing the slaves from the growing population of free Creole people who were given limited privileges. Though some Creoles were legally free, they could neither hold commissions in the military nor act as jurors or magistrates, and their economic activities were restricted. They could vote in elections only if they had owned more property and lived in the area longer than whites. Privileges, however, led many free blacks to stress their loyalty and acculturation to British ways. When officials in other colonies of the British West Indies began giving free blacks expanded legal rights, the Colonial Office threatened to dissolve the Baymen's Public Meeting unless it followed suit. The "Coloured Subjects of Free Condition" were granted civil rights on July 5, 1831, a few years before the abolition of slavery was completed.

The essence of society, a rigidly hierarchical system in which people were ranked according to race and class was well established by the time of full emancipation in 1838. The act to abolish slavery throughout the British colonies, passed in 1833, was intended to avoid drastic social changes by effecting emancipation over a five-year transition period. The act included two generous measures for slave owners: a system of "apprenticeship" calculated to extend their control over the former slaves who were to continue to work for their masters without pay, and compensation for the former slave owners for their loss of property. These measures helped ensure that the majority of the population, even when it was legally freed after apprenticeship ended in 1838, depended on their former owners for work. These owners still monopolized the land. Before 1838, a handful of the inhabitants controlled the settlement and owned most of the people. After 1838, the masters of the settlement, a tiny elite, continued to control the country for over a century by denying access to land, and by promoting economic dependency of the freed slaves through a combination of wage advances and company stores.

There were three major slave revolts in Belize. These slave revolts occurred in 1765, 1768 and 1773 being the largest which ended in the death of 6 British men and lasted 5 months.
