= George Price Highway =

Highway in Belize

- Western Highway
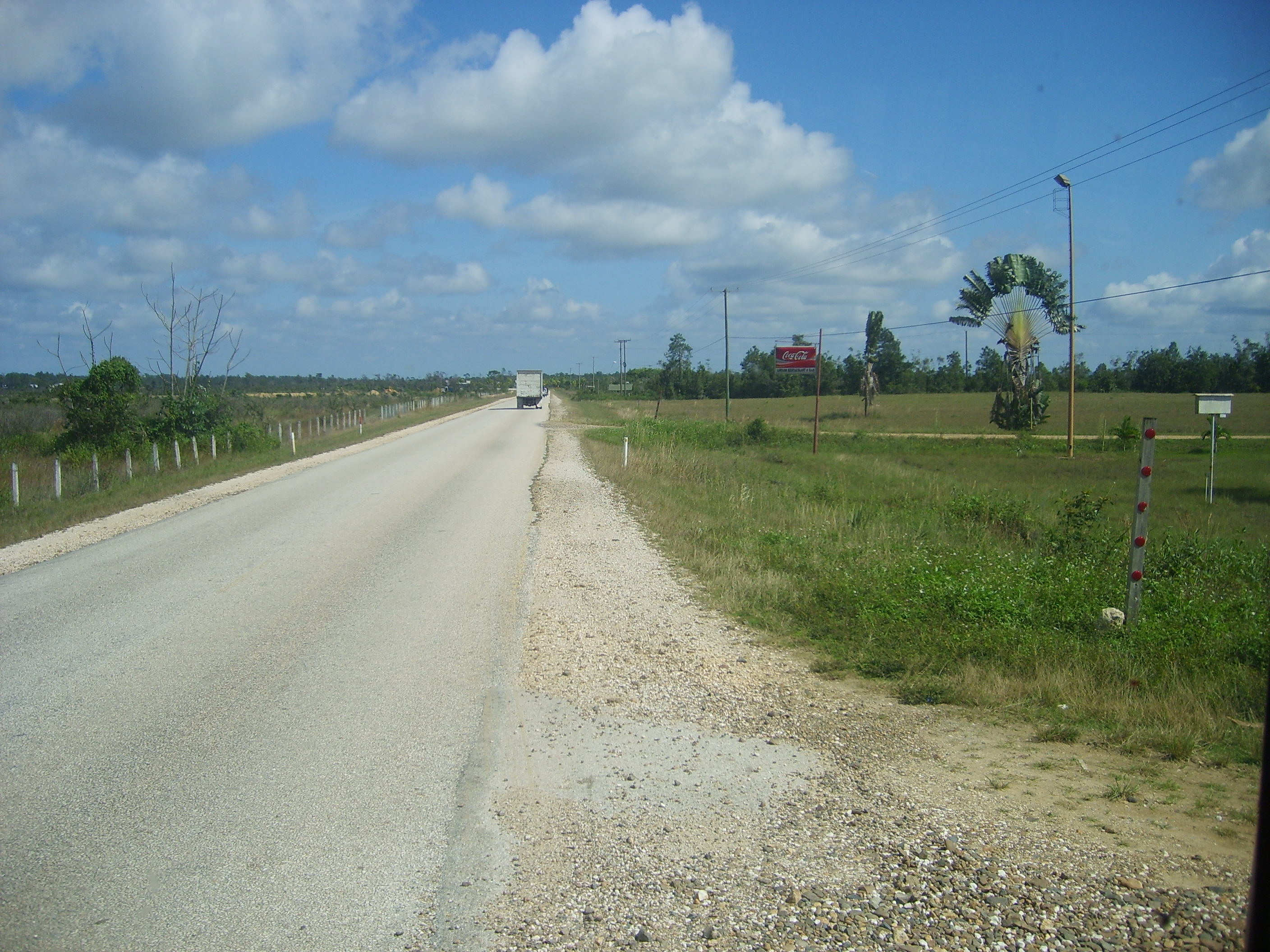
- George Price Highway between San Ignacio and Belmopan

Route information
- Length: 77.2 mi (124.2 km)

Major junctions
- From: Belize City
- To: Benque Viejo

Location
- Country: Belize

Highway system
- Roads in Belize

The George Price Highway is one of four main highways in Belize. It originates in Belize City, runs west through Hattieville, the Belize Zoo, the capital city of Belmopan (northern outskirts), San Ignacio, San José Succotz (across the river from Xunantunich archaeological site) and terminates at the Guatemalan border at Benque Viejo. The highway bisects the country and ties the eastern and western parts of Belize together. A new steel bridge over Beaver Dam Creek was constructed to replace the broken concrete one.

The highway was built in the 1930s and was originally known as the Western Highway. It was renamed the George Price Highway in 2012, after the late former prime minister who led the country to independence in 1981.

== History ==
A long bridge was constructed over the narrowest part of the Sibun Swamp, 49.15 chains in length on the Western Road, so as to avoid a detour of eight miles and the crossing of the Belize River twice. This bridge fell into disrepair about the middle of 1887, and wasn't replaced.

In 1885 the survey of a main road, to run southward, parallel with the coast, about ten miles inland, was undertaken, with the object of opening up communication with Crown lands up to then inaccessible; but owing to restricted funds, no attempt was made to complete this important undertaking.

2003, September 20. The Beaver Dam Creek Bridge was reconstructed as a new steel bridge to replace the old broken concrete bridge.

2012, September 20. The Western Highway was renamed the George Price Highway in honour of George Price.

2016, July. A new roundabout was constructed at the junction of the George Price Highway and the Hummingbird Highway.

2020, March 20. The Roaring Creek Bridge was reconstructed due to the old bridge being too narrow and getting congested.

== Junction list ==
| District | Mile | km | Destination | Notes |
|---|---|---|---|---|
| Belize | 0.0 | 0.0 | Central American Boulevard to Northern Highway and Cemetery Road | Elevation, 2 metres |
| Belize | 1.6 | 2.6 | Faber Road | Marks approximate western edge of Belize City; elevation, 8 metres |
| Belize | 14.3 | 23.1 | Burrell Boom Road | 19.1 km to Northern Highway; elevation, 6 metres |
| Belize | 15.9 | 25.6 | Junction | Access to Hattieville |
| Belize | 29.1 | 46.9 | Coastal Highway (Manatee Highway) | Near La Democracia, Belize District; Coastal Highway extends 57 km to join Hummingbird Highway near Dangriga; elevation, 32 metres |
| Cayo | 46.3 | 74.6 | Access road to Belmopan airstrip | Elevation, 54 metres |
| Cayo | 47.2 | 76.0 | Hummingbird Highway | Access to city of Belmopan; elevation, 43 metres |
| Cayo | 62.1 | 99.9 | Chiquibul Road | Elevation, 80 metres |
| Cayo | 68.5 | 110.3 | Bridge over Belize River | Highway enters San Ignacio; elevation, 62 metres |
| Cayo | 77.2 | 124.3 | Guatemala border | Elevation, 87 metres |
