= Douglas, Belize =

Douglas
- Location within Belize
- Coordinates: 18°14′15″N 88°36′06″W
- Country: Belize
- District: Orange Walk District
- Time zone: UTC-6 (Central)
- Climate: Am

Douglas is a village situated by the Rio Hondo river in Orange Walk District, Belize, 12 miles from Orange Walk Town. According to the 2010 census, there were 122 households in Douglas with a population of 521 people, 270 males and 250 females consisting mostly from people of Maya Mestizo (Yucatec Maya) descent.
