= Coastal Highway (Belize) =

Highway in eastern Belize

- Manuel Esquivel Highway
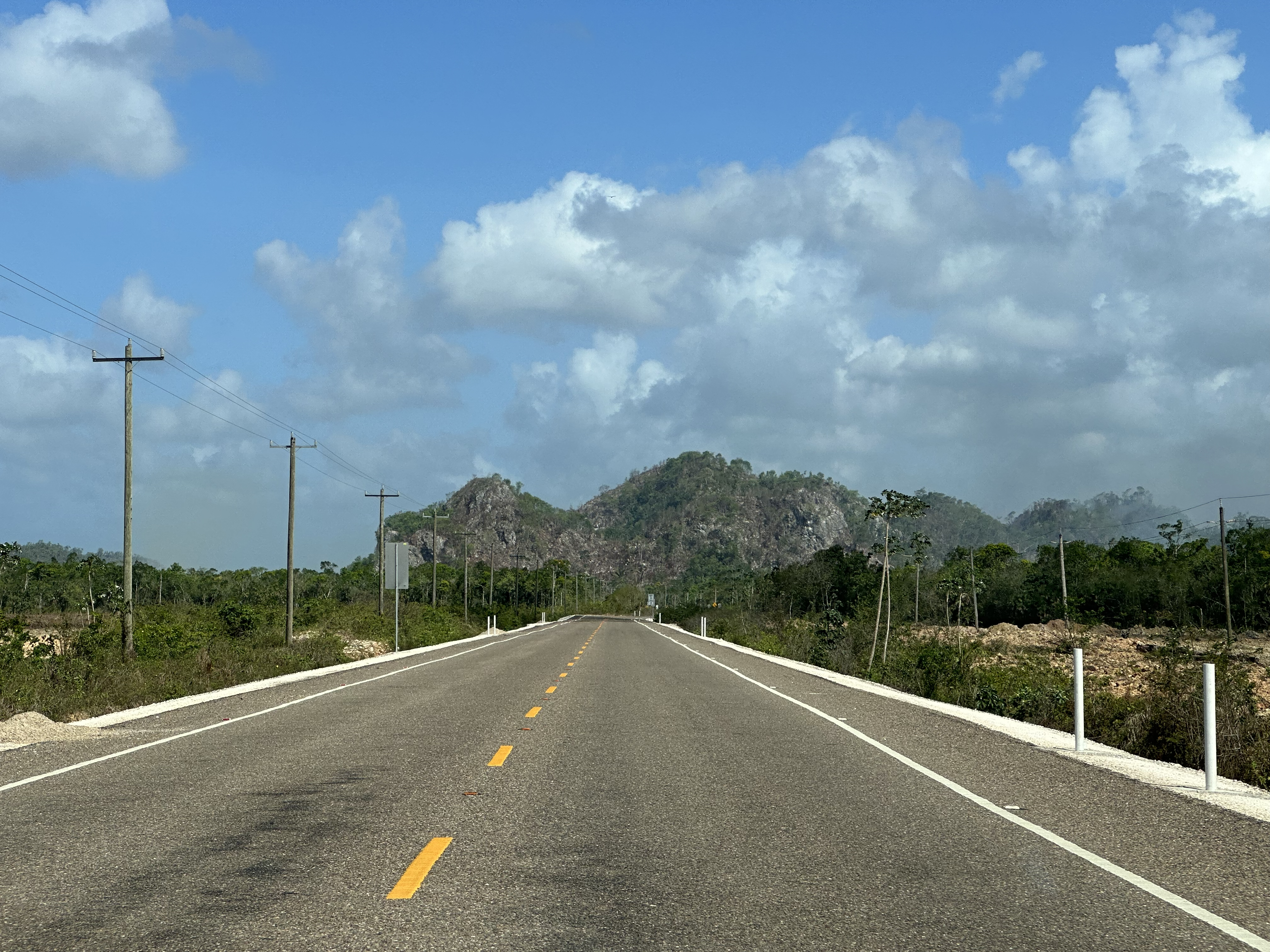
- The Coastal Highway near MP 4, travelling south from La Democracia

Route information
- Length: 36.17 mi (58.21 km)

Major junctions
- From: George Price Highway in La Democracia, Belize District
- To: Hummingbird Highway in Hope Creek, Stann Creek District

Location
- Country: Belize
- Villages: Mullins River, Gales Point

Highway system
- Roads in Belize

The Coastal Highway is a major highway in eastern Belize. It runs from the George Price Highway in La Democracia, Belize District south to the Hummingbird Highway in Hope Creek, Stann Creek District. This is a distance of 36.17 miles (58.21 km).

As of September 23, 2020, the highway's official name is the Manuel Esquivel Highway, named for Sir Manuel Amadeo Esquivel, the former Prime Minister of Belize and leader of the United Democratic Party. Locally, it is also known as the Shortcut, as the Coastal Highway shortens the route from Belize City to Dangriga by 29.1 miles (46.8 km), and was largely utilized by large trucks avoiding the extra distance on the George Price Highway and Hummingbird Highway via Belmopan.

Before being renamed, the highway was known as the Manatee Highway, named for the Manatee Forest Reserve that lies to the west of the road.

== Route description ==
The Coastal Highway begins at a junction with the George Price Highway in La Democracia. It then runs southeast through remote and lightly-populated rural areas, before turning east to round Sugar Valley Hill.

After the hill, the highway turns south to serve the villages of Mullins River and Gale Point before terminating at a roundabout with the Hummingbird Highway in Hope Creek. This roundabout was constructed as part of the 2016-2023 Coastal Highway project.

For its entire length, the Coastal Highway is paved with asphalt and features 4 feet (1.2 m)-wide paved shoulders, with an additional unpaved margin. The speed limit ranges from as high as 55 miles per hour (89 km/h) in wide open areas, to 30 miles per hour (48 km/h) on tighter curves, which also feature guardrails. At major intersections and near settlements, advanced rumble strips and speed bumps accompany a reduction in speed to 25 miles per hour (40 km/h) or less.

Mile markers are posted every mile, increasing from La Democracia to Hope Creek.

== History ==
The Coastal Highway's surface was originally constructed from gravel or dirt and frequently washed out during the rainy season. Some bridges were constructed from wood and were wide enough to allow only one vehicle at a time.

Starting in 2016, the government of Belize developed a plan to upgrade the road to a bituminous surface. The Caribbean Development Bank provided a BZ$73.2 million (US$36.6 million) loan, while the United Kingdom Caribbean Infrastructure Partnership Fund granted BZ$68 million (US$34 million). The Government of Belize provided BZ$17.2 million (US$8.6 million). The total cost of the project was BZ$158.4 million (US$79.2 million). Six new bridges were built, with four additional bridges rehabilitated.

Politecnica, an engineering firm based in Modena, Italy provided technical designs in 2018-2019 for the project. Contracts for the construction were awarded to Imer Hernandez Development Company Limited, and construction began on February 24, 2020. The project was completed in 2024.
