= La Democracia, Belize =

La Democracia
- Location in Belize
- Coordinates: 17°20′00″N 88°33′00″W
- Country: Belize
- District: Belize District
- Constituency: Belize Rural Central
- Climate: Am

La Democracia is a populated settlement located in the nation of Belize. It is a mainland village that is located in Belize District.

It is the location of Belize's zoo and tropical education center. It is also the location of the Georgeville lumber branch. It is near the provincial border of Belize District and Cayo District. The Monkey Bay Wildlife Sanctuary is close to La Democracia.

== Demographics ==
At the time of the 2010 census, La Democracia had a population of 353. Of these, 50.1% were Creole, 29.5% Mestizo, 11.0% Mixed, 3.1% Ketchi Maya, 2.0% Garifuna, 1.4% East Indian, 1.1% Caucasian, 1.1% Mopan Maya, 0.3% Yucatec Maya and 0.3% Mennonite.
