= Yo Creek =

Village of Orange Walk District, Belize

Coordinates: 18.092°N 88.640°W

Yo Creek is a small village located in the Orange Walk District of the nation of Belize, consisting mainly of people of Yucatec Maya descent. The name Yo Creek comes from the combination of the Maya word yo which means "top" and the English word creek. Most Yo Creek residents speak Spanish and English very well, while the elders still speak their Maya language. Yo Creek is well known for cultural programs to preserve the Maya Yucatec culture. The village is also known for their Poktapok Maya ball game team Ek' Balam which means in the Yucatec Maya language Black Jaguars who won the championship in El Mundo Maya mundial de PoktaPok 2017.
