= Orange Walk District =

Northwestern district of Belize

Coordinates: 17°50′N 88°50′W

- District
- Country: Belize
- Capital: Orange Walk Town

Area
  - Total: 4,737 km^{2} (1,829 sq mi)

Population (2024 estimate)
  - Total: 55,622
  - Density: 11.74/km^{2} (30.41/sq mi)

Ethnic groups (2022 census)
  - Hispanic/ Mestizo: 79.8%
  - Mennonite: 10.8%
  - Creole: 6.3%
  - Mayan: 0.7% (Note: 0.3% Kʼicheʼ, 0.2% Mopan, 0.2% Yucatec)
  - Garifuna: 0.6%
  - Chinese: 0.3%
  - East Indian: 0.3%
  - White: 0.2%
  - Indian: 0.1%
  - Other: 0.4%

Languages spoken (2022 census)
  - Spanish: 77.6%
  - English: 66.6%
  - Creole: 15.9%
  - German: 6.2% (Note: Includes speakers of both Plautdietsch and Standard German)
  - Mayan: 0.7% (Note: 0.3% Yucatec, 0.2% Qʼeqchiʼ, 0.1% Mopan)
  - Chinese: 0.4%
  - Garifuna: 0.3%
  - Hindi: 0.1%
  - Other: 3.1%
- ISO 3166 code: BZ-OW
- Website: www.orangewalk.com

Orange Walk is a district in the northwest of the nation of Belize, with its district capital in Orange Walk Town.

== Demographics ==
=== Main settlements ===
The Orange Walk District, with an area of 1,829 square miles (4,636 square km), is located north-northwest of the Belize District. This is the second largest district in terms of total area in comparison to other districts in Belize, and lies between the Belize and Corozal districts to the east, Mexico to the north and Guatemala to the west. Villages in Orange Walk District include August Pine Ridge, Blue Creek, Carmelita, Chan Pine Ridge, Douglas, Indian Church, Guinea Grass, San Antonio, San Carlos, San Estevan, San Felipe, San José, San Jose Palmar, Nuevo San Juan, San Lazaro, San Luis, San Pablo, San Román, Santa Cruz, Santa Martha, Shipyard, Trial Farm, Trinidad and Yo Creek. Other settlements with smaller numbers of inhabitants may also be found, as well as ancient Mayan sites such as Cuello, Lamanai, Noh Mul and Chan Chich. The Rio Bravo Conservation and Management Area, a large private nature reserve in the Yalbac Hills, is also located in this district. The land is highly cultivated with sugar cane, sorghum, rice, corn and vegetables, with a significant amount of this agriculture done by Mennonite farmers.

According to the Statistical Institute of Belize, the Orange Walk District had an estimated population of 45,419 persons for the 2010 population and housing census; 13,400 of these persons lived in the urban area of Orange Walk Town while 32,019 lived in rural areas.

=== Ethnicity ===
Ethnicity
| Ethnicity | 2010 | | 2022 | |
| % | Number | % | Number | % |
|---|---|---|---|---|
| Mestizo | 34,616 | 77.26% | 43,236 | 79.84% |
| European: * German (Mennonite) * British (Anglo-Celtic) | 4,950; 4,852; 98 | 11.05% 10.83% 0.22% | 5,921; 5,831; 90 | 10.94% 10.77% 0.17% |
| Creole | 2,402 | 5.36% | 3,412 | 6.30% |
| Garifuna | 262 | 0.58% | 311 | 0.57% |
| Qʼeqchi Maya | 72 | 0.16% | 188 | 0.34% |
| Chinese/Asian | 344 | 0.77% | 170 | 0.31% |
| East Indian | 159 | 0.35% | 163 | 0.30% |
| Yucatec Maya | 164 | 0.37% | 109 | 0.20% |
| Mopan Maya | 237 | 0.53% | 105 | 0.19% |
| Other | 243 | 0.54% | 281 | 0.52% |
| Not stated | – | – | 257 | 0.47% |
| Mixed | 1,355 | 2.98% | – | – |
| Total | 44,804 | 100% | 54,152 | 100% |

=== Language ===
In the Orange Walk District, Spanish, Kriol and English are the most spoken languages. The Mennonite community, which is almost 11% of the district's population, speaks primarily a German dialect, called Plautdietsch. In many villages Yucatec Maya is still spoken by elders.

== Economy ==
The capital of the district is Orange Walk Town, with an estimated population of 13,400. The district is home to mostly Maya mestizo descendants of Mexican refugees who fled from the 1840 Caste War. The district's main economic base is drawn from agriculture, with sugar cane being the primary crop. This is slowly being replaced by a combination of alternative crops such potatoes, onions and soya beans. Orange Walk is also important for its production of dairy products, citrus fruits, beef and rum production.

Another emerging industry is tourism due to healthy populations of tropical wildlife and the rich archaeological sites now coming to light. There are over 400 recorded bird species in the district, making Orange Walk a birdwatcher's paradise. Several settlements in the district are also home to conservative German speaking Mennonites. The district is also the home of two rivers, the Rio Hondo, which also forms part of the border with Mexico, and the New River, which has as its source Belize's largest body of water, the New River Lagoon.

== History ==
Industry in Orange Walk was previously dominated by logging for over a hundred years until the refugees of the Caste War arrived in the late 19th century. At the time of logging, all the timber was floated down the New River into the Corozal Bay, then to Belize City and shipped abroad. At the time of the arrival of the Caste War refugees, the logging industry was in decline and eventually the sugar industry was established. There has been evidence that some Yucatec Maya were still living in a remote area of Yalbac hills of the district when the British arrived in the Orange walk District.

Although the Orange Walk District has no coast because it is locked inland, it boasts the remains of two forts, Forts Mundy and Cairns, built by soldiers of the British Honduras West India Regiment. The forts were built in the 19th century after battles between earlier Mayan inhabitants of the district, most notably Marcus Canul and his Icaiche Indians, and settlers.

== Political divisions ==
Politically, Orange Walk is divided into 4 constituencies, three currently under the People's United Party (PUP) and one under the United Democratic Party (UDP).

- Orange Walk Central: Orange Walk Central generally includes the vicinity of Orange Walk Town and the village of San Estevan. Since 1993, this seat has been held by the PUP's John Briceno. Briceno was re-elected in the 2015 elections.
- Orange Walk East: Orange Walk East includes the eastern area of Orange Walk Town and the easternmost villages in the district, particularly San Jose Palmar, Chan Pine Ridge, Tower Hill, Carmelita and Santa Martha. Elodio Aragon of the UDP won this seat in the 2015 elections.
- Orange Walk North: Gaspar Vega won this seat for the UDP in the 2015 elections. The area includes the Otro Benque area of Orange Walk Town and the villages of Trial Farm, San Jose, San Pablo, Douglas, San Roman, San Luis, Nuevo San Juan, San Antonio and Santa Cruz.
- Orange Walk South: Orange Walk South contains the villages of San Lazaro, Yo Creek, Trinidad, August Pine Ridge, San Felipe, Guinea Grass, Blue Creek, Shipyard and a number of other villages. Jose Abelardo Mai for the PUP is the recently elected area representative in the 2015 elections.
