= Belize Central Prison =

Prison in Hattieville, Belize

Coordinates: 17.4788°N 88.4062°W

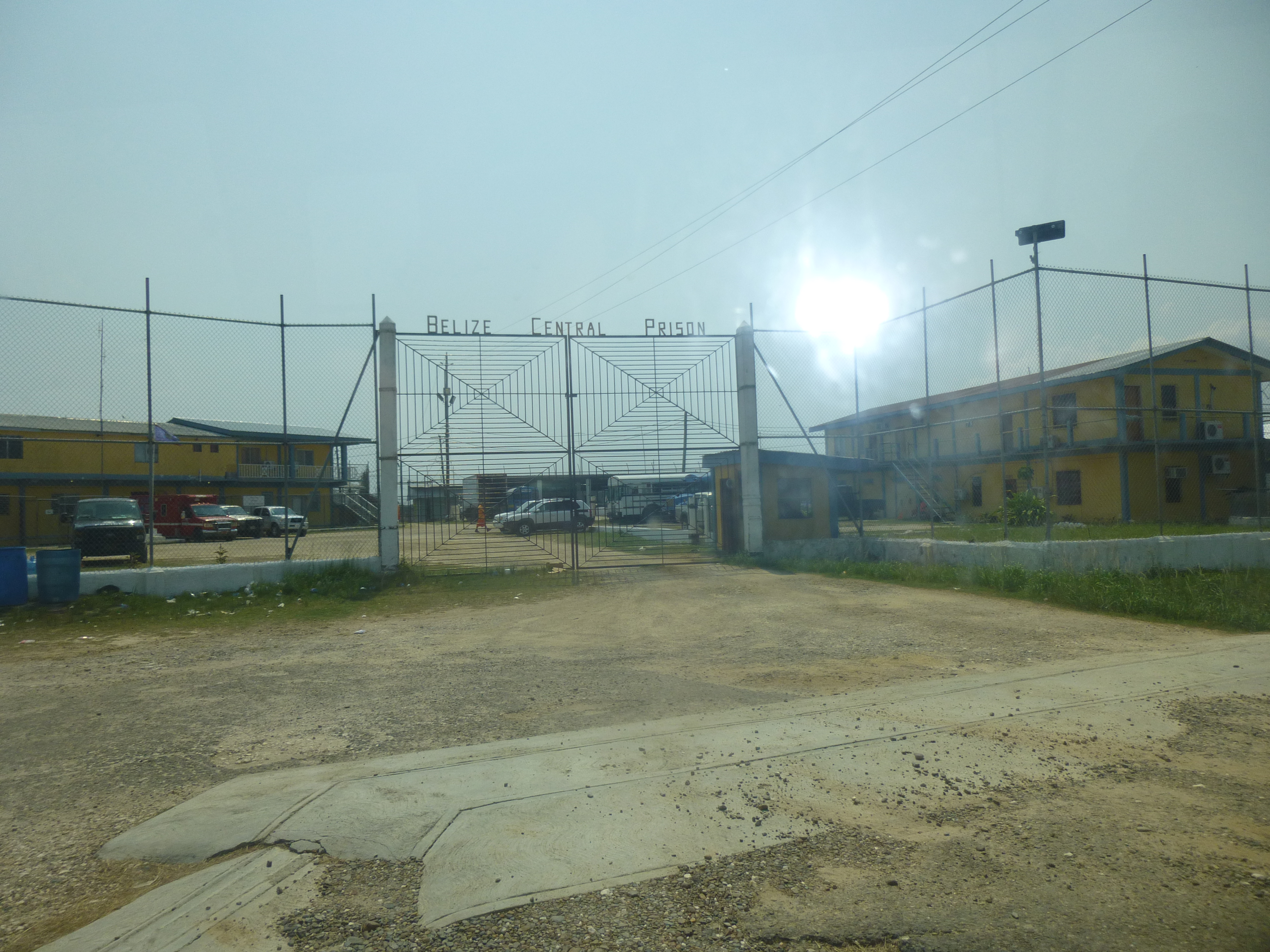
- Belize Central Prison front gate
- Interactive map of Belize Central Prison
- Location: Hattieville, Belize
- Population: 1,297 (2017)
- Former name: Hattieville Prison
- Managed by: Kolbe Foundation

Belize Central Prison is the sole correctional facility in the country of Belize, located in Hattieville. The Kolbe Foundation, a non-profit, non-governmental organization, has managed the prison since 2002.

It was formerly known as the Hattieville Prison. Its local nickname is the ‘Hattieville Ramada’. Officials established it as a replacement for a century-old prison that closed and later became the Belize Museum.

The prison houses men and women, and it houses adults and adjudicated youths.

As of August 12, 2008, the prison had 1,371 prisoners. In June 2017, the total population was 1,297, including pre-trial detainees (30.1%). Belize's incarceration rate is relatively high at 356/100,000. The incarceration rate for females has risen from 8.4 (per 100,000 of national population) in 2000 to 12.6 in 2017.

In 2013, researchers from the University of Indianapolis began a project recording the oral histories of staff and inmates at Belize Central Prison to document the historic shift in management from the state to the Kolbe Foundation. To date, the project has collected interviews with 36 staff and 24 female inmates. Initial findings from staff interviews suggest very much improved conditions, a shift in focus from punishment to rehabilitation, and a willingness to hire former offenders and even inmates of the prison. Lower levels of self-reported social distance between staff and inmates seems to be an important factor driving the increased focus on rehabilitation at the prison.

== Location, geography, and facilities ==
The prison is on a 225-acre (91 ha) plot of land at Mile 2 of Burrell Boom Road. The prison uses 150 acres (61 ha) of this land, with much of the acreage being used for farming and other activities. The main prison territory, located on 50-acre (20 ha) of land, is surrounded by a fence with a circumference of 1 mile (1.6 km).

The nearest major highway, Western Highway, is 2 miles (3.2 km) away from the prison. There is no public transportation between the Western Highway and the prison. Area taxi drivers do transport people to the prison for a fee. The Kolbe Foundation said "Quite a few people do the two mile walk and find it surprisingly enjoyable." The prison is 6 miles (9.7 km) from Burrell Boom and 17 miles (27 km) from Belize City.

== Facilities ==
- Addiction Rehabilitation Center (ARC)
- Wagner's Youth Facility (WYF)

== See also ==
- 2020 Belize prison escape – largest mass escape from this prison
