= Hattieville =

- Village
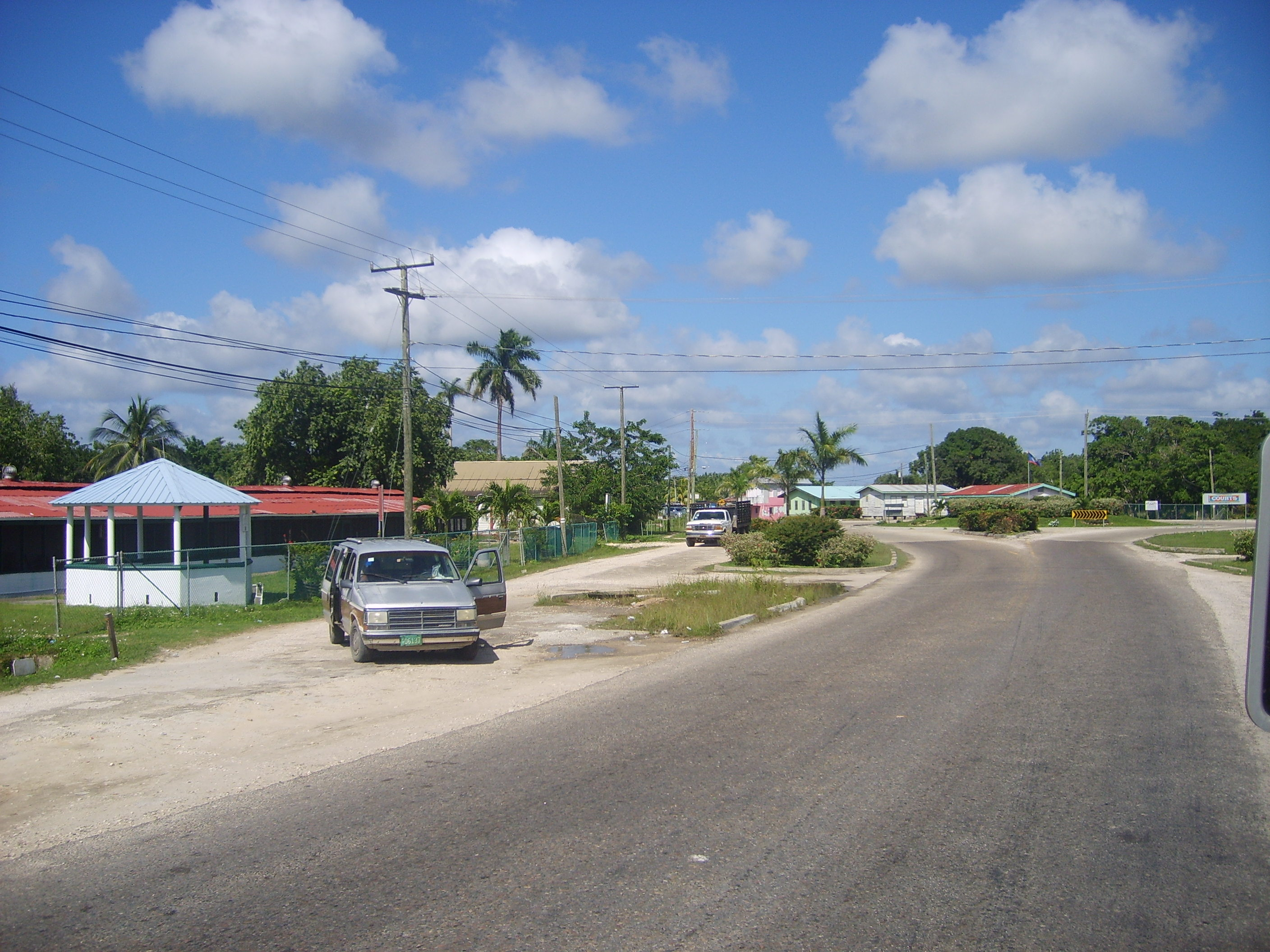
- View of the village

- Location in Belize
- Coordinates: 17°27′01″N 88°23′45″W
- Country: Belize
- District: Belize District
- Constituency: Belize Rural Central
- Elevation: 6.4 m (21 ft)

Population (2005)
  - Total: 1,300 (est.)
- Time zone: UTC-06:00 (CST)
- Climate: Am

Hattieville is a village in the Belize District of the nation of Belize. It is located at 17N 88W, at an elevation of 196 feet (60 meters) above mean sea level, and has a population of about 1,300 people. Hattieville was established as a refugee camp after Hurricane Hattie made many people homeless in Belize City when it hit in 1961, but it became a permanent town.

Operation New Horizons 2007 built two additional school rooms onto the Hattieville government school between 17 March - 12 May 2007. This mission was under the command of the Louisiana Army National Guard.

Belize Central Prison (formerly Hattieville Prison) is in Hattieville. It is the only prison in Belize.

== Demographics ==
At the time of the 2010 census, Hattieville had a population of 2,344. Of these, 73.7% were Creole, 9.8% Mixed, 8.2% Mestizo, 3.6% Garifuna, 1.4% East Indian, 1.2% Mopan Maya, 0.6% Ketchi Maya, 0.2% African, 0.1% Caucasian and 0.2% others.
