= Lists of most murders =

Wikimedia disambiguation page

Most murders may refer to:

== Countries with the most murders or most murders per unit population ==
- List of countries by intentional homicide rate – countries ranked by intentional homicides per 100,000 people, also sortable by annual number

== Subnational areas with the most murders per unit population ==
- List of cities by murder rate
- List of Brazilian states by murder rate
- List of Brazilian federative units by homicide rate
- List of Canadian provinces and territories by homicide rate
- List of Mexican states by homicides
- List of federal subjects of Russia by murder rate
- List of U.S. states by intentional homicide rate

== Most murders by a specific killer or group of killers ==
For categories of events or individuals responsible for the greatest number of murders:

- List of major terrorist incidents – terrorist attacks with the highest death tolls
- List of rampage killers – individuals who committed multiple murders in a single incident or spree
- List of rampage killers (workplace killings) – mass murders in workplace settings
- List of school massacres by death toll – school shootings and attacks ranked by number of fatalities
- List of serial killers by number of victims – serial killers ranked by confirmed or estimated victims

== Most murders by shooting, for a given country ==
For countries with notable numbers of mass shooting incidents, most include a table sortable by number of victims, including by number of deaths:

- List of mass shootings in Australia
- List of mass shootings in Austria
- List of mass shootings in Belgium
- List of mass shootings in Belize
- List of mass shootings in Bulgaria
- List of mass shootings in Canada
- List of mass shootings in Denmark
- List of mass shootings in Finland
- List of mass shootings in France
- List of mass shootings in Germany
- List of mass shootings in Italy
- List of mass shootings in Japan
- List of mass shootings in Kenya
- List of mass shootings in New Zealand
- List of mass shootings in Russia
- List of mass shootings in South Africa
- List of mass shootings in the Soviet Union
- List of mass shootings in Sweden
- List of mass shootings in Switzerland
- List of mass shootings in the United Kingdom
- List of mass shootings in the United States

== See also ==
- Genocide – the deliberate killing of a large number of people from a particular group
- Mass murder – the act of murdering many people, typically simultaneously or over a short period
