= Hyvinkää shooting =

2012 mass shooting in Finland

- Location: 60.629°N 24.858°E; Uudenmaankatu, Hyvinkää, Finland
- Date: 26 May 2012; 14 years ago ≈1:50 a.m. (UTC+02:00)
- Attack type: Mass shooting
- Weapons: .22 long rifle CZ 452-2E ZKM bolt-action rifle; .308-caliber SAKO L579 bolt-action rifle
- Deaths: 2
- Injuries: 7
- Perpetrator: Eero Hiltunen
- Motive: Frustration

The Hyvinkää shooting was a mass shooting that occurred on 26 May 2012, in the early hours of the morning in the centre of Hyvinkää, Finland, when an 18-year-old man, opened fire onto crowds outside restaurants of Uudenmaankatu street from atop a nearby building using two rifles. Two people were killed and seven others were wounded. The shooter fled the scene and was arrested the same day. An 18-year-old female student nurse died during the incident and pesäpallo player Topi Koistinen, who was 19, died later in hospital from his wounds. A police officer was amongst the wounded. On May 28, the city of Hyvinkää held a mourning period, and educational institutions observed held a moment of silence.

The shooter was identified as Eero Hiltunen, who stated he was motivated by frustration he felt following a wrestling match which he had lost the night of the shooting. A mental health examination had ultimately found that Hiltunen was sane at the time of the crime. Hyvinkää District Court sentenced Hiltunen to life imprisonment in February 2013. In October 2020, Hiltunen escaped from prison after being put on leave and was promptly recaptured.

== Background ==
The shooter was an 18-year-old man from Hyvinkää named Eero Samuli Hiltunen, born 19 June 1993. He had no previous criminal record, but had been treated for mental health issues in 2008.

Immediately prior to the incident, Hiltunen had spent the Friday evening at a friend's house, from where they walked to the center of Hyvinkää. During the trip, they were joined by a group of young individuals that Hiltunen did not know. He lost in a wrestling match with one of them, which the other members of the group regarded as merely playful during interrogations. The group spent the evening drinking alcohol in a restaurant until Hiltunen and another group member began arguing, and Hiltunen threatened to kill the group members. The group later said he also had made gestures with his hands that resembled loading a firearm, before he left alone in a taxi at around 11 p.m.

== Shooting ==
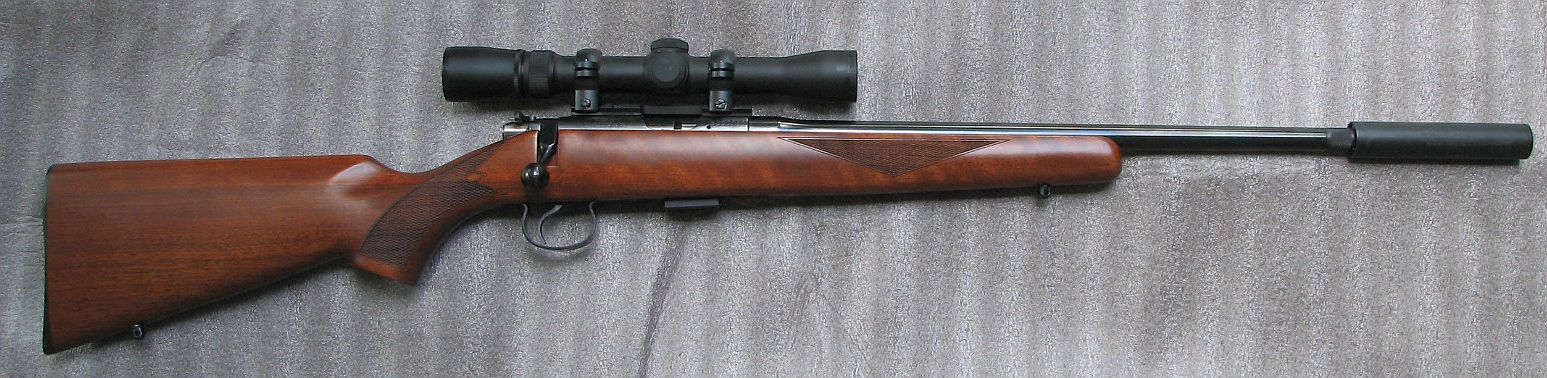
A CZ 452, Hiltunen's father's model of this rifle was stolen by his son and used in the shooting.

A few hours after leaving the group, Hiltunen arrived at his apartment and left with two bolt action rifles and one 80 cartridges in a carrying case, taken from a locked gun safe. One was a CZ 452 chambered in .22 long rifle and was equipped with a telescopic sight, whilst the other was a SAKO L579 chambered in .308-caliber and used for range shooting and hunting. The firearms belonged to his father, and Hiltunen did not have a firearm license. Hiltunen returned to the centre of Hyvinkää on a scooter, and due to his severe intoxication, fell twice during his trip and lost some of the cartridges along with a knife. Also during the commute, he changed into camouflage trousers and fired a singular shot from the .308 rifle into ground.

After returning to the centre of Hyvinkää, he climbed onto the roof of a low-rise commercial building using a ladder behind the building. He stayed on the roof for about 15–20 minutes, watching restaurant-goers through the scope of his rifle whilst listening to music. He also talked to a friend over a phone before posting a message on Facebook stating "It was nice, comrades" and messaging one of his friends "You get an AK74 and drums and stuff."

At approximately 1:50 a.m., he began shooting indiscriminately at people in front of and within two restaurants and a shop. The gunshots were not immediately identified as such by witnesses, as a result of Hiltunen's use of a silencer muffling the gunfire. It was also difficult to determine the source of the shots. Security guards in the area urged people into shelter during the shooting. Hiltunen fired 22 shots in total (18 from the .22 rifle and 4 from the .308 rifle) during the incident and subsequently fled the scene. The emergency services received one of the first calls regarding the shooting at 1:53 a.m., and first responders arrived at the scene less than a minute later. Hiltunen slept through the rest of the night in a forest, and was arrested at around 8 a.m. in the countryside of Jokela, about two kilometers from the scene of the crime. The .22 rifle was found on the roof of the building and the hunting rifle in the countryside.

== Victims ==
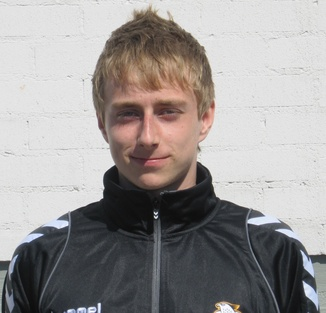
Pesäpallo player Topi Koistinen (pictured in 2011) was shot dead in the shooting at the age of 19.

An 18-year-old female student nurse died during shooting and a 19-year-old male, Topi Koistinen, a pesäpallo player for Hyvinkään Tahko in Finnish Premier, later died at the Töölö Hospital as a result of his wounds. Seven others people were injured, including 23-year-old police officer and goalkeeper for HJK Helsinki, Heidi Foxell, who was working as a trainee at the time and was hit before she could put on a thicker protective vest. She was taken to hospital in critical condition. Two other injured victims were also members of Tahko club alongside Koistinen. The injured were initially taken to Hyvinkää Hospital and from there to Töölö Hospital and Meilahti Tower Hospital in Helsinki for further treatment.

== Investigation ==
During interrogation, Hiltunen said that he regretted his actions but could not provide a motive. He appeared in Hyvinkää District Court on 28 May on suspicion of two murders and several attempted murders. The Hyvinkää District Court ordered him to undergo a mental status examination in August before the first trial. The results of his mental status examination were announced at the first hearing. According to the examination, he was culpable when he committed the acts and did not have a mental illness that would have prevented him from understanding the moral and factual nature of his actions or preventing him from regulating his behavior. Hiltunen ultimately admitted to committing the shooting. Hiltunen stated his motivation was frustration that he felt following the wrestling match the night of the shooting, with his anger rising at the restaurant before taking the taxi to retrieve weapons.

According to police, the people who were with Hiltunen the night before the shootings had no involvement in the crime. They denied having any prior knowledge of Hiltunen's intentions and were unable to provide any motivation behind his actions. None of them had been among those targeted on the night of the shootings. One person who was part of the group and had known Hiltunen before the shootings said that he was surprised and shocked by the death threats he had made. Hiltunen was found to have had no connections to any political or religious extremist groups.

== Legal proceedings and imprisonment ==
In November, Hiltunen was charged with two counts of murder, seven counts attempted murder, and endangering the lives of 32 people. A preliminary hearing was held at Hyvinkää District Court on 19 December and the trial began on 8 January 2013. Mikko Ruuttunen, the lawyer for the wounded Heidi Foxell, filed a claim against Hiltunen for a total of €95,000 in compensation for her injuries. According to the lawyer, the police officer was released from intensive care on 5 September 2012 and was still in the hospital ward during the trial. Other injured parties filed claims for compensation totaling more than half a million euros. In his closing statement read on 22 January 2013, Hiltunen's defence lawyer pointed out that, according to a mental health assessment, Hiltunen's personality structure is immature for his age. He also mentioned that Hiltunen's impulse control has been inadequate and he has shown a lack of a sense of reality. Citing these claims, the defense argued that even if the acts were considered murder, a reduced sentence should be applied to Hiltunen. The prosecution, in turn, demanded life imprisonment for the accused.

On 28 February 2013, the Hyvinkää District Court sentenced Hiltunen to life imprisonment for two murders, seven attempted murders and life endangerment, and ordered him to pay over 400,000 euros in damages and legal costs to the injured parties. A mental health examination had ultimately found that Hiltunen was sane at the time of the crime. Hiltunen did not appeal the verdict, however, one of the injured parties filed an appeal regarding the payment of legal aid from state funds.

=== Assault on Hiltunen ===
While Hiltunen was in pre-trial detention in September 2012, boiling oil was thrown at him causing second-degree burns to various parts of his body. The perpetrator was Joona Hasselqvist, who was convicted of the murder of Jenna Lepomäki on the Spanish Costa del Sol in June 2011. The act took place about a week after the Pirkanmaa District Court had sentenced Hasselqvist and his accomplice to life imprisonment. According to the prosecutor, the act had been carried out in a particularly brutal and cruel manner and that Hasselqvist's intention was to cause Hiltunen severe bodily harm. In April 2013, the Southwest Finland District Court sentenced Hasselqvist to one year and three months in prison for aggravated assault. Moreover, the prosecutor had accused Hiltunen for assaulting Hasselqvist after he threw oil at Hiltunen, punching Hasselqvist in the back of the head and in the corner of his eye. However, Hiltunen was acquitted of the assault charges. Immediately after the trial, Hasselqvist was transferred back to Riihimäki Prison and Hiltunen to Vantaa Prison to serve their life sentences.

=== Prison escape ===
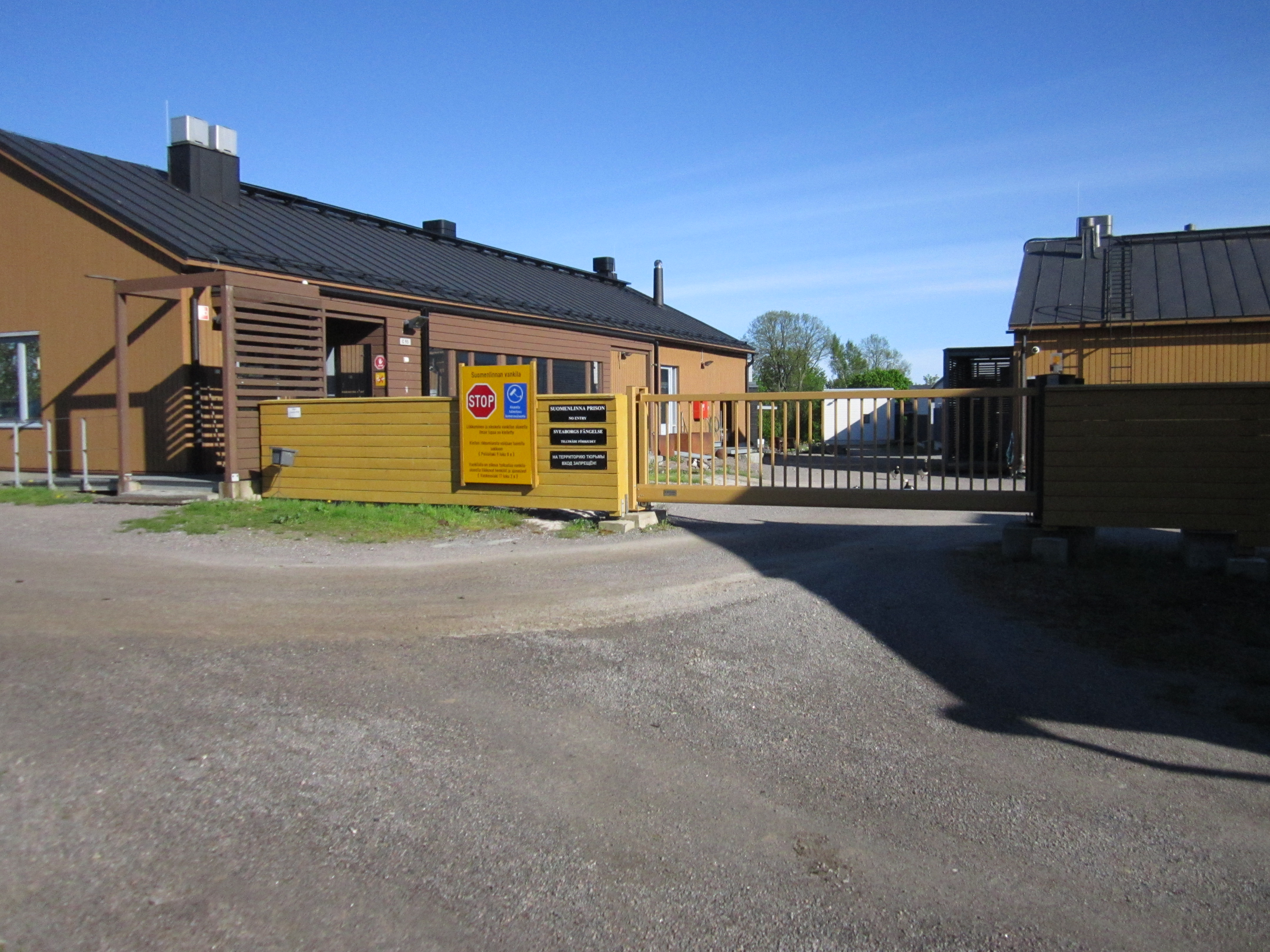
Hiltunen escaped from Suomenlinna prison in October 2020.

The Criminal Sanctions Agency announced on October 15, 2020, that a prisoner who had cut off his ankle monitor had failed to return from his prison leave. According to information received by Iltalehti newspaper, the prisoner in question was Hiltunen, who was serving his sentence in an open prison, Suomenlinna. According to the newspaper, Hiltunen was searched for with the help of police dogs, covering the area around Finnish national road 25. Based on tips from the locals, Hiltunen was arrested at Helsinki Central Station the following evening. The police said that the arrest had been peaceful.

=== Applications for parole ===
In June 2021, Hiltunen submitted an application for parole to the Helsinki Court of Appeal. However, in March 2022, he sent an email to the Court of Appeal withdrawing his application. Hiltunen applied for parole again at the end of February 2024. The Court of Appeal stated they would decide on the matter based on the risk assessment of Hiltunen and the statement of the Criminal Sanctions Agency at the earliest in 2025. He was denied parole in June that year, motivating the decision by the fact that he had "not yet served a sufficient portion of his sentence". Nevertheless, the court acknowledged that Hiltunen's conduct in prison had been well-behaved and found no evidence that he posed an "obvious danger" of committing another serious offence if released.

== Reactions ==
President of Finland Sauli Niinistö, Minister of the Interior Päivi Räsänen and Minister of Finance Jutta Urpilainen expressed their condolences to the families of the victims. Mayor of Hyvinkää Raimo Lahti described the events as tragic and believed that they would have a long-lasting impact on the lives of the people of Hyvinkää.

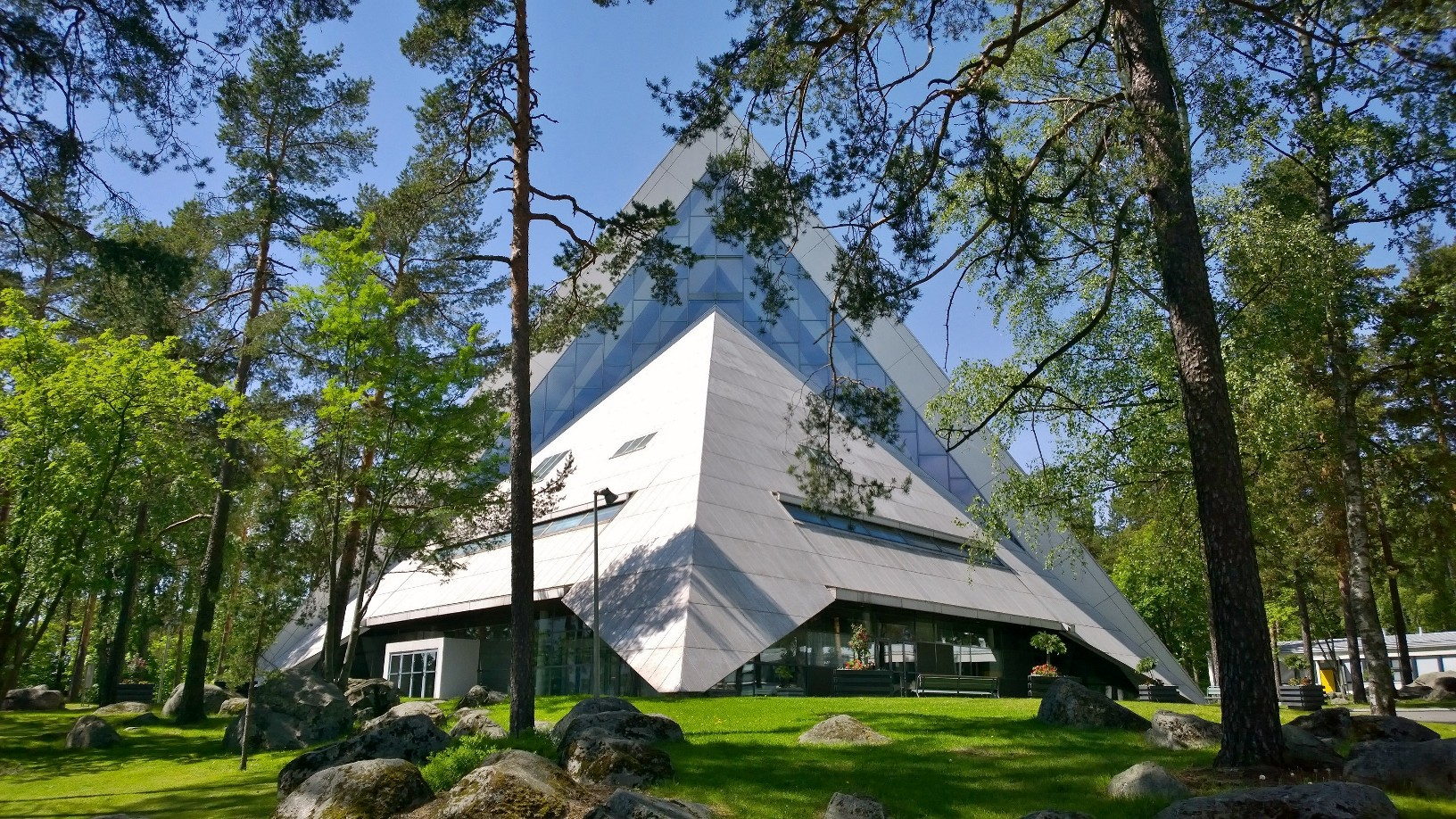
A memorial service was held at the Hyvinkää Church on the evening of the shooting.

A memorial service for the victims was held at Hyvinkää Church on the Saturday evening, attended by approximately 400 people. Speaking at the service, Bishop Tapio Luoma of the Diocese of Espoo emphasized that "no one should be left alone in the midst of grief and anxiety". The city of Hyvinkää held a general mourning period on May 28, and educational institutions held a moment of silence, occurring on the same day at 9 o'clock. Additionally, schools increased mental health support for students. The incident particularly affected the Hyria Vocational School, where both of the deceased had studied. A book of condolences was opened in the lobby of Hyvinkää City Hall, where residents could write their condolences.

As the deceased Topi Koistinen was a player for the Superpesis team Hyvinkää Tahko, the Finnish Pesäpallo Association decided to cancel all adult league matches under the association for that weekend. As a result of Foxell's injury, the HJK Helsinki team's next Kansallinen Liiga match was postponed to a later date. Three restaurant security guards, who had directed people to safety during the shooting and put themselves at risk as they were not wearing any protective gear, were awarded life-saving medals in May 2013.

== See also ==
- 2012 in Finland
- List of mass shootings in Finland
- Imatra shooting
- Myyrmanni bombing
- 2011 Liège attack, Highland Park parade shooting and Sagarejo shooting - Similar sniper-style mass shootings
- Tommy Zethraeus - Swedish mass murderer who targeted a restaurant
