= François Bazaramba =

Rwandan criminal (1951–2026)

- Born: 1 January 1951; Nshili, Gikongoro Province, Ruanda-Urundi
- Died: 16 January 2026 (aged 75); Kerava Prison, Kerava, Finland
- Occupation: Paster
- Known for: Participating in the Rwandan genocide in 1994
- Conviction: Genocide
- Penalty: Life imprisonment

Details
- Country: Rwanda
- State: Butare Province
- Location: Nyakizu
- Date apprehended: 2007

François Bazaramba (1 January 1951 – 16 January 2026) was a Rwandan sentenced to life imprisonment in Finland for participating in the Rwandan genocide in 1994. The Bazaramba case is historic in Finnish legal history because it was the first time anyone was sentenced under Finland's "crimes against humanity" laws (section 1 of Chapter 11 of the Criminal Code) since the international norms against genocide were implemented in national law. The case was appealed up to the Supreme Court of Finland, which upheld the conviction.

== Biography ==
While living in Rwanda, Bazaramba worked as a teacher and a headmaster for a vocational school. Later he became a pastor in the Zambian Baptist Church.

Bazaramba arrived in Finland in 2003 as a refugee. During background checks, the Finnish Immigration Service found his name in a Human Rights Watch report. The police investigation started in 2006, and the National Bureau of Investigation sent investigators to Rwanda. Bazaramba was taken into custody in 2007.

Rwanda requested that Bazaramba be extradited in February 2009, but the Finnish Ministry of Justice denied the request.

The trial started in June 2009 in the District Court of Porvoo. In September, the court travelled to Rwanda to hear witnesses. Bazaramba stayed in Finland and watched the sessions via a video link which was translated into French to him because he didn't speak Finnish.

In February 2010, the court travelled to Tanzania to hear witnesses from five African countries. All together, more than 60 witnesses were heard.

In June 2010, Bazaramba was convicted and given a life sentence. According to the findings of the Finnish court, he orchestrated deadly attacks, and organised the torching of Tutsi homes. He also was convicted of spreading anti-Tutsi propaganda and inciting "killings through fomenting anger and contempt towards Tutsis". The Helsingin Sanomat reported that he was acquitted of 10 counts of murder and of providing training and acquiring weapons.

Bazaramba appealed his conviction to the Helsinki Court of Appeal. Witnesses were again heard in Rwanda and Tanzania. In March 2012, the appeals court convicted Bazaramba and gave him a life sentence. He appealed to the Supreme Court of Finland, which denied the appeal.

In 2013, Bazaramba appealed to the European Court of Human Rights with the claim that some of the witnesses had been tortured.

In January 2019, the Helsinki Court of Appeal rejected Bazaramba's request to be paroled. In March 2021, the court rejected another request to be paroled with motivation that the acts of crime that he had done were considered so serious that he should be in jail longer than the average prisoner with a life sentence.

On 16 January 2026, Bazaramba was found unconscious in the sauna of Kerava Prison, Finland. He was declared dead immediately after. Bazaramba was 75.
