= List of mass shootings in Norway =

This article is a list of mass shootings in Norway. Mass shootings are firearm-related violence with at least four casualties. Shootings associated with acts of war, such as the German occupation of Norway are excluded.

== 20th century ==
Date	Location	Region	Dead	Injured	Total	Description
4 May 1938	Braskereidfoss	Innlandet	5 (Note: Including the perpetrator or perpetrators.)	3 (Note: Two by stabbing)	8	A man armed with a rifle and knife killed his father, friend, a police officer and a chauffeur. He also wounded several others including two police officers with a knife. The rampage concluded when the perpetrator was killed by police.
14 July 1947	Åsnes	Innlandet	2	2	4	A man armed with a handgun killed his fiance and wounded two others before killing himself.
2 December 1959	Lande	Østfold	4	0	4	A man shot and killed his wife, two children and himself.
19 March 1965	Heldalsmo	Agder	4	2	6	A man armed with a rifle and a shotgun killed four people and wounded two others before being arrested.
15 October 1966	Kristiansand	Agder	1	3	4	A man armed with a handgun opened fire inside an apartment, killing one person and wounding two others before wounding himself.
9 January 1971	Askim	Østfold	4	0	4	A man shot and killed his wife, two children and himself.
25 August 1974	Sponvika	Østfold	0	5	5	A shooting incident at Svalerødkilen left five people wounded.
19 August 1978	Tonsenhagen	Oslo	1	4	5	A man armed with a handgun killed a woman and wounded three others before wounding himself.
23 October 1980	Budalen	Nordland	1 (Note: Four died in the fire)	3	4	A man lit his relatives house on fire and then started shooting towards the fleeing victims, wounding three before the man killed himself. The fire itself killed four people.
1 May 1987	Øvre Hålandsdal	Hordaland	4	0	4	A man shot and killed his mother, father, sister and brother-in-law before being arrested.
20 August 1988	Farsund	Agder	4	2	6	Farsund shooting: A man armed with a shotgun killed four people and wounded two others at a shooting range.

== 21st century ==
Date	Location	Region	Dead	Injured	Total	Description
12 January 2002	Geilo	Buskerud	4	1	5	A man armed with a rifle killed three members of the same family and wounded another before killing himself.
2 February 2002	Årvoll	Oslo	4	0	4	A man armed with a rifle killed three of his friends before killing himself.
29 September 2002	Græsberget	Innlandet	4	0	4	A man armed with a rifle killed his wife, two children and himself.
22 July 2011	Utøya	Buskerud	69 (Note: Two indirectly)	32 (Note: Dozens indirectly.)	101	2011 Norway attacks: A man dressed in a homemade police uniform opened fire at a summer camp, killing 67 and wounding 32 others. Two victims were killed indirectly during the attack.
9 July 2017	Grünerløkka	Oslo	0	4	4	A man armed with a handgun opened fire outside a nightclub wounding four people.
6 December 2021	Berger	Buskerud	4	0	4	A man killed his wife, two children and himself with a shotgun.
25 June 2022	Sentrum	Oslo	2	9 (Note: Twelve indirectly.)	11	2022 Oslo shooting: An Iranian-born Norwegian man armed with two firearms killed two people and wounded nine others before being arrested.
23 January 2024	Skogbygda	Akershus	4	0	4	A man shot and killed his two daughters, a grandchild and himself with a shotgun.
23 March 2024	Torpo	Buskerud	4	0	4	A man armed with a rifle killed his wife, two children and himself.

== See also ==
- List of mass shootings in Finland
- List of mass shootings in Russia
- List of mass shootings in Sweden
