= Battle of Keltis =

Battle of Keltis barracks
- Part of the Russo-Swedish War (1788–90)
Date	May 19–20, 1790 (2 days)
Location	Keltis, Finland
Result	Swedish victory

Belligerents
(Russian Empire) Russia	Sweden

Commanders and leaders
General Backman	General Vilhelm Mauritz Pauli

Strength
3,000 men	2,000 men

Casualties and losses
200 killed unknown wounded	44 killed 60 wounded

The Battle of Keltis or Battle of Keltis barracks took place in Gustav III's Russian War between May 19–20, 1790 at Keltis in present-day Finland. It ended with a Swedish victory.

== Battle ==
In the spring of 1790 King Gustav III of Sweden personally led a force of 4,000 men across the Kymi River in Finland at the then Swedish-Russian border. After defeating a Russian force at the Battle of Valkeala the Swedish and Russian forces became entangled in a series of manoeuvres and skirmishes in the area near Keltis and Valkeala.

A Swedish force of 800 men that had been left at the village of Nappa near Keltis came under attack by a 2,500 strong Russian force commanded by General Backman. The Swedes retreated in an orderly fashion and were soon reinforced when General Vilhelm Mauritz Pauli arrived with 1,200 men. Meanwhile, the Russian force halted and positioned itself at the Keltis barracks, originally built as a Swedish guardpost, where it also received some reinforcements.

With his 2,000-man force General Pauli felt confident enough to launch a counterattack against the Russians and marched in the evening of May 19 against Keltis barracks. During the night of May 19–20 the Swedes attacked and after a short but bloody battle the surprised and shaken Russians retreated.

Left behind on the battlefield were 200 dead Russians. The Swedes had suffered 40 dead soldiers, four officers and 60 wounded.
