= Putt Putt shootings =

2008 spree shooting in Belize

- Location: 17.50568°N 88.18839°W; Belize City, Belize (Putt Putt Bar & Grill; Belcan Bridge; Raccoon Street Extension)
- Date: 9 February 2008 ca 2:45 am to ca 4:15 am CT
- Attack type: Spree shooting, mass shooting
- Deaths: 2
- Injuries: 13–14
- Perpetrators: Back a Town (alleged), George Street (alleged)
- Motive: Gang warfare (alleged)
- Accused: 4
- Convicted: 1

The Putt Putt shootings (Note: Also Putt Putt massacre; Putt Putt attack; Putt Putt incident. Proper name also Putt-Putt.) were three allegedly connected and gang-related shootings in the predawn hours of 9 February 2008 in Belize City, Belize. The first shooting in Putt Putt Bar & Grill resulted in the death of 19 year old Deandra Zetina, and injuries to nine others. The second shooting on the Belcan Bridge left 17 year old Michelle Cattouse dead, and three or four others injured. The last shooting on Raccoon Street Extension left one injured. Four men were arrested and charged for the shootings, but Crown counsel secured a conviction only for the third one. The shootings are jointly deemed the first and worst mass shooting in the country's history.

== Background ==
Putt Putt Bar & Grill was a lively, open-air joint on Princess Margaret Drive in Newtown Barracks. Neighbours had allegedly noticed an uptick in gun crime since its opening, with one later asserting "there [were] commonly gunshots in the morning in the neighborhood around Putt Putt", and another stating, "it is almost every weekend that we live basically in fear [of stray bullets]". On 8 February 2008 (a Friday), Putt Putt was nevertheless bustling with patrons celebrating the previous day's general elections.

== Shootings ==
1 Putt Putt Bar & Grill
2 Belcan Bridge
3 Raccoon Street Extension

At circa 2:45 am CT on 9 February 2008, two shooters jumped the back fence and opened fire from the rear shrubbery of the crowded Putt Putt Bar & Grill, indiscriminately spraying at least 37 bullets. Nine people were shot and injured, while 19 year old Deandra Zetina (St Michael's College fourth former) was shot and killed. (Note: News 5 2008a; 7 News 2008e; Amandala 2008b. Zetina, an orphan and sickle cell anaemic, was on her first day back bartending after medical leave (7 News 2008e; 7 News 2008d). Her weekend job helped pay for school (7 News 2008e). Their family had prior lost a cousin to gun violence, "a little young boy, died the same way [as Zetina] and nobody know, nobody no talk, nobody no see" (7 News 2008e). Injured survivors included Philip Neal (17), Vincent Galvez (19), Marvin Robinson (27), Kenroy Tillett (29), Edison Flowers, Gilbert Pascacio, Christopher Galvez, Jermyn Galvez (News 5 2008a; 7 News 2008b; 7 News 2008d). The ninth injured survivor identified as Dale Moody by News 5 2008a, though 7 News 2008d possibly identify them as Harry Joseph (18).) An on-duty policeman returned fire, prompting the shooters to flee.

At circa 3 am on the Belcan Bridge, a group of four or five patrons en route home from Putt Putt were approached by a grey Toyota Camry from which a single shooter alighted and opened fire, killing 17 year old Michelle Cattouse (Nazarene High fourth former) and injuring three or four of her companions. (Note: News 5 2008a; 7 News 2008b; 7 News 2008d; 7 News 2008e; Amandala 2008b; 7 News 2011i. Injured survivors included Delarose Puerto (17), Tarique Bowden (19), Cyril Jones (26) (News 5 2008a; 7 News 2008d). A fourth victim nonfatally injured per 7 News 2008f, News 5 2009e, 7 News 2011i (but only three so injured per News 5 2008a, Amandala 2008b), identified as Harry Joseph in News 5 2009e and possibly in 7 News 2008d.)

At circa 4:15 am on Raccoon Street Extension, 16 year old Linton Broaster and two friends (also homebound from Putt Putt) were allegedly approached by Leroy Ramsey, who opened fire five times, injuring Broaster and missing his friends.

== Aftermath ==
All fifteen or sixteen injured victims were rushed to Karl Heusner Memorial Hospital, where Zetina and Cattouse were pronounced dead. (Note: 7 News 2008b. Fifteen (fatally and nonfatally) injured per News 5 2008a, Amandala 2008g, News 5 2009e; sixteen per 7 News 2008e, Amandala 2008b.) By 11 February, four of the injured survivors remained hospitalised, with Broaster in serious but stable condition, and Edison Flowers and Vincent Galvez in critical condition.

Police believed all three shootings were connected and related to an ongoing feud between two rival gangs. They suspected the first shooting had been perpetrated by Back a Town gang members from St Martin de Porres, allegedly looking to hit some George Street gang members from Lake Independence who happened to be socialising at Putt Putt. (Note: News 5 2008a; Amandala 2008b. These gangs had last been reported feuding in mid June 2007, with police brokering an "uneasy truce" on 20 June (7 News 2007k; 7 News 2007l; Amandala 2007i).) The second shooting was thought to be retaliation by the latter for the first shooting, as Cattouse and her three companions allegedly "were associates or were associated with" Back a Town. (Note: News 5 2008a; 7 News 2008b. Cattouse's family denied any gang affiliation (Amandala 2008b).) The third shooting was likewise deemed retaliation by George Street, as Broaster and his two friends allegedly "were associated with" Back a Town and had had "a previous misunderstanding" earlier that night with Ramsey at Putt Putt. Press further speculated that the first shooting had been a preemptive strike by Back a Town, given reports suggesting "a hit had been put out on" one of their affiliates. Police suggested it may have been retaliation for the murder of Jason Munnings the weekend prior. (Note: Amandala 2008b; Amandala 2008d. Munnings (29; BWS water meter reader) was shot and killed on 2 February in Belize City in an apparent hit, but family asserted he had been "a loving, carefree young man with no known enemies and no history of gang or criminal activities" (7 News 2008m; Amandala 2008j).) No criminal mastermind (who presumably ordered the hit on George Street, or alleged preemptive strike by Back a Town) was identified, prompting accusations of possible police or political corruption in the press.

On 9 February, Jason King (29) and Charles Moss (35) were arrested and charged for the first shooting, and Roy Bennett (20; aka Roy Felix) for the second. King and Moss had been chased by police to Jasmine Street from Putt Putt, where they were found with two 9 mm pistols, allegedly those used in Putt Putt. Bennett had allegedly been identified from CCTV footage. On 11 February, Leroy Ramsey (22) was arrested and charged for the third shooting. He had allegedly been identified by Broaster. The case against King and Moss was stuck out on 20 March 2009 when "the prosecutor failed to present the case file", though both were immediately rearrested on undisclosed charges. (Note: 7 News 2009h; News 5 2009d; Amandala 2009h. Case file (disclosure to the defence during the preliminary inquiry) not proferred despite thirteen adjournments for the Crown to do so since December 2008 (7 News 2009h; Amandala 2009h). Arrests made despite "there [being], technically and legally speaking, no papers to re-arrest the two accused men" (Amandala 2009h).) The case against Bennett similarly fell apart on 1 June 2011 when Crown counsel Keisha Williams entered a nolle pros motion "because the witnesses who were crucial to the case [had] made themselves unavailable". Ramsey was found guilty of two counts of attempted murder, and sentenced to eight years' prison on 26 April 2013.

Despite neighbours' opposition, Putt Putt proprietor Orson Elrington renovated and reopened the bar and grill by late February, though their liquor licence was revoked due to noise complaints.

== Legacy ==
The shootings are deemed the first and worst mass shooting in the country's history, often compared to the 2022 Hopkins mass shooting. (Note: News 5 2022b; 7 News 2022a; Amandala 2022a. But see List of mass shootings in Belize for prior shootings with at least three casualties.) 7 News called the shootings "the most outrageous and cold blooded assault this city has ever seen". News 5 commented, "Belize City is no stranger to gang violence but in the wee hours of Saturday morning that cycle of murder and fatal retaliation reached a new level of insanity". Amandala renewed calls for the death penalty, adding, "for a city inured to the daily reports of violence in the streets, [the shootings] produced a level of violence never before seen in this violent city". They likened the shootings to the May 2008 Mayflower grenade attack, deeming both "unprecedented mass attacks".

The 2008 St Michael's pageant in April was dedicated to Zetina, whose seat had been left vacant as "a daily visual reminder of the scourge of street violence, which hit close to home for her classmates". The shootings prompted local poet Proshka to pen Belizean Bloodshed.

== See also ==
- List of mass shootings in Belize – including some spree shootings

== Notes and references ==
1. "Police trying to diffuse escalating gang tensions". 7 News. 19 June 2007.
2. "Police brokers uneasy truce between rival street factions". 7 News. 20 June 2007.
3. "Police detain George St. and Back-a-town at Eastern Division for peace meeting". Amandala. 22 June 2007.
4. "Lease cancelled, prime land at Barracks sold". News 5. 4 January 2008.
5. "Couple's dream of marriage shattered by murder". 7 News. 4 February 2008.
6. "Who killed Jason Munnings Saturday night?". Amandala. 5 February 2008.
7. "Two dead, thirteen injured in gang shooting sprees". News 5. 11 February 2008.
8. "Great 08: Putt Putt massacre". 7 News. 11 February 2008.
9. "Mr. Putt Putt Orson Elrington tells his side". 7 News. 11 February 2008.
10. "Friday night mayhem at Putt Putt Bar". 7 News. 11 February 2008.
11. "2 female high school students killed in Friday night mayhem". 7 News. 12 February 2008.
12. "Insanity!!". Amandala. 12 February 2008.
13. "Putt Putt will renovate then reopen". 7 News. 13 February 2008.
14. "Death penalty V". Amandala. 15 February 2008.
15. "Liquor board revokes Putt-Putt license, manager cries foul". News 5. 25 February 2008.
16. "From the publisher". Amandala. 28 February 2008.
17. "A pageant for a cause". 7 News. 1 April 2008.
18. "Insanity, or a deliberate plot to confuse?". Amandala. 1 April 2008.
19. "The contrast". Amandala. 3 April 2008.
20. "Belizean Bloodshed – Angela Gegg". Belize TV. 3 April 2008.
21. "Mayflower (May 18) and Putt Putt (February 8) – exactly 100 days are up!". Amandala. 20 May 2008.
22. "Men accused of Putt Putt attack released then rearrested". 7 News. 20 March 2009.
23. "Two freed of murder for less than five minutes". News 5. 20 March 2009.
24. "Prosecution's failures causes PI for accused murderers Moss and King to be struck out". Amandala. 24 March 2009.
25. "Roy Bennett to stand trial for murder". News 5. 22 October 2009.
26. "Accused killer gets off". 7 News. 1 June 2011.
27. "Sentenced for shooting man in chest". 7 News. 26 April 2013.
28. "Hopkins Day is marred by another mass shooting". News 5. 2 August 2022.
29. "Gunmen unleash terror in Hopkins". 7 News. 2 August 2022.
30. "Mass shooting in Hopkins: 2 dead, 8 injured". Amandala. 4 August 2022.
