= List of mass shootings in Finland =

This article is a list of mass shootings in Finland. Mass shootings are firearm-related violence with at least four casualties. Shootings associated with acts of war, such as the Finnish Civil War are excluded, see List of massacres in Finland.

== 20th century ==
Date	Location	Region	Dead	Injured	Total	Description
25 August 1923	Solberg	Uusimaa	1 (Note: Including the perpetrator or perpetrators.)	3	4	A man shot and wounded three men who attacked him and then killed himself.
15 January 1926	Helsinki	Uusimaa	4	0	4	Kaivopuisto familicide: A major shot and killed his wife and two children with a handgun before killing himself.
1 June 1926	Taavetti	South Karelia	3	1	4	Taavetti bank robbery: Two men armed with handguns shot and killed three people and wounded another during a bank robbery. They fled the scene and were later arrested.
4 September 1927	Simola	South Savo	1	3	4	A man shot and killed one person and wounded three others.
26 March 1928	Kärkölä	Uusimaa	2	2	4	A man armed with a handgun killed one person and wounded two others across two households before killing himself.
10 September 1928	Kuusaanniemi	Kymenlaakso	4	0	4	A man shot and killed his wife and two children with a handgun before killing himself.
13 June 1929	Reposaari	Satakunta	2	2	4	A drunken man shot and killed one person and wounded two others with a handgun before killing himself.
27 January 1930	Inkeroinen	Kymenlaakso	3	1	4	A man shot three other men during a drunken argument, killing two and wounding one, before attempting suicide. The perpetrator later died in hospital.
14 February 1930	Muurame	Central Finland	4	0	4	A jealous man killed his girlfriend, child and another man before killing himself.
13 June 1930	Helsinki	Uusimaa	3	1	4	A man shot and killed his wife and two children with a handgun before attempting suicide.
15 February 1931	Helsinki	Uusimaa	3	1	4	A drunken man opened fire with a handgun inside an apartment located in Hakaniemi, killing three and wounding one before the weapon malfunctioned and the perpetrator was arrested.
4 May 1934	Vuojoki	Satakunta	3	1	4	A man killed his two sons and wounded his wife with a handgun before killing himself.
26 June 1935	Helsinki	Uusimaa	4	0	4	A man armed with two handguns killed his wife, son, another woman and himself in Ullanlinna.
9 December 1935	Varkaus	North Savo	2	2	4	A man armed with a handgun killed a waitress and wounded two others in a restaurant before killing himself.
26 January 1937	Hietala	Viipuri	7	0	7	An agronomic killed his wife and five children with a handgun before killing himself.
16 September 1938	Mämmälä	Kymenlaakso	5	1	6	1938 Sippola shootings: A man armed with a handgun went on a shooting spree killing four people and wounding one other before killing himself.
12 August 1939	Maavesi	North Savo	3	1	4	A man armed with a rifle and a shotgun killed his father, a police officer and wounded his neighbor before killing himself.
6 September 1939	Parikkala	South Karelia	4	1	5	A man shot and killed three people and wounded another with a handgun before killing himself.
14 October 1939	Koskenkorva	South Ostrobothnia	6	0	6	A man shot and killed his wife and four children with a handgun before killing himself.
9 August 1943	Lumivaara	Viipuri	4	0	4	A man shot and killed his three children before killing himself.
17 April 1944	Valkeaviita	Kanta-Häme	4	1	5	A farmer killed three neighbors and wounded another with a handgun before killing himself.
18 December 1944	Muhos	North Ostrobothnia	4	0	4	A prison guard armed with a rifle shot and killed his two children, a maidservant and himself.
19 April 1945	Valkeamäki	South Savo	4	0	4	A man armed with a handgun killed his wife, a daughter from previous marriage and her cousin. The man lit the house on fire, killed several farm animals and then killed himself.
27 February 1947	Nappa	Kymenlaakso	5	0	5	A farmer armed with a handgun shot and killed his wife, three children and himself.
12 April 1951	Sodankylä	Lapland	4	1	5	A chauffeur killed his wife, two daughters and wounded his mother-in-law with a handgun before killing himself.
8 July 1951	Elfvik	Uusimaa	4	0	4	An entrepreneur killed his ex-wife, son and a police officer before killing himself.
22 April 1952	Helsinki	Uusimaa	4	0	4	A man killed his parents and a sibling with a handgun before killing himself in Töölö.
8 May 1952	Hämeenkyrö	Pirkanmaa	4	0	4	A farmer killed his wife and two children with a handgun before killing himself.
18 September 1952	Helsinki	Uusimaa	1	3	4	A shootout during a prison break left one guard dead and three others wounded.
2 November 1952	Kompero	North Karelia	1	3	4	A man armed with a handgun shot and killed his brother-in-law, wounded his in-laws and his wife before being arrested.
5 May 1953	Alakylä	South Ostrobothnia	3	2	5	A man killed his brother, two nephews and wounded his sister-in-law and niece with a handgun before being arrested.
9 February 1954	Punkalaidun	Pirkanmaa	4	0	4	A man killed his wife and two children with a shotgun before killing himself.
25 September 1954	Helsinki	Uusimaa	4	1	5	A man killed his mother, sister and a nephew and wounded his father before killing himself in Vallila.
26 March 1957	Itä-Aure	Pirkanmaa	4	3	7	1957 Kuru shootings: A man armed with two rifles shot and killed two police officers and wounded three others before killing himself. The perpetrator also lit fires and had shot and killed his father two days before the attack.
14 August 1958	Linnankoski	South Karelia	5	2	7	1958 Linnankoski shootings: A man armed with a handgun went on a shooting spree killing four people and wounding two others before killing himself.
15 March 1961	Lappeenranta	South Karelia	4	0	4	A bank manager killed his wife and three daughters with a handgun before being arrested.
9 December 1963	Inkere	Southwest Finland	1	3	4	A teenager armed with a double-barreled shotgun went on a shooting spree killing one person and wounding at least three others before being arrested.
28 November 1964	Valkolanmäki	South Karelia	4	0	4	A man shot and killed his wife and two children, before litting the scene on fire and shooting himself.
7 March 1969	Korppinen	Central Finland	4	0	4	Pihtipudas police murders: A man armed with a rifle shot and killed four police officers before being arrested.
8 November 1971	Rautalampi	North Savo	5	0	5	A farmer shot and killed his wife and three daughters with a hunting rifle before killing himself.
27 November 1971	Kirkkonummi	Uusimaa	4	0	4	An insurance agent shot and killed his wife and two children with a handgun before killing himself.
10 November 1972	Juokslahti	Central Finland	1	3	4	A man armed with a shotgun shot and wounded his wife and parents-in-law before killing himself.
30 July 1973	Helsinki	Uusimaa	1	4	5	A man armed with a handgun shot and killed one person and wounded three others before being shot and wounded by police.
5 April 1975	Kanunki	Southwest Finland	4	0	4	A man killed his parents and two siblings with a handgun before fleeing. He was later arrested in Kuopio.
5 October 1982	Tampere	Pirkanmaa	4	0	4	A man shot and killed his wife and two children before killing himself.
25 April 1987	Menkijärvi	South Ostrobothnia	4	0	4	A man armed with a hunting rifle killed his ex-wife and her three siblings before being arrested.
18 October 1990	Inkere	Southwest Finland	3	1	4	A man shot and killed his two children and wounded another one before killing himself.
17 February 1991	Kerava	Uusimaa	4	0	4	A police officer killed his wife and two children with a handgun before killing himself.
21 February 1992	Seinäjoki	South Ostrobothnia	4	0	4	A man killed his wife and two children with a handgun before killing himself.
28 March 1992	Hamina	Kymenlaakso	3	2	5	A man armed with a handgun killed two people including his ex-wife and wounded two others inside an apartment before killing himself.
26 August 1992	Haukipudas	North Ostrobothnia	3	1	4	A man armed with a shotgun killed his wife, a police officer and wounded another policeman before killing himself.
12 September 1992	Lappeenranta	South Karelia	1	3	4	A man shot and killed one person and wounded three others at a horse racing venue.
27 February 1993	Ikola	South Ostrobothnia	5	0	5	A man shot and killed his parents, wife and son before killing himself.
15 November 1997	Joroinen	North Savo	4	0	4	A man killed his wife, daughter and mother-in-law with a semi-automatic shotgun before killing himself.
14 June 1998	Pieksämäki	South Savo	1	4	5	A man armed with two handguns killed his wife, wounded four neighbors and tried to shoot several others before being arrested.
21 February 1999	Helsinki	Uusimaa	3	1	4	Helsinki Shooting Club murders: A woman armed with a rented semi-automatic handgun killed three people and wounded one other at a shooting range before fleeing. She was later arrested at the Helsinki Airport.
18 January 2000	Lahti	Päijät-Häme	3	5	8	Three motorcycle gang members armed with two handguns and a shotgun opened fire on other gang members inside of a pizza restaurant killing three people and wounding five others. Two of the wounded victims were bystanders.
26 December 2000	Vaala	Kainuu	3	1	4	A man shot and killed his father, two brothers and wounded his mother before being arrested.

== 21st century ==
Date	Location	Region	Dead	Injured	Total	Description
23 January 2001	Tuiskula	South Ostrobothnia	4	0	4	A man shot and killed his three children before killing himself.
13 July 2002	Mikkeli	South Savo	0	5	5	A shootout between two groups left five people wounded including one bystander.
15 June 2004	Anttila	Uusimaa	4	0	4	A woman armed with a shotgun shot and killed his husband and two children while they were sleeping before killing herself.
7 November 2007	Jokela	Uusimaa	9	1	10	Jokela school shooting: A male student armed with a semi-automatic handgun shot and killed six students, two faculty members and wounded another student before killing himself.
15 June 2008	Ylitornio	Lapland	4	0	4	An elderly man armed with a revolver and a shotgun shot and killed his wife at a local health center after killing his disabled twin daughters at the family home. The perpetrator killed himself.
23 September 2008	Kauhajoki	South Ostrobothnia	11	1	12	Kauhajoki school shooting: A male student armed with a semi-automatic handgun shot and killed nine students, a teacher and wounded another student before killing himself. The perpetrator also lit fires during his attack. The attack was the worst peacetime mass shooting and mass murder in Finnish history.
18 October 2008	Oulu	North Ostrobothnia	4	0	4	A teacher shot and killed his wife and two children with a shotgun before killing himself in the Kaijonharju district.
31 December 2009	Espoo	Uusimaa	5	0	5	Sello mall shooting: A man armed with a stolen handgun killed four employees at Sello shopping mall before killing himself. Before the shooting the man had killed his ex-girlfriend with a knife.
26 May 2012	Hyvinkää	Uusimaa	2	7	9	Hyvinkää shooting: A man armed with two rifles opened fire from a rooftop, killing two people and wounding seven others, including a police constable. The perpetrator was arrested the next morning.
18 June 2012	Tuunajärvi	Satakunta	4	0	4	A man shot and killed his three children with a handgun before killing himself.
14 December 2013	Helsinki	Uusimaa	0	5	5	Five people were wounded during a shootout between two groups in Malminkartano.
27 July 2024	Seinäjoki	South Ostrobothnia	0	5	5	Five people were wounded during a shootout in a bar.

== See also ==
- List of mass shootings in Sweden
- List of mass shootings in Denmark
- List of mass shootings in Norway
- List of mass shootings in Russia
