= Tiina Wilén-Jäppinen =

Finnish politician

Tiina Wilén-Jäppinen (26 February 1963 – 4 December 2016) was a Finnish politician for the Social Democratic Party. An Imatra native, she served as a member of the city council for the municipality from 2001, and later as chairwoman of the city council from 2009 until her death. She was married with two children.

Wilén-Jäppinen was shot and killed along with two journalists on 4 December 2016 at the Imatra shopping centre. She was 53.
