= List of Brazilian states by murder rate =

This is a list of Brazilian federative units by intentional homicide rate, according to data from the Fórum Brasileiro de Segurança Pública (FBSP)

== Homicide rate by state ==
Data are for the year 2025.

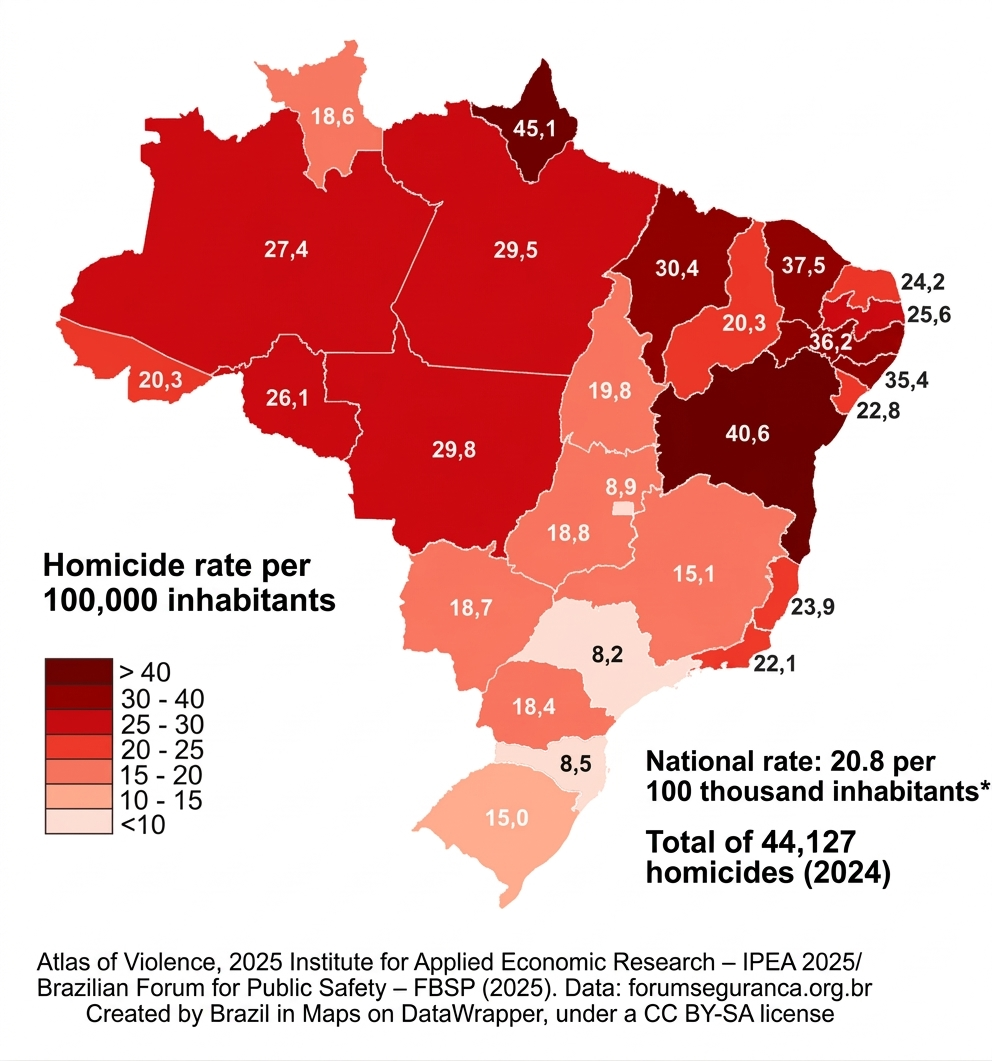
Homicide rate in Brazil in 2021

State	Rate	Homicides	% change from previous year
Brazil	15.4	32,914	-10.0
Ceará	32.1	2,976	-8.1
Pernambuco	31.1	2,970	-9.9
Alagoas	29.0	934	-11.4
Maranhão	26.6	1,865	-6.0
Bahia	25.3	3,765	-12.9
Rondônia	25.1	439	+1.1
Rio Grande do Norte	24.4	843	+28.4
Amapá	24.2	195	-11.4
Paraíba	22.5	936	-5.0
Pará	20.0	1,746	-6.4
Acre	19.8	175	+5.6
Espírito Santo	19.3	796	-7.6
Mato Grosso	18.7	728	-20.5
Roraima	17.3	128	+8.0
Rio de Janeiro	17.1	2,949	+0.4
Tocantins	17.0	269	+6.1
Amazonas	16.8	728	-33.5
Mato Grosso do Sul	16.6	486	+6.2
Piauí	15.5	526	-16.2
Sergipe	13.2	303	-17.3
Minas Gerais	12.6	2,698	-14.2
Goiás	11.0	813	-16.1
Paraná	10.7	1,270	-24.1
Rio Grande do Sul	9.9	1,117	-25.1
Distrito Federal	8.4	253	+8.1
Santa Catarina	5.9	479	-16.4
São Paulo	5.5	2,527	-4.1

== See also ==
List of Brazilian federative units by homicide rate

- Crime in Brazil
- List of cities by murder rate
- Homicide in world cities
- List of countries by firearm-related death rate
- List of countries by intentional homicide rate
