= List of mass shootings in New Zealand =

This article is a list of mass shootings in New Zealand. Mass shootings are firearm-related violence with at least four casualties. Excluded are massacres of Māori people during the New Zealand Wars and other colonial conflicts.

New Zealand has often been contrasted to the United States in its gun laws and responsive nature to mass shootings. After the Christchurch mosque shootings in 2019, the government banned semi-automatic rifles like those used in the attack, as well as creating a firearms registry.

The data includes casualties of perpetrators, including self-inflicted gunshot or shooting of a perpetrator by police. The treatment of perpetrator casualties is at variance to some but not all definitions of a mass shooting used in the United States. The inclusion of injured victims in the data is also at variance with some of the US definitions that only include dead victims. However, the above treatment is consistent with that used in other Wikipedia lists of mass shootings by country.

== 21st century ==
Date	Location	Dead	Injured	Total	Description
5 September 2024	Auckland, Auckland	1	3	4	A teenager fired at other people in a neighbourhood dispute, killing an 18-year-old man and wounding three others. A friend drove the shooter away and hid the rifle used.
20 July 2023	Auckland, Auckland	3 (Note: Including the perpetrator or suspect)	7	10	2023 Auckland shooting: A man shot and killed two colleagues at a construction site and wounded seven other people, including a police officer, before he killed himself.
13 March 2023	Pukekohe, Auckland	0	4	4	Four people were injured in a gang-related shooting.
24 March 2022	Glen Innes, Auckland	0	6	6	Multiple shooters fired from a vehicle into a home, wounding six individuals before fleeing.
10 March 2022	Auckland, Auckland	0	6	6	Six people were wounded in a shootout.
21 November 2021	Glen Eden, Auckland	1	3	4	A man shot at neighbours and police officers responding to a house fire, wounding three officers. Police returned fire and killed the gunman.
6 June 2019	Ōtorohanga District, Waikato	1	3 (Note: Including three of the perpetrators or suspects)	4	A man shot at four home intruders who were armed with a shotgun and machete, injuring them. The assailants fled and stopped at a rural house, where one of them died of their injuries.
15 March 2019	Christchurch, Canterbury	51	40	91	Christchurch mosque shootings: A white supremacist armed with multiple firearms attacked Al Noor Mosque and Linwood Islamic Centre. He shot 91 people, killing 51, before fleeing the scene and being arrested.
22 February 2017	Kamo, Whangārei	0	5	5	Five people were wounded in a gang-related shooting, including the suspected shooter.
9 March 2016	Kawerau, Bay of Plenty	0	4	4	A man shot at police officers responding to his home after he fired upon a police helicopter investigating a cannabis garden. The man shot and wounded four police officers over a 22-hour standoff before surrendering.
7 May 2009	Napier, Hawke's Bay	2	3	5	Napier shootings: A man shot and killed one police officer and wounded two others as they served a cannabis search warrant at his house. A bystander was also shot as he attempted to assist the officers. After a two-day siege, the shooter was found dead in his home.
6 January 2007	Wainuiomata, Lower Hutt	1	4	5	A man indiscriminately shot and killed one man and injured three others before being wounded and arrested.

== 20th century ==
Date	Location	Dead	Injured	Total	Description
8 February 1997	Raurimu, King Country	6	4	10	Raurimu massacre: A man killed his father at a ski lodge and then shot at people around the area, killing five and wounding four. He was arrested nearby.
17 September 1995	Lower Hutt, Wellington	0	4	4	During a rugby league game at Fraser Park, a man fired a shotgun as a fight occurred, wounding four people.
20 June 1994	Dunedin, Otago	5	0	5	Bain family murders: Five family members (two parents and three of four children) were shot to death at their home. The surviving son was convicted of the murders, but was later acquitted after twelve years in prison.
20 May 1992	Paerata, Auckland Region	7	0	7	Schlaepfer family murders: A man killed six members of his family and himself with two firearms and a knife.
13–14 November 1990	Aramoana, Otago	14	3	17	Aramoana massacre: A man shot neighbours following a verbal dispute before shooting indiscriminately at locals, then at police and members of the Anti-Terrorist Squad (ATS). Thirteen people were killed, including a police officer, and three others were wounded before police shot and killed the gunman.
28 May 1983	Titirangi, Auckland	0	6	6	Six people were injured outside a birthday party.
16 April 1983	Lower Hutt, Wellington	0	4	4	After cutting a man with a glass shard at a hotel bar, a man fired a shotgun at the ceiling, injuring four people with ricochet pellets.
29 July 1976	Upper Hutt, Wellington	0	4	4	Four people were wounded by gunfire during a confrontation between rival gangs.
6 December 1974	Dunedin, Otago	0	4	4	Four people sustained shotgun wounds during a fight outside a tavern.
12 February 1965	Papanui, Canterbury	4	0	4	A man killed his girlfriend and her parents with a .303-calibre rifle before killing himself.
6 January 1963	Auckland, Auckland	3	2	5	A man fired at neighbours from his cottage in Waitākere, killing one person and wounding another. He then killed two police officers responding to the scene. Officers wounded the gunman and arrested him.
22 December 1960	Manurewa, Auckland	1	6	7	A man wounded five policemen and a fireman, before fatally shooting himself.
27 May 1951	Ōtaki, Kāpiti Coast	5	0	5	A man shot and killed a police officer, his wife, two daughters and himself.
29 December 1944	Napier, Hawke's Bay	2	4	6	A man randomly shot at people inside a bar and on the street, killing two people and wounding three others before being shot by police and arrested.
13 November 1944	Tasman, Tasman District	4	0	4	After striking his wife and injuring her, a man killed his four children with a shotgun.
8–9 October 1941	Kowhitirangi, West Coast	8	0	8	1941 Kowhitirangi shootings: A man shot and killed seven people, including four police officers and two soldiers of the Home Guard. The shooter was killed on 20 October during a manhunt.
5 November 1934	Horsham Downs, Waikato	4	0	4	A man shot and killed three family members and himself.
21 October 1934	Morrinsville, Waikato	6	0	6	A man shot and killed four members of his family and a police officer before killing himself.
23 June 1927	Mount Albert, Auckland	4	0	4	A man shot and killed his wife, mother, daughter, and himself with a recently purchased rifle, possibly with the permission of his wife.
19 October 1923	Waikino, Waikato	2	6	8	Waikino schoolhouse shooting: A man shot and killed two students and injured six other over delusions of persecution. It is the first and only mass school shooting in New Zealand history.
26 May 1902	Parnell, Auckland	0	4	4	A man shot and wounded three members of his family before wounding himself.

== See also ==
- List of massacres in New Zealand
- Crime in New Zealand
