= Water resources management in Belize =

- Withdrawals by sector 2000: Domestic: 6.67%; Agriculture: 20%; Industry: 73%
- Renewable water resources: 18.55 km^{3}
- Renewable water resources per capita: 53,156 m^{3}/year
- Wetland designated as Ramsar sites: 236 ha

Water resources management in Belize is carried out by the Water and Sewerage Authority (WASA) in most cases. One of the primary challenges the country is facing with regard to water resources management, however, is the lack of coordinated and comprehensive policies and institutions. Furthermore, there are various areas of water management that are not well addressed at all such as groundwater data and provision of supply. Data on irrigation and drainage is not adequately available either. Demand on water resources is growing as the population increases, new economic opportunities are created, and the agriculture sector expands. This increased demand is placing new threats on the quality and quantity of freshwater resources. Other constant challenge for management entities are the constant threat of floods from tropical storms and hurricanes. The Belize National Emergency Management Organization (NEMO) is charged with flood management as they occur but it is unclear what institution has responsibility for stormwater infrastructures.

Belize is fortunate to have ample water resources with many rivers and lakes as well as groundwater supplies although specific details about groundwater is not well known. Average daily water use in Belize is similar to that of industrialized countries at around 160 L in rural areas to 280 L in urban areas. Industrial processes encompass the largest demand where about 73% of the freshwater resources end up being used in this sector. Water quality in Belize is mostly good except where industry is discharging effluents in urban areas. Most of the groundwater used for supply can be expected to be free of major contaminants. Urban water delivery systems that are connected to WASA's infrastructure are treated and safe; however, this only constitutes about 30% of the systems in Belize.

== Water management challenges ==
Belize has been uniquely endowed with substantial surface and groundwater resources. A dependable tropical/subtropical rainfall pattern in the Northwest Caribbean region replenishes the freshwater resource after extended dry periods, which are often induced by recurrent atmospheric / oceanic phenomena such as the El Niño Southern Oscillation (ENSO), the North Atlantic Oscillation (NAO), and feedback mechanisms associated with climate change. However, increase in demands for freshwater resulting from increasing population, economic activity and agricultural expansion are threatening the quality and availability of freshwater. Coupled with this is the added stress on water resources induced by increasing climatic variability witnessed during the past decade or two. In general, Belize has plenty of high quality water resources yet conflicts over contamination are starting between unrestricted industrial waste and drinking water supply. Hence, the major obstacle for the development and protection of water resources in Belize is the lack of a unique authority responsible for water resources. Joint efforts have been made to create a National Water Commission, but have not yet been successful.

== Water resource base ==
Total water resources are not evaluated accurately because existing data is limited and this is particularly true with respect to groundwater supplies. Annual rainfall varies from 1,500 mm in the North to 4,000 mm in the South. A dry season extends from January to May, followed by a rainy season that peaks in July. In November and December near the end of the rainy season agricultural activities are commonly restricted due to high water saturation levels in the soil.

=== Watersheds ===
Belize has a total of 18 major river catchments with another 16 sub-catchments which drain the Maya Mountains and discharge into the Caribbean Sea. Sixteen principal watersheds have been identified which are roughly grouped into six main watershed regions based on general characteristics of topography, geology, soils, rainfall and land use. The primary watershed regions include: the Northern Watershed Region, the Northeastern, the Central, the Southeastern, the Southwestern, and the Southern Watershed Region.

=== Surface water and groundwater resources ===
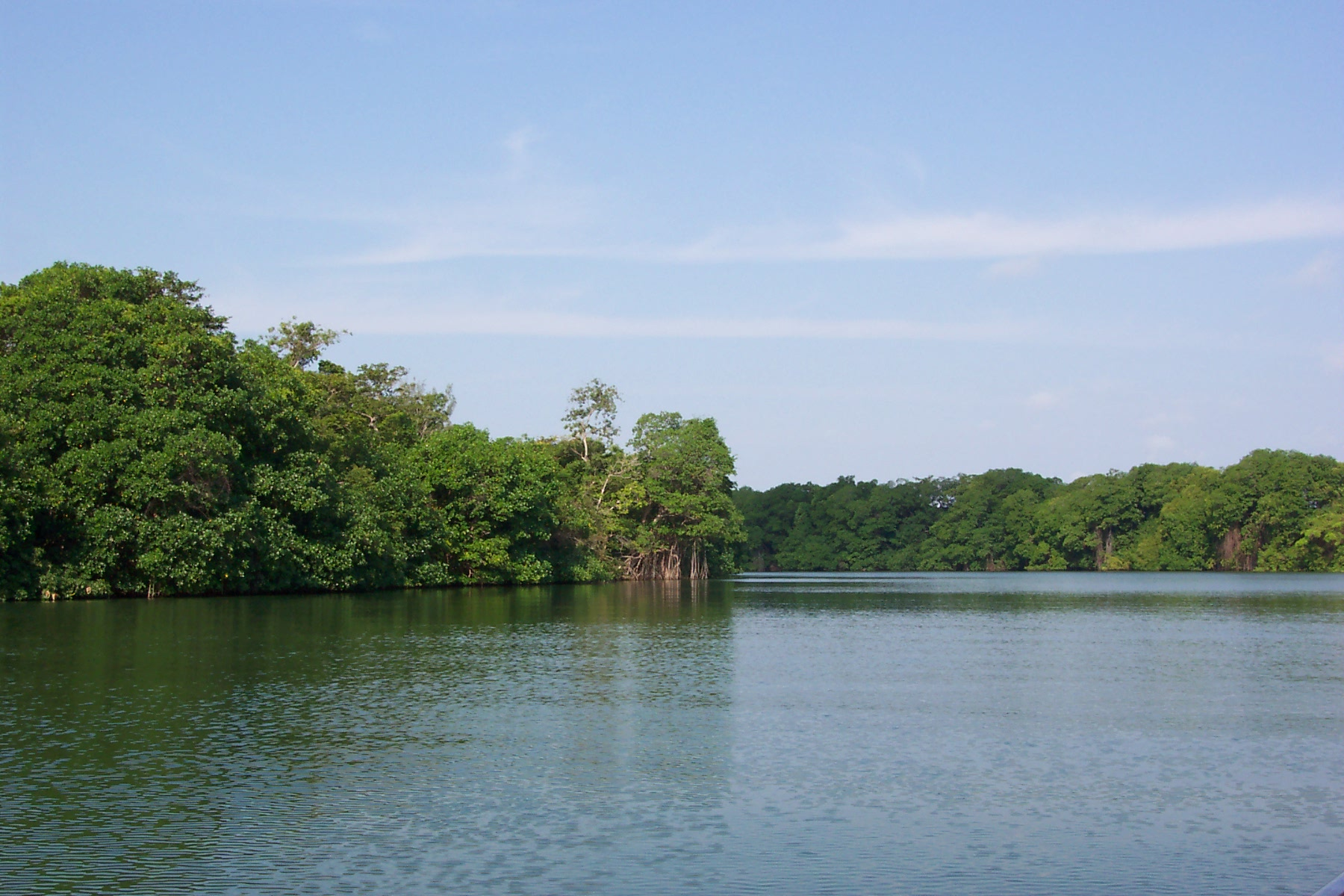
Belize river

For more information, see: List of rivers of Belize

Surface water resources appear to be abundant all over the country except on the Vaca Plateau, where streams disappear in the porous limestone stratum. The northern rivers are meandering streams while the southern rivers have smaller basins and flow more rapidly into the sea. The approximate sum of the quantified river discharges is 15 km^{3} per year, occupying 59% of the territory. Five of Belize's main rivers originate in Mexico and Guatemala where the Rio Hondo forms the northern boundary of the country with Mexico and in the South, the Sarstoon River is the boundary with Guatemala.

The existing groundwater aquifers and their annual recharge rate have not been adequately quantified. In a general sense, groundwater is available throughout the less mountainous areas of Belize and favourable yield can be attributed to geology and climatic conditions. The northern region consists of calcareous sediments that have shown high permeabilities. In the South where limestones are found similar groundwater yield conditions are indicated, while the shales and slates have poor permeability and therefore have low capacity for groundwater extraction. High concentrations of chloride are found along the coast and along rivers that are subject to tidal effects. Chloride waters are evident in some inland wells in the northern half of the country and are likely a result of the dissolution of salts within the calcareous sediments. Large concentrations of hardness and sulphate are evident in some areas, particularly the Corozal District.

=== Water quality ===
While quality problems do exist and it has been Belize's experience that acceptable quality water can be located around the country for primary supply systems with sufficient test drilling. Poor quality groundwater can be expected during the dry season when freshwater recharge from precipitation is negligible, particularly in the North where it extends for three to four months. Water quality in urban areas is good and is constantly monitored by the Water and Sewerage Authority (WASA). The water quality in rural areas such as the districts of Toledo, Stann Creek and Cayo, is not satisfactory. Full water purification takes place only in the systems that are connected to urban WASA systems or about 30%.

== Water resources management by sector ==
=== Water coverage and usage ===
The total water withdrawal of 95 million m^{3}/yr is negligible compared to the available surface water resources. Domestic water consumption per capita is about 240 to 280 liters per day in urban areas and about 160 liters per day in rural areas. This is about equal to the amount consumed in industrialized countries. Seventy percent of the total water used in urban areas is surface water. Groundwater is also used as a source of drinking water in the cities of the Corozal, Orange Walk, Cayo and Toledo Districts and in some rural areas of Toledo and Cayo. Data on specific water sources used by industry is not really available; however, it is assumed that surface water is industry's main water source. The amount of water used for irrigation is estimated to be less than one percent of total water withdrawal.

=== Irrigation and drainage ===
Irrigation in Belize has been marginal because of its climatic and social conditions. Irrigation and drainage information is not thorough or numerous. Likewise, public irrigation and drainage systems are also few and only a small number of private irrigation systems were developed in the 1990s. Surface and sprinkler irrigation is being used for citrus and banana production, and surface irrigation is also used for rice and micro-irrigation of papaya production. It is expected that in the coming years more banana plantations will be irrigated where the estimated water withdrawal may be in the order of 240,000 m^{3}/yr.

The northern zone is relatively flat, with considerable areas of swampland on the coastal plain. Its average annual rainfall is about 1,300 mm and its calcareous soils are suitable for cultivation of a wide variety of crops. These soils may, however, change abruptly to acidic soils in certain areas. The southern zone encompasses the central mountains with flat to undulating coastal belt. The siliceous soils of the mountains are not suited for agriculture due to high soil acidity and poor drainage conditions which constitute key constraints to crop production. In total, only 16% of the land is suitable for sustained agricultural production without skilled management of drainage and soils.

=== Water supply and sanitation ===
In 2015, in Belize 97.1% of the population had access to "improved" water. Regarding sanitation, 90.5% of the population had access to "improved" sanitation, 93.5% and 88.2%, in urban and rural areas, respectively. Around 33 thousand people lacked access to "improved" sanitation, in 2015.

=== Flood management ===
Belize lies directly in the path of tropical storms and hurricanes and they are a consistent occurrence that bring heavy rainfall that challenge flood control management policies and infrastructure. Approximately 62% of the populated settlements in Belize lie within areas at high risk of flooding and many of these are located directly within flood plains that are inundated on an annual basis. The Belize National Emergency Management Organization (NEMO) handles the procedures that are needed during flooding events.

Various technologies are employed to better understand how to prepare and deal with the consistent threat of flooding throughout Belize. The following list are some examples of technology used: enhanced data collection efforts, GIS modeling, information and monitoring center, and a satellite hydrology unit.

=== Hydroelectricity ===
Belize relies on oil imports and Mexican power for the provision of electricity. As a means of import substitution and reducing the average cost of supplying power, proposals have repeatedly been made for hydroelectric development within the country. Belize is well endowed with potential sites for the development of large and small hydroelectric projects, with eight such sites having been identified. A number of small privately owned plants already exist. A major hydroelectric project called El Mollejón at Vaca Falls at the confluence of the Rio On and the Macal River is currently under operation. This dam generates 25.2 MW of electricity for national distribution.

== Legal and institutional framework ==
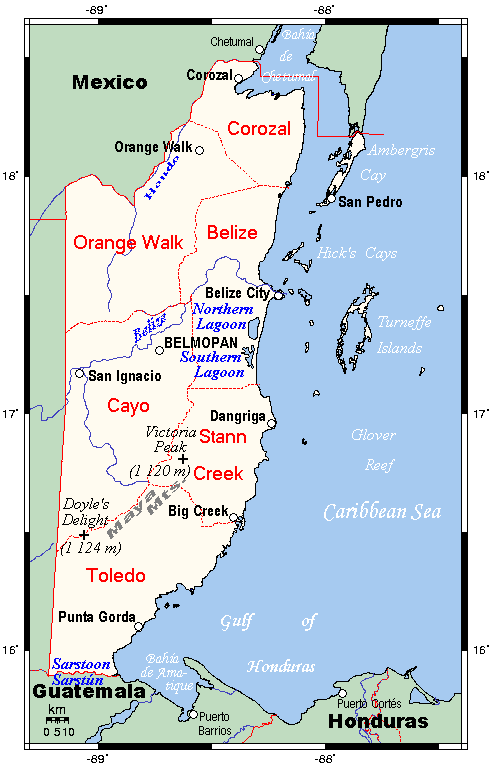
An enlargeable map of Belize

The legal framework in water resources is dispersed and segmented. Certain aspects are taken into consideration and well covered under law while others neglected. The institutional framework faces similar problems. For example, groundwater use and specific management duties are not specifically delegated to any institution. Irrigation is not considered in the Government program at all, perhaps because of its relative small scale. No comprehensive water-quality monitoring program exists in Belize; however, a number of agencies monitor water quality for their own purposes. The Water and Sewerage Ordinance of 1971 established the Water and Sewage Authority (WASA) discussed below.

=== Institutional framework ===
==== Service providers ====
- Water and Sewerage Authority (WASA) is responsible for maintaining and developing waterworks, increasing and improving the water supply and promoting the conservation and proper use of water resources in the country. The company manages water supply systems for nine urban areas and some fifty-six rudimentary systems. WASA also regulates the provision of water supply and sanitation.
- The Belize Water Services is responsible for the provision of potable water to urban and some rural communities.
- The Rural Water Unit is responsible for drilling wells for rural communities and the development of Rudimentary Water Supply Systems
- The Rural Water Supply and Sanitation Department is responsible for providing drinking water and sanitation in the rural areas and is supervised by WASA.

==== Research institutions ====
- The Hydrology Unit within the National Meteorological Service of Belize is responsible for collecting and analyzing data on the quantity, quality, and variability of water resources in Belize. The Hydrology Unit is also responsible for the publication and dissemination of water resources information, provision of hydrological advice for engineering and other water related projects, dissemination of early warning for floods and inundations generated by extreme weather events, and issuing warnings related to dam regulation and dam break. The Hydrology Unit currently manages and maintains 27 hydrological observation sites in all but two of the 18 major watersheds.

== Multi-lateral assistance ==
=== International donor agencies ===
- Pan American Health Organization (PAHO) / World Health Organization (WHO) supports and assists the Belizean Government through the Ministry of Health and by the provision of technical expertise and equipment to the areas of water quality and sanitation. In the late 1990s there was a water quality program that embarked on three areas:
  1. bacteriological quality of drinking water
  2. the national drinking water standards
  3. water quality monitoring and effluents.
- The World Bank closed a project in 2005 that targeted stormwater management and improved flood protection however project evaluations from 2008 deemed the project moderately unsuccessful due to lack of good institutions and sound infrastructure throughout Belize.
- United Nations Children's Fund (UNICEF) has assisted the government in providing safe water from taps and hand pumps and in the construction of latrines in rural areas.
- United States Agency for International Development (USAID) has assisted Belize in strengthening their approach to watershed management and a water quality monitoring program has also been developed.
- The Inter-American Development Bank is preparing an Integrated Water and Sanitation Program with a loan of US $5 million. The loan will complement financing in the construction of a wastewater treatment facility and all associated networks. In addition, the loan will address reforms of the institutional and regulatory arrangements required for the management of the wastewater sector.

== Potential climate change impacts ==
Global Climate Change is predicted to lead to increased extreme climatic events by frequency and magnitude featuring higher temperatures, less frequent but more intense rainfall, rising sea levels leading to coastal inundation. Declines in freshwater resources due to loss of gathering structures and grounds are already occurring in tandem as a result of land demand and exploitation pressures.
