= Imatra shooting =

Shooting incident in Imatra, Finland, on 3-4 December 2016

Coordinates: 61.1713°N 28.7696°E

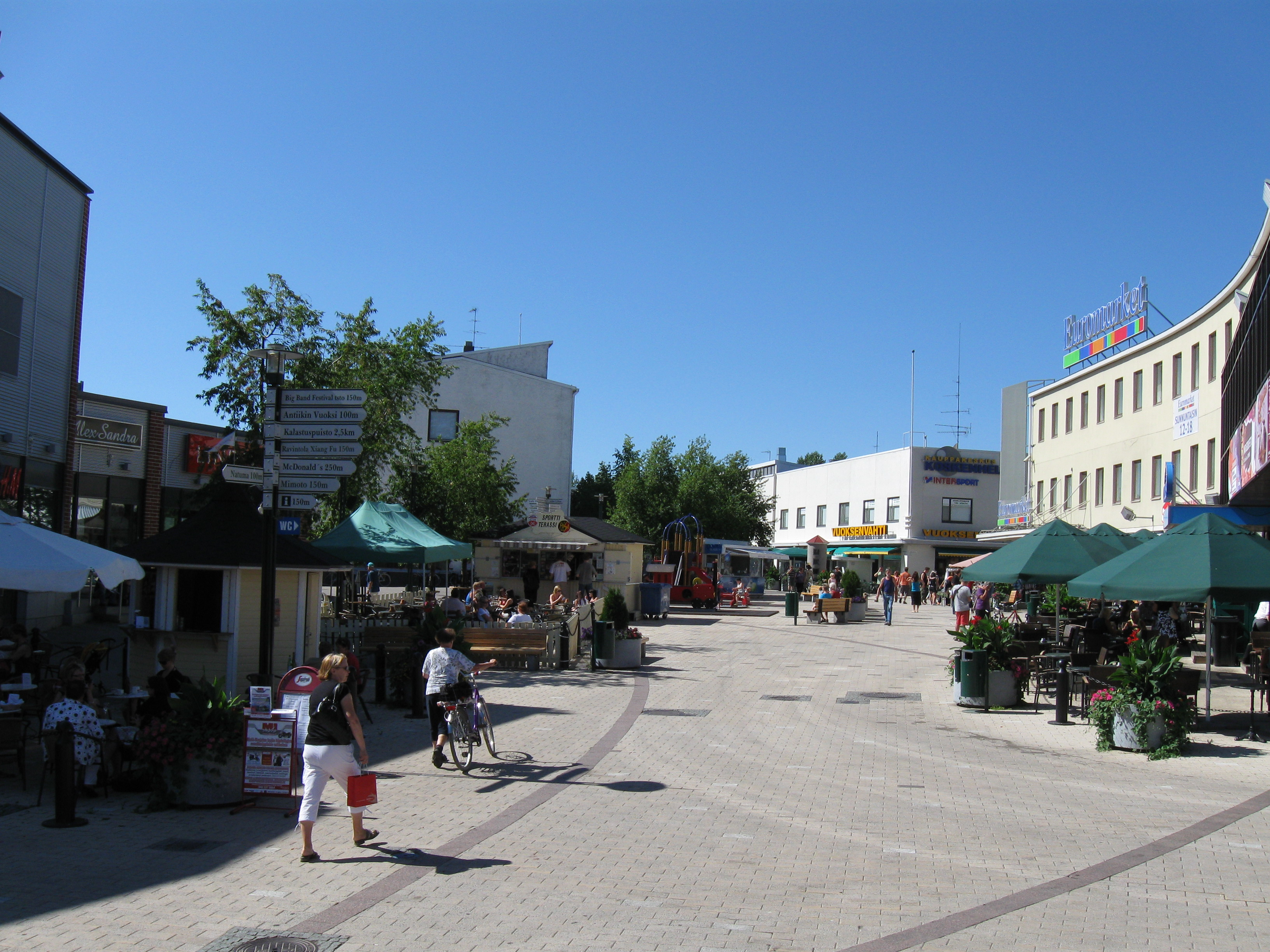
- Koskenparras in 2010. The Vuoksenvahti Restaurant is visible at the street corner in the background.
- Location: Imatra, Finland
- Date: 3 December 2016 c. 23:58 (CET)
- Target: Random
- Attack type: Shooting
- Weapon: Winchester rifle
- Deaths: 3
- Injuries: 0
- Perpetrator: Jori Juhani Lasonen
- Motive: Attempt to get into jail to be safe from "a hitman"

On 3 December 2016, a shooting took place in Imatra, Finland. Three people were killed before the perpetrator, 23-year-old Jori Juhani Lasonen, surrendered to police.

According to the psychological evaluation, Lasonen was not criminally responsible at the time of the shootings. Therefore, the South Karelia District Court did not sentence him to prison, but instead committed him to involuntary psychiatric treatment, as well as a monetary fine of 180,000 euros.

== Background ==
Lasonen had previous criminal records before the shooting, one for attempted murder and another for gross drunk driving.

On December 4th 2014, almost two years before the shooting, Lasonen had witnessed his friend's death. Lasonen himself had called the ambulance for his friend, due to his friend being unconscious. Despite the date of the shooting and Lasonen's friend's date of death being the same, Lasonen claimed there was no correlation between the two.

During the interrogation it became clear that Lasonen believed his computer had been broken into and that there had been a drug debt put on his computer, which led to Lasonen believing a hitman was after him. He reported that he believed to have seen his friend's dead body in a car in front of him, which made him believe he would be killed too. Lasonen said his reason for the shooting was to get into jail to be safe from the hitman he believed to be after him.

== Shooting ==
In the evening of 3 December, at around 23:30, Jori Lasonen spontaneously decided to carry out the planned shooting. He went to his car, a SEAT Ibiza, parked under a suspended tarp as a makeshift garage, and drove it to the actual garage, used by his parents, where the gun safe of Lasonen's father was located, containing a Winchester rifle. After opening the safe and loading the rifle into the trunk of his car, Lasonen drove from his parents' house at about 23:45, headed for Imatra. Lasonen had not thought of a particular location for the shooting, but decided on Koskenparta pedestrian street while driving.

Lasonen arrived on Koskenparta at 23:58, as shown by surveillance footage, and drove to the front of the Vuoksenvahti restaurant and pub. As he was parking, Lasonen saw three women exit the building, and immediately after, he exited the car, opened the trunk and took out the rifle before opening fire on the women. Of the five gunshots, four hit the three women, who were killed instantly, while the fifth hit the ground. The victims sustained multiple injuries in the head and torso and among them was Social Democratic Party politician Tiina Wilén-Jäppinen. Lasonen turned around and attempted to shoot at a K-Supermarket, but the rifle had run out of ammunition. He then placed the rifle back into the trunk and re-entered the car to wait for police to arrive.

A police patrol had been around 200 metres from the scene and arrived at Vuoksenvahti two minutes later at midnight. The doorman of the restaurant identified Lasonen as the shooter, leading to his arrest at 0:04. Lasonen cooperated with the police and obeyed their instructions and his arrest happened without incident.

== Aftermath ==
After the shooting the city decided to open up a crisis center, due to the small size of the city and the weight of the incident.

The shooting gained media attention not only in Finland, but also abroad. The incident was the main news on the Swedish Aftonbladet and Norwegian NRK. The news about the incident also gained traction in Japan and New Zealand. It was initially reported that one of the victims killed was the local mayor, but that error has since been fixed.

The family members of the victims made an association which respects and remembers the victims, the association is called "Valon Vuoksi" (lit. For Light).

== Trial and conviction ==
In the beginning of investigations, Lasonen stayed quiet and refused to speak to the police. On 14 December, 11 days after the shooting, Lasonen finally spoke to the police during which he admitted to the shooting.

During the trial, Lasonen admitted to killing the three women, but argued that they weren't murders. Lasonen also said that he regretted his actions.

During the psychological assessment, Lasonen was found to not be criminally responsible at the time of the shootings. Lasonen was committed into involuntary psychiatric treatment, instead of jail. Lasonen was also ordered to pay a total of 180,000 euros in compensation to the victims' families.
