= List of mass shootings in Belize =

This is a list of mass shootings that have occurred in Belize since the 2000s. Mass shootings are incidents involving several victims of firearm-related violence. This list includes incidents where three or more persons are shot in one location at roughly the same time. For this list, perpetrators are not excluded from casualty tallies. Similarly, shootings in non-public places, and those associated with organised crime, gangs, drug wars, or terrorism are not excluded. (Note: Complete lists of mass shootings in Belize are not officially published, so this list relies on media and unofficial reports. Notes and short citations provided in Nb columns. Short citations in the form Am yy refer to Amandala, review for yyyy (or for split reviews, Am yyi refer to the first part of the review, Am yyii refer to second part, and so on).)

== 2020s ==
Date	District (place)	Dead	Injured	Total	Description	Nb
20 Feb 2026	Belize (Lake Independence)	0	4	4	Four men are shot and injured at a basketball court.	
27 Sep 2025	Belize (Belize)	0	4	4	Three men and a minor were shot and injured in East Canal after two men opened fire on a group of people socializing.	
14 Dec 2024	Toledo (Monkey River)	3	1	4	Two parents and their 3-year-old son were killed, and their 11-year-old daughter injured, by a lone gunman in an evening street shooting while en route home from Indian Creek, Toledo. Motive not clear.	
12 Mar 2024	Cayo (Belmopan)	2	2	4	A woman and an 8-year-old girl were killed, and two other children injured, by a lone gunman in a public afternoon shooting in Market Plaza. Purportedly related to a private feud.	(Note: Am 24i; 7 News 2024b; "Two Dead in Belmopan Mass Shooting, Gunman Apprehended". 7 News. Belize City. 12 March 2024. Not deemed mass shooting by police (7 News 2024b).)
23 Oct 2023	Belize (San Pedro)	3	4	7	Two men and a 3-year-old toddler were killed, and four men injured, in a midnight street shooting at a family residence in San Pedrito. Purportedly drug-related.	(Note: 7 News 2023a; Amandala 2023b; "Police Name Christian Espat and Michael Brown as Suspects in San Pedrito's Deadly Mass Shooting". San Pedro Sun. San Pedro, Belize. 23 October 2023. Police officers suspected of aiding or abetting by victims' family (7 News 2023a).)
4 May 2023	Corozal (Pueblo Nuevo)	0	4	4	Four men were shot and injured during an midday street shootout on Corozal–Progresso Road near Pueblo Nuevo ferry on New River. Purportedly drug-related.	(Note: Amandala 2023h. Plus one drowned (Amandala 2023h).)
21 Jan 2023	Orange Walk (Yo Creek)	1	2	3	E & E Security firm owner was shot and killed, and two of his friends injured, by a lone gunman during an evening street shooting at Lalu Shop. Motive not clear.	
31 Dec 2022	Cayo (Belmopan)	3	1	4	Two men and a woman were killed, and another woman injured, by a lone gunman in an evening street shooting at their residence.	(Note: Am 23i; Am 24i; Amandala 2025d. Police officer charged and tried (Amandala 2025d).)
17 Nov 2022	Belize (Sand Hill)	3	0	3	Three men (including a 19-year-old) were shot and killed in an evening shooting at a family residence in New Site. Purportedly drug-related.	
31 Jul 2022	Stann Creek (Hopkins)	2	8	10	Two men were killed, and eight others (including teenagers and police) injured, by three gunmen in a public evening shooting during a Hopkins Day celebration at Wabinaha Nightclub. Purportedly related to a private feud.	(Note: Amandala 2022a; "Belize: Two Killed in Mass Shooting at Nightclub". Loop. Kingston, Jamaica. 31 July 2022.; News 5 2022a. Deemed mass shooting by police (Amandala 2022a).)
20 Apr 2022	Belize (Belize)	0	4	4	Three men and a woman were injured by two gunmen in an evening street shooting on Plues Street (before a government homeless shelter). Motive not clear.	
12 Feb 2022	Cayo (Belmopan)	1	3	4	A 20-year-old mother was shot and killed, and three of her friends injured, by a lone gunman during a xx street shooting at Stars Restaurant & Club. Purportedly gang-related.	
5 Feb 2022	Belize (Belize)	0	5	5	Three men and two women were injured by a lone gunman in an evening street shooting at a family residence on Antelope Street Extension. Purportedly gang-related.	
17 Mar 2020	Belize (Belize)	1	3	4	One Bowen & Bowen deliveryman was killed, and his colleague and two bystanders injured, by an accompanied gunman (or gunmen) in a daylight street shooting on Orange and West Streets. Motive not clear.	
15 Mar 2020	Belize (Belize)	3	1	4	Two parents and their 4-year-old son were killed, and their 2-year-old daughter injured, by a lone gunman during an evening home invasion at their residence in King's Park. Purportedly burglary-related.	

== 2010s ==
Date	District (place)	Dead	Injured	Total	Description	Nb
20 Jun 2019	Belize (Mapp Caye)	5	0	5	Five fishermen (including a 19-year-old) were shot and killed during a days-long lobster fishing trip. Purportedly drug-related.	(Note: 7 News 2019n; "Triple Murder at Sea; Bodies of 3 Fishermen Recovered". News 5. Belize City. 21 June 2019. First victim discovered on 20 June (7 News 2019n).)
4 Jun 2019	Belize (Price Hwy)	3	0	3	A school principal and her two friends (including a 19-year-old) were shot and killed at the former's residence on Mile 10½ (before Burrell Boom, Belize). Motive not clear.	(Note: Amandala 2019e. Victims discovered 4 June (Amandala 2019e).)
26 Jun 2018	Orange Walk (Trial Farm)	0	4	4	Three men (including a 19-year-old) and a woman (pregnant) were injured by a lone gunman in an evening street shooting at a family residence on San Narciso Street. Motive not clear.	
2 May 2018	Belize (Belize)	0	4	4	Three men and a woman were injured by an accompanied gunman in a public evening shooting at Wing Kee Salon Store on Faber's Road. Motive not clear.	
9 Sep 2017	Belize (Belize)	0	6	6	Six people were injured by a lone gunman in a public afternoon shooting just after a j'ouvert parade on Kerry and Wilson Streets (before an Adventist church holding Saturday service). Purportedly related to a private feud.	
12 Aug 2017	Belize (San Pedro)	0	3	3	A man and two children were injured by two gunmen in an evening street shooting at the Easy Does It A & A Woodwork Shop in San Pedrito. Motive not clear.	
14 May 2016	Belize (Ladyville)	1	3	4	Three men were injured by three gunmen during a midnight shooting at a private residence on Marage Road, during which one of the gunmen was shot and killed by return fire. Purportedly gang-related.	
30 Apr 2016	Cayo (Santa Elena)	2	1	3	A cosmetologist and her employee were shot and killed, and an Anchor security guard injured, by the said guard in a public afternoon shooting at Betty’s Beauty Salon. Purportedly related to a private feud.	
17 Sep 2014	Belize (Belize)	2	2	4	A man was shot and killed, and three injured (one fatally), by a lone gunman during an evening street shooting at St Mary's Primary School on Angel Lane. Purportedly gang-related.	
8 Jun 2014	Belize (Belize)	1	4	5	A man was killed, and four people injured, by gunmen in a shootout during a graduation party in Brown Sugar Plaza. Purportedly gang-related.	
15 Jun 2012	Belize (Belize)	1	3	4	A man was killed, and two men and a 16-year-old girl injured, by two gunmen in an evening school shooting at Living Hope Prep, on Neal Pen Road. Purportedly gang-related.	
8 Jun 2012	Belize (Belize)	2	4	6	Two men were shot and killed, and four (including two bystanders) injured, during a public evening shootout with gunmen at Elements Pool & Bar in Newtown Barracks. Purportedly gang-related.	
10 May 2012	Belize (Belize)	1	2	3	A barber's patron was shot and killed, and a second patron and an armed robber shot and injured, by the latter and a second armed accomplice during an attempted evening robbery at Dale's Barbershop on West Canal and Bishop Street.	
4 May 2012	Belize (Belize)	0	3	3	Three men were shot and injured by a lone gunman during an evening street shooting on Bocotora Street. Motive not clear.	
10 Sep 2011	Cayo (Santa Elena)	1	3	4	An Asian grocer was shot and killed, and two grocers and a shop attendant injured, by two gunmen during an evening armed robbery of The Brothers Supermarket on Western Highway.	
7 Sep 2010	Orange Walk (Carmelita)	3	0	3	Two parents and their son were shot and killed at or near their residence. Motive not clear.	(Note: News 5 2010c. Victims discovered on 7 September (News 5 2010c).)
5 Mar 2010	Belize (Belize)	0	5	5	Four adults and an 8-year-old boy were shot and injured by a lone gunman in an evening street shooting on Water Lane. Motive not clear.	
1 Feb 2010	Belize (Belize)	1	3	4	A 19-year-old teenager was killed, and three bystanders (including a senior and child) injured, by two gunmen in a public evening shooting at Rick's Chinese Shop on CA Boulevard. Motive not clear.	

== 2000s ==
Date	District (place)	Dead	Injured	Total	Description	Nb
26 Nov 2008	Cayo (Santa Elena)	0	3	3	A 50-year-old man and two others were injured by a lone gunman on a motorcycle during an evening street shooting on Carmen Street. Motive not clear.	
14 Feb 2008	Belize (Belize)	2	1	3	Two Esso employees were killed (18- and 19-year-olds), and another injured, by one or two gunmen in an evening street shooting on Gill Street. Motive not clear.	
9 Feb 2008	Belize (Belize)	2	13	15	Putt Putt shootings: A 19-year-old bartender was killed, and nine bystanders (including teenagers) injured, by two gunmen in a public evening shooting at the Putt Putt Bar & Grill in Newtown Barracks. Five uninjured victims from Putt Putt were later shot by a lone gunman on Bel-Can Bridge, leaving a 17-year-old dead, and three (including teenagers) injured. Similarly, three uninjured victims from Putt Putt were later shot by a lone gunman on Raccoon Street Extension, leaving a 16-year-old injured. All three shootings purportedly connected and gang-related.	(Note: Amandala 2022a; News 5 2022a; "Friday Night Mayhem at Putt Putt Bar". 7 News. Belize City. 11 February 2008.; "Two Dead, Thirteen Injured in Gang Shooting Sprees". News 5. Belize City. 11 February 2008. Deemed mass shooting by police (Amandala 2022a).)
20 May 2007	Belize (Belize)	1	2	3	An Asian grocer was killed, and her two children (9- and 11-year-olds) injured, by a lone gunman during a morning armed robbery on Basra and George Streets.	
16 Apr 2007	Belize (Belize)	0	3	3	A man, a 19-year old teen, and a 10-year-old boy were injured by a lone gunman during an evening street shooting on Rivero Street and Kraal Road. Purportedly related to a private feud.	
3 Dec 2006	Belize (Belize)	1	3	4	A father of two was killed, and two others injured, by at least two gunmen in a green car during an evening street shooting on West Street. The gunmen had earlier shot and injured a third victim on Faber's Road. Both shootings purportedly connected; motive not clear.	
13 Nov 2006	Belize (Belize)	1	2	3	A recent US deportee was killed, and two others injured, by cycling gunmen during an afternoon street shooting on Euphrates Avenue. Motive not clear.	
14 May 2006	Belize (Belize)	2	2	4	Two brothers were killed, and two others injured, during a predawn shooting by gunmen at their residence on Albert Street West. Purportedly related to a private feud.	
4 Dec 2004	Belize (Belize)	0	5	5	Four adults and a 9-year-old boy were injured by two gunmen during an evening street shooting on Kraal Road. Motive not clear.	
28 Aug 2004	Belize (Belize)	3	1	4	Two market vendors and a KBH security guard were killed, and a cabbie injured, by the said guard during a public morning shooting in Central Market. Purportedly related to a private feud.	
20 Jul 2002	Belize (Belize)	0	3	3	Three bystanders were injured by gunmen in an evening street shootout on Faber's Road and CA Boulevard. Motive not clear.	
18 Jun 2002	Belize (Belize)	4	1	5	Two KBH security guards and two bystanders were shot and killed, and a third KBH security guard shot and injured, by two gunmen during an evening armed robbery of a Bowen & Bowen distribution centre on Slaughterhouse Road.	(Note: News 5 2002o. Plus at least one KBH security guard beaten while being bound (News 5 2002o).)
12 Mar 2002	Cayo (Cotton Tree)	2	2	4	A father and a family friend were killed, and a 14-year-old girl and her friend injured, by the said family friend during a midday street shooting at the village bus stop on Western Highway. Motive not clear.	
23 Sep 2001	Belize (Belize)	0	3	3	Two men were shot and injured by gunmen in an evening street shooting on Hondo and Nargusta Streets. A third was later shot and injured at his residence on Antelope Street. Both shootings purportedly connected; motive not clear.	
11 Jun 2001	Belize (Belize)	0	3	3	Three men were shot and injured by two gunmen in an evening street shooting on CA Boulevard and Ebony Street. Purportedly gang-related.	
30 May 2000	Toledo (Punta Gorda)	5	2	7	Five passengers were shot and killed, and at least the skipper and a sixth passenger shot and injured, by three allegedly Guatemalan hijackers aboard the ferry Mariestela on her return to Punta Gorda from Puerto Barrios, Guatemala. Motive not clear.	(Note: News 5 2000m. Plus injured skipper presumed drowned (News 5 2000m).)
11 Mar 2000	Belize (Belize)	1	2	3	A 19-year-old teen was shot and killed, and a 13-year-old girl and a 14-year-old boy shot and injured, by a lone gunman during a street shooting at the former's residence on Mahogany Street Extension. Purportedly related to a private feud.	(Note: News 5 2000q. Plus the 19-year-old and his sibling prior injured by cut and stab wounds (News 5 2000q).)

== See also ==
- Lists of mass shootings by country

== Notes and references ==
=== References ===
1. "Narco Triple Murder Claims 3-Year-Old". 7 News. Belize City. 23 October 2023.
2. "Mother and Minor Murdered at the Market". 7 News. Belize City. 13 March 2024.
3. "The Swallow Caye 5: All Killed at Sea". 7 News. Belize City. 24 June 2019.
4. "Mass Shooting in Hopkins: 2 Dead, 8 Injured". Amandala. Belize City. 6 August 2022.
5. "Suspects Charged for San Pedro Triple Murder". Amandala. Belize City. 29 October 2023.
6. "Elmer Nah Triple-Murder Case Begins". Amandala. Belize City. 20 April 2025.
7. "Heinous Triple Murder in Home at Mile 10½". Amandala. Belize City. 8 June 2019.
8. "Year in Review". Amandala. Belize City. 2004–2024.
9. "1 Dead, 4 Injured After a Shootout in the North". Amandala. Belize City. 10 May 2023.
10. "Hopkins Day is Marred by Another Mass Shooting". News 5. Belize City. 2 August 2022.
11. "In Cold Blood: Husband, Wife and Son, Murdered in Carmelita". News 5. Belize City. 8 September 2010.
12. "Hijacking at Sea Leaves Six Dead". News 5. Belize City. 31 May 2000.
13. "4 Dead, Pair of Killers on the Loose". News 5. Belize City. 19 June 2002.
14. "Shooting Spree Leaves One Dead and Several Injured". News 5. Belize City. 13 March 2000.
