= Murder of Jenna Lepomäki =

2011 murder of Finnish woman

- Date: June 2011
- Attack type: Homicide
- Deaths: 1
- Victims: Jenna Lepomäki, aged 18
- Perpetrators: Joona Mikael Hasselqvist; Joel Aarne Esaias Lilo
- Sentence: Life imprisonment

Jenna Lepomäki was an 18-year-old Finnish woman, who was found dead in Fuengirola, Spain, on 6 October 2011.

Lepomäki was last seen alive in June 2011. After months of searching, her mummified body was found in the terrain, wrapped in a sleeping bag, in October 2011. The Finnish Criminal Police investigated the matter in conjunction with the Espoo police and the Spanish police. Three days after the discovery of the body, 19-year-old Joona Mikael Hasselqvist and 20-year-old Joel Aarne Esaias Lilo were arrested, suspected of having killed Lepomäki. They were subsequently charged with murder.

Because Hasselqvist and Lilo were from Tampere, the process started on 5 June 2012 in the Pirkanmaa District Court, where they were charged with murder and illegal possession of drugs. According to the prosecution, Hasselqvist and Lilo had tried to enlist Lepomäki as a drug courier, but after she refused and reported the matter to the Guardia Civil, Hasselqvist and Lilo decided to kill her. On 24 August 2012, Hasselqvist and Lilo were sentenced to life imprisonment for murder. Hasselqvist was also sentenced for fraud and illegal possession of drugs, and Lilo for fraud, money laundering and illegal possession of drugs. Hasselqvist's stepfather was also sentenced to two years in prison without parole for illegal possession of drugs. His mother was sentenced to prison with parole.

The sentence was appealed to the Turku Court of Appeal. The court gave its sentence in October 2013, where it decided that the crime was manslaughter and assisted manslaughter instead of murder. According to the court, the killing had not been pre-meditated. The reasons for this included that the crime had happened in the perpetrator's apartment, where it had been difficult to remove the traces of the crime. Furthermore, there was no evidence that Lepomäki had been enticed to the apartment in order to kill her. Joona Hasselqvist's sentence was lowered to 12 years in prison for manslaughter, and Joel Lilo's sentence was lowered to 6 years in prison for assisted manslaughter. The sentences differed, because the district court judge had sentenced both for murder. After the sentence had been declared, Lilo was released, because Finnish law grants parole for crimes committed under the age of 21 after one third of the sentence has been served.

Lilo's parole caused disapproval among the public, because after being paroled, he disgraced Lepomäki's on-line memorial with indecent comments. Lepomäki's father reported this to the Finnish police, and Lilo was arrested for a few days suspected of dishonouring Lepomäki's memory. According to Parliament of Finland member Kari Tolvanen, the Finnish criminal law should be changed in regards to first-time offenders, and he left a proposal of the matter. Minister of Interior Päivi Räsänen remarked that according to her, the notion of first-time offenders should be removed entirely in cases of serious crimes. Former Minister of Justice Tuija Brax has a more negative view in regard to altering the law.

The prosecutor and Lepomäki's family sought permission to appeal the sentence to the Finnish Supreme Court. The court declined permission, so the sentence from the Turku Court of Appeal stayed.

== See also ==
- List of solved missing person cases: post–2000
