= Life imprisonment in Finland =

In Finland, life imprisonment is the maximum criminal penalty. In actual practice, life imprisonment as a sentence lasts for the remainder of a convict's life. The sentence currently consists of imprisonment in closed prison and possible periods of imprisonment in a halfway house, with supervised parole for 6 months and full parole becoming available after 12 years. The death penalty was abolished in Finland in 1949 for peacetime offences and for all offences in 1972.

Life imprisonment is the mandatory penalty for murder and a possible penalty for treason, high treason, espionage, the crime of aggression, war crimes, genocide, crimes against humanity, and terrorism resulting in death.

Under the decree on the execution of penalties issued in conjunction with the original Finnish Criminal Code of 1889, life imprisonment consisted of at least 12 years of imprisonment, after which the convict was eligible for parole. The parolee would remain on probation for the rest of their sentence, meaning the rest of their life. In 1921, the probationary period was fixed at eight years and from 1931, release could only be obtained through presidential clemency. By the early 2000s it was all but standard practice for life prisoners to eventually be granted clemency and released.

Currently, a life prisoner may be released on parole no earlier than after having served 12 years, 10 years if serving a life sentence for a crime committed under the age of 21. They may however be released on supervised parole up to 6 months prior to being released on full parole. Since 2006, parole applications by life prisoners have been processed by the Helsinki Court of Appeal (Helsingin hovioikeus). The court can start processing a parole application at earliest two years before the potential date of release, and if the parole application is rejected, the prisoner can file a new application after one year. If parole is granted, the probationary period lasts for 3 years. A parolee that commits a crime during this period is not returned to prison for an indefinite term, but if the crime results in an actual prison sentence, the parolee is sentenced as if they had 3 years left to serve of a fixed-term prison sentence. Juveniles cannot be sentenced to life imprisonment in Finland, the maximum penalty for crimes committed under the age of 18 is 12 years of imprisonment for a single crime, 15 years for multiple crimes.

As of 2025, the longest period of incarceration for a single life sentence under the current system has been 22 years, served by Pasi Räty for the murder and robbery of a disabled 74-year-old man. A month after his release in 2012, Räty committed another murder, for which he received a new life sentence. He was denied parole in 2025. In an earlier era a longer period in prison was served by Vilho Huovinen, who had initially been sentenced to death in 1946 for two robbery-murders he committed after having escaped from prison, where he had been serving a life sentence for a previous murder. Huovinen was released in 1969, having served over 25 years in prison, 23 years continuously. The average duration of a life sentence has been 14.5 years.
