= Fiskebøl =

Village in Hadsel Municipality, Norway

- Village
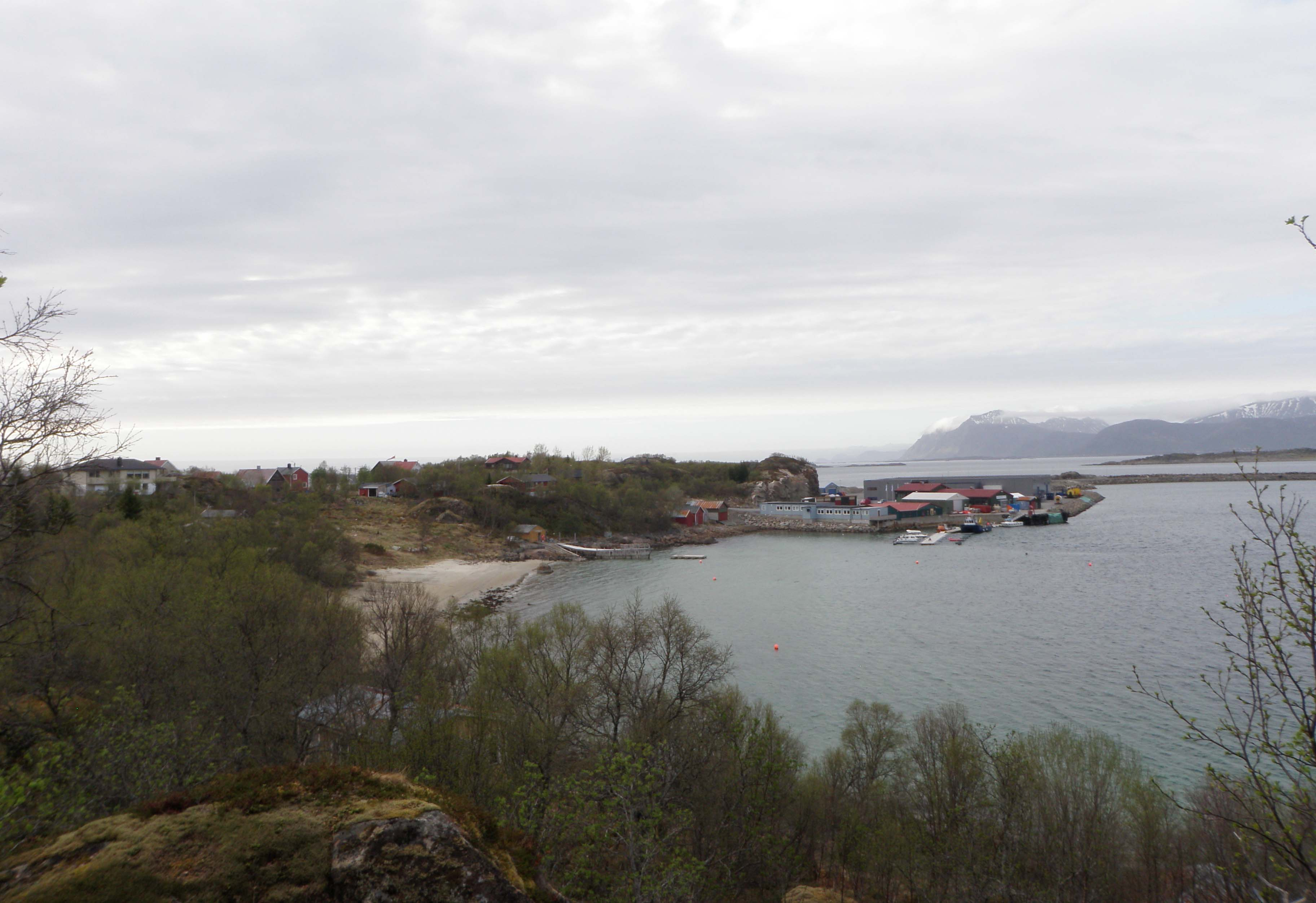
- View of the village from a nearby hill to the southwest
- Interactive map of Fiskebøl
- Location within Nordland Location within Norway
- Coordinates: 68.4292°N 14.8197°E
- Country: Norway
- Region: Northern Norway
- County: Nordland
- District: Vesterålen
- Municipality: Hadsel Municipality
- Elevation: 11 m (36 ft)
- Time zone: UTC+01:00 (CET)
  - Summer (DST): UTC+02:00 (CEST)
- Post Code: 8317 Strønstad

Fiskebøl is a village in Hadsel Municipality in Nordland county, Norway. The village is located on the island of Austvågøya on the southern shore of the Hadselfjorden. It has a ferry quay for the Melbu–Fiskebøl Ferry. The village is located just west of the Sloverfjord Tunnel where the European route E10 crosses the Sloverfjorden.

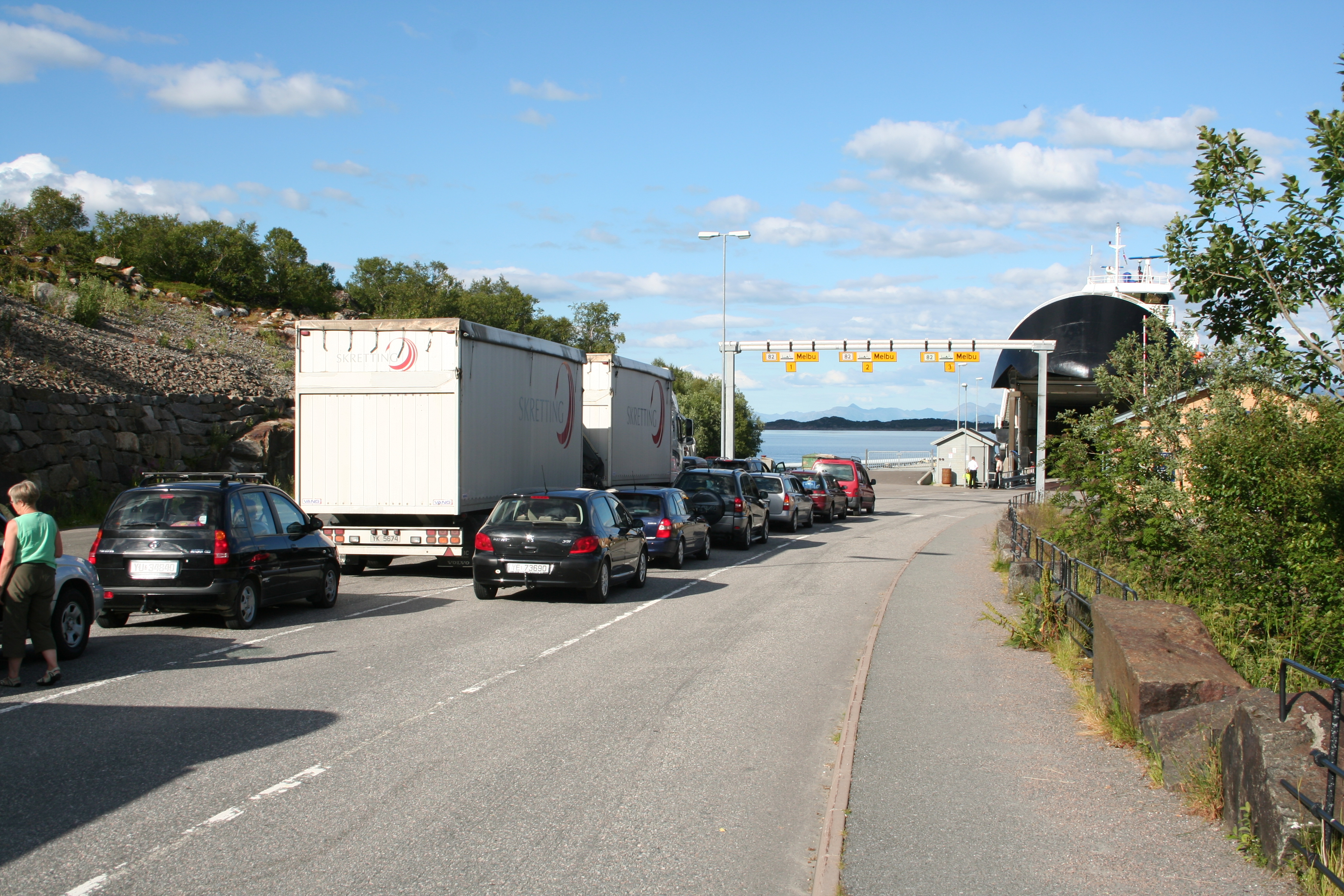
The ferry quay at Fiskebøl
