= List of mass shootings in Belgium =

This article is a list of mass shootings in Belgium. Mass shootings are firearm-related violence with at least four casualties.

The data includes casualties of perpetrators, including self-inflicted gunshot or shooting of a perpetrator by police. The treatment of perpetrator casualties is at variance to some but not all definitions of a mass shooting used in the United States. The inclusion of injured victims in the data is also at variance with some of the US definitions that only include dead victims. However, the above treatment is consistent with that used in other Wikipedia lists of mass shootings by country.

== 21st century ==
Date	Location	Dead	Injured	Total	Description
8 October 2025	City of Brussels, Brussels	0	4	4	Two teenagers opened fire and wounded four people before being taken into custody after a police chase.
18 July 2025	Sint-Niklaas, East Flanders	0	4	4	Four men were found wounded by police responding to calls of gunfire. Five male suspects were arrested after their car was tracked down in Antwerp.
26 June 2024	Saint-Gilles, Brussels	2	3	5	Two people were shot and killed with three others injured in a gang-related shooting at a cafe next to the Brussels-Midi railway station.
6 December 2023	City of Brussels, Brussels	0	5	5	Five people were shot and injured in a gang-related shooting.
9 January 2023	Antwerp, Antwerp Province	1	3	4	An 11-year-old girl was killed and her father wounded, along with two siblings, when shots were fired into a house. Two suspects are sought.
29 May 2018	Liège, Liège Province	4 (Note: Including the perpetrator or suspect)	4	8	2018 Liège attack: A prisoner on temporary leave from prison, stabbed two female police officers, took their guns, shot and killed them and a civilian. The gunman then took a woman hostage, shot and injured four other police officers before he was killed by police.
24 May 2014	City of Brussels, Brussels	4	0	4	Jewish Museum of Belgium shooting: A man shot and killed four people at the Jewish Museum of Belgium in an antisemitic Islamist terrorist attack.
13 December 2011	Liège, Liège Province	7	147	154	2011 Liège attack: A man threw grenades and fired an FN FAL rifle at civilians on the Place Saint-Lambert. The attack killed five and left one hundred and forty seven others injured, seven seriously. The man killed himself at the scene with a revolver. Earlier that day, he had also murdered a woman in his house.
30 April 2011	Antwerp, Antwerp Province	2	4	6	Six people were shot, two fatally, in a gang-related shooting at a café.
11 May 2006	Antwerp, Antwerp Province	2	2	4	2006 Antwerp shooting: A man shot and killed two people and injured another, before being shot and incapacitated by police.
20 May 2004	Sint-Gillis-Waas, East Flanders	1	3	4	A man returned with a gun to a café after being kicked out and opened fire, killing a man and wounding three other people.
7 May 2002	Brussels	3	2	5	A right-wing extremist intruded into his Moroccan neighbours' apartment and opened fire, killing both parents and wounding two of their children. After setting the residence on fire, police shot and killed him.

== 20th century ==
Date	Location	Dead	Injured	Total	Description
6 August 1998	Malonne, Namur Province	1	5	6	A man fired from a car at people outside a nightclub, wounding six people, one of whom died of her injuries.
4 April 1993	Saint-Josse-ten-Noode, Brussels	0	4	4	Three shooters fired at the entrance of a dance hall, wounding four people.
6 August 1991	Beloeil, Hainaut Province	5	0	5	Two adults and three children were found tied up and shot to death with rifles in a forested area. A 27-year-old suspect was arrested.
12 May 1987	Bogaarden, Flemish Brabant & Denderwindeke, East Flanders	8	3	11	1987 Bogaarden shooting: A man entered a farm in Bogaarden, killing five members of a family and wounding a sixth. Before fleeing, he also killed a woman and her son for apparently having witnessed the shooting. During the manhunt, the fugitive shot and injured two of his in-laws before killing himself when police located him.
9 November 1985	Aalst, East Flanders	8	15	23	Brabant killers: A series of armed and violent supermarket robbery by a group of unidentified criminals referred to as the Brabant killers. A total of 28 people died and 22 were injured in their attacks.
27 September 1985	Braine-l'Alleud, Walloon Brabant	3	2	5	Brabant killers: A series of armed and violent supermarket robbery by a group of unidentified criminals referred to as the Brabant killers. A total of 28 people died and 22 were injured in their attacks.
27 September 1985	Overijse. Flemish Brabant	5	1	6	Brabant killers: A series of armed and violent supermarket robbery by a group of unidentified criminals referred to as the Brabant killers. A total of 28 people died and 22 were injured in their attacks.
23 August 1981	Ostend, West Flanders	3	1	4	A man opened fire in a cafe, killing two and wounding one before fatally shooting himself.
18 November 1979	Hannut, Liège Province	2	26	28	A soldier on leave fired a rifle into a crowd at a cross country race, killing two people and wounding twenty-six others.
23 June 1973	Sint-Amandsberg, East Flanders	5	0	5	Steyaert family murders: Two men shot and killed a family of five.
5 November 1953	Thy-le-Château, Namur Province	6	0	6	Amidst a prolonged dispute between neighbors, a man broke into three houses, fatally shooting three men and cutting the throats of two women before killing himself.
12 September 1951	Brussels	2	2	4	During a meeting to discuss his termination, a teacher shot and killed one person and wounded two others before killing himself.
14 July 1942	Houdeng, Hainaut Province	12	0	12	A chemist shot and killed eleven German Gestapo agents who were trying to arrest him, before killing himself.

== See also ==
- Crime in Belgium
