= List of mass shootings in Denmark =

This article is a list of mass shootings in Denmark. Mass shootings are firearm-related violence with at least four casualties.

The data includes casualties of perpetrators, including self-inflicted gunshot or shooting of a perpetrator by police. The treatment of perpetrator casualties is at variance to some but not all definitions of a mass shooting used in the United States. The inclusion of injured victims in the data is also at variance with some of the US definitions that only include dead victims. However, the above treatment is consistent with that used in other Wikipedia lists of mass shootings by country.

== 21st century ==
Date	Location	Dead	Injured	Total	Description
26 August 2023	Copenhagen, Capital Region	1	4	5	Two men shot and killed a man and wounded four others in a gang-related shooting in Freetown Christiania.
3 July 2022	Copenhagen, Capital Region	3	7	10	2022 Copenhagen mall shooting: A man armed with a rifle shot and killed three people and injured seven others at a shopping mall in Ørestad.
7 October 2016	Copenhagen, Capital Region	1	3	4	A man shot and killed a man and wounded three others in a gang-related shooting in Østerbro.
14–15 February 2015	Copenhagen, Capital Region	3 (Note: Including the perpetrator or suspect)	5	8	2015 Copenhagen shootings: An Islamic extremist commits three shootings around in Copenhagen in which he shot and killed two people and wounded five police officers.
2 March 2009	Copenhagen, Capital Region	1	3	4	Two men shot and killed one person and wounded three others at a café in Amager.
5 November 2006	Copenhagen, Capital Region	1	3	4	A man shot and killed one person and wounded three others at a café in Nørrebro.
21 April 2005	Copenhagen, Capital Region	1	3	4	Multiple gunmen fired rifles and a handgun in a revenge attack in Christiania, killing a man and wounding three others.
29 March 2003	Slagelse, Zealand Region	4	0	4	A doctor shot and killed his wife, two daughters and himself with a hunting rifle.

== 20th century ==
Date	Location	Dead	Injured	Total	Description
22 October 1998	Holsted Stationsby, Southern Denmark	4	0	4	A man shot himself along with his family after he was exposed as a serial rapist who raped three elderly women in Holsted, Jutland.
7 June 1997	Liseleje, Capital Region	1	3	4	A shooting incident outside a cafe during the Nordic Biker War, left one Bandidos member dead and three others wounded.
29 November 1996	Copenhagen, Capital Region	1	3	4	A man opened fire at a cafe, killing one person and wounding three others.
10 March 1996	Copenhagen, Capital Region	1	3	4	1996 Copenhagen Airport shooting: Six members of the Hells Angels Motorcycle Club ambushed four rival Bandidos Motorcycle Club members outside Copenhagen Airport, killing one man and wounding three others. A twin attack was also carried out at Oslo Airport, Fornebu in Norway within an hour of the Denmark shooting. The incident occurred during the Nordic Biker War (1994–97).
24 December 1995	Valby, Capital Region	2	8	10	A man armed with a handgun opened fire towards the ceiling during a wedding party. The bullets ricocheted towards the guests killing two and wounding at least eight others.
5 April 1994	Aarhus, Mid-Jutland	3	2	5	Aarhus University shooting: A man shot and killed two female students at Aarhus University and injured two others before he committed suicide. It remains the only school shooting that has occurred in Denmark.
3 June 1991	Magleby, Zealand Region	5	0	5	A man used a shotgun to kill his wife, three children and himself.
3 March 1991	Helsingør, Capital Region	2	2	4	A man armed with a shotgun killed his ex-girlfriend's new boyfriend and wounded his ex-girlfriend and her brother, before killing himself.
1 January 1990	Narsaq, Kujalleq, Greenland	7	1	8	Narsaq massacre: A man shot and killed seven people and injured another at a New Years party following a verbal dispute with a friend. The man feeling betrayed by the dispute, went home before returning to the party armed with a semiautomatic rifle with the intention to kill all attendants and commit suicide afterwards. It is the worst mass shooting in Greenland's history.
13 August 1989	Aarhus, Mid-Jutland	4	0	4	A man armed with a rifle killed his son in Viby before travelling to Hornslet where he killed his ex-wife and her new partner. The man killed himself during a shootout with the police in Odder.
28 April 1989	Copenhagen, Capital Region	5 (Note: Two by stabbing)	3	8	A man armed with a revolver and a knife shot and killed his daughter and ex-wife. The man then stabbed two of his ex-wife's friends to death. He then went on a random shooting spree, wounding three others before killing himself.
11 February 1983	Torsted, Mid-Jutland	4	0	4	A man shot and killed his wife and two children. He then set the house on fire and killed himself.
30 May 1981	Aarhus, Mid-Jutland	2	2	4	A man armed with a handgun opened fire in a restaurant, killing two and wounding two others.
1 March 1981	Nørrebro, Capital Region	1	4	5	A gang-related shooting incident inside a cafe killed one person and wounded four others.
11 August 1976	Horsens, Mid-Jutland	2	3	5	A man armed with a shotgun opened fire at a sporting goods store, killing two people and wounding three others.
4 May 1972	Bramming, Southern Denmark	2	3	5	A Turkish man armed with a rifle killed his ex-girlfriend's parents and wounded his ex-girlfriend and her brother, before attempting to kill himself.
5 March 1971	Copenhagen, Capital Region	2	2	4	An American bartender opened fire inside a restaurant killing two patrons and wounding two others.
13 May 1969	Vejle, Southern Denmark	5	0	5	A man armed with a handgun killed his wife, three children and himself.
19 July 1966	Ørsbjerg, Southern Denmark	4	0	4	A man shot and killed his parents and an older brother, before litting their home on fire and shooting himself fatally.
17 September 1965	Copenhagen, Capital Region	4	0	4	1965 Copenhagen shooting: A man shot and killed four police officers with a handgun during a chase in Amager.
3 February 1964	Tingerup, Zealand Region	3	1	4	A man killed his three children and wounded his wife before being arrested.
1 September 1961	Brande, Mid-Jutland	3	1	4	A teenager armed with an automatic handgun shot and killed a woman and her child, wounded a police officer and committed suicide.
24 May 1955	Copenhagen, Capital Region	4	1	5	A man armed with a revolver shot and killed his accountant and his accountant's wife. The man then went to his ex-wife's apartment where he killed her and wounded her mother. The man fatally shot himself when police tried to arrest him.
10 March 1948	Copenhagen, Capital Region	3	1	4	A policeman shot and killed his three children with a handgun, before non-fatally shooting himself in Sundby.

== See also ==
- Crime in Denmark
