= Nappa, Finland =

Residential area in Kouvola, Finland

Coordinates: 60°51′N 26°35′E

Nappa is a village in northern Kymenlaakso. It emerged in mid-17th century arising from the residential area and is now part of Kouvola and has grown to more than a thousand inhabitants.
