= Criminal Code of Finland =

Act codifying the criminal law in Finland

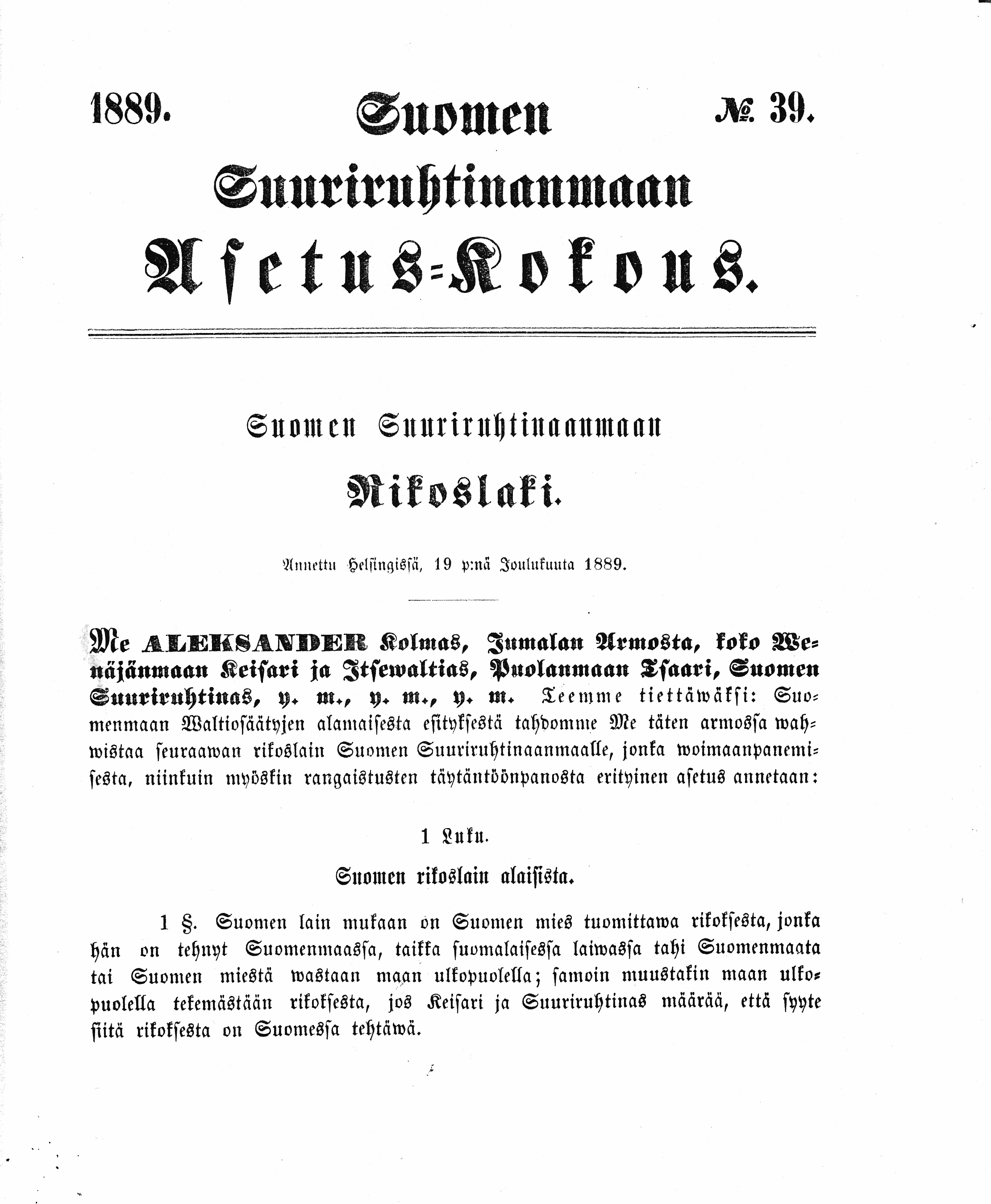
First page of Finland's 1889 Criminal Code

The criminal code of Finland (Finnish: rikoslaki, Swedish: strafflag) is the codification of the central legal source concerning criminal law in Finland.

== History ==
The Criminal Code came into effect in 1894, and it has been modified numerous times since then.

== See also ==
- Law enforcement in Finland
