= List of Brazilian federative units by homicide rate =

This is a list of Brazilian federative units by homicide rate, according to data from the Atlas da Violência (years 1996 to 2021, prepared by the Instituto de Pesquisa Econômica Aplicada (Ipea) and the Fórum Brasileiro de Segurança Pública (FBSP) and the Mapa da Violência from 1998 (1980s to 1988) and 2000 (years 1989 to 1995, prepared by United Nations Educational Organization, Science and Culture (UNESCO).

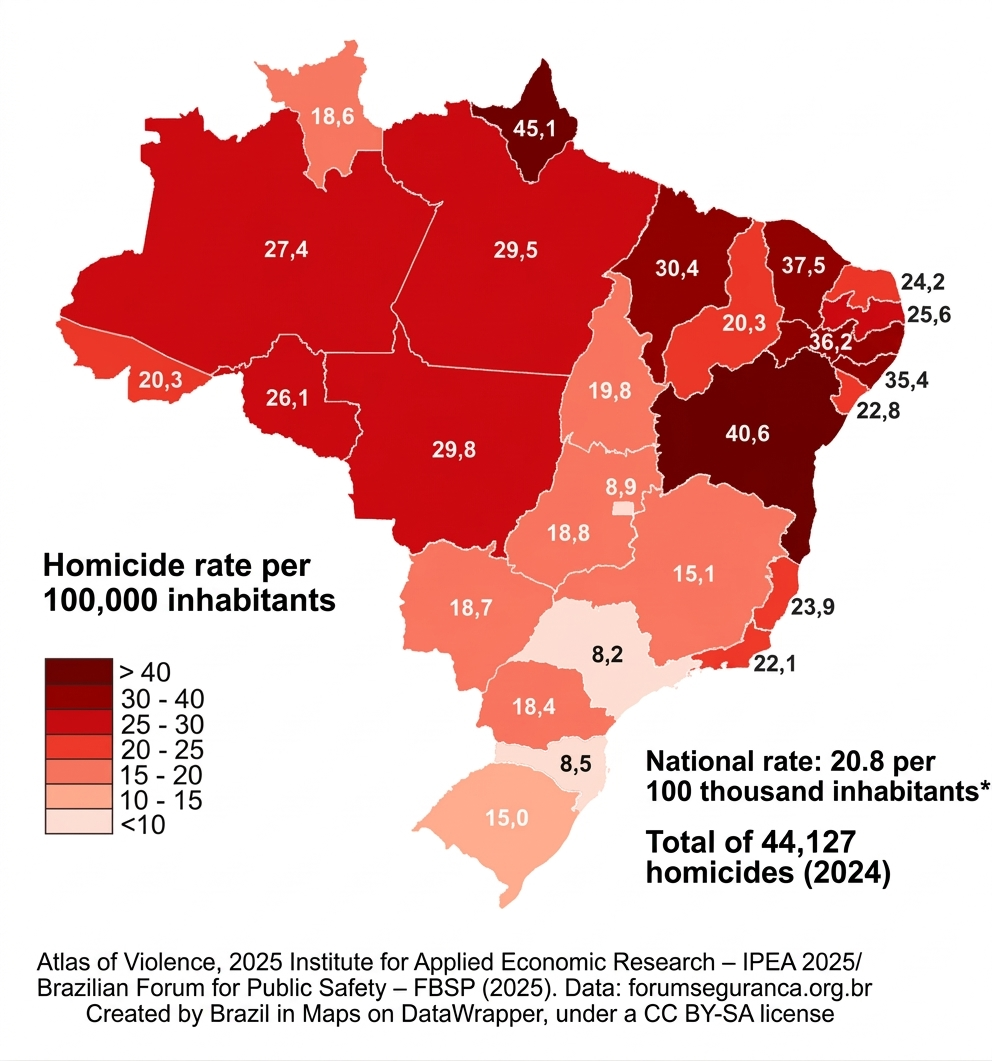
Homicide rate in Brazil

== List ==
=== 2000s and 2020s ===
The list of decades, by default, is ordered by homicide rate in a decreasing manner according to 2021. That is, the federative units with the highest rates this year are closer to the top of the list.

Homicide rate per 100 thousand inhabitants
Federative unit	2000	2001	2002	2003	2004	2005	2006	2007	2008	2009	2010	2011	2012	2013	2014	2015	2016	2017	2018	2019	2020	2021
Rio Grande do Norte	9,57	11,44	10,48	14,02	11,77	13,52	14,95	19,10	22,98	25,50	25,57	32,95	34,82	42,89	47,00	44,88	53,35	62,8	52,5	40,7	38,0	32,4
Acre	19,56	21,07	25,73	24,48	18,56	18,51	23,01	19,48	19,56	22,14	22,49	21,97	27,41	30,14	29,36	27,01	44,45	62,2	47,1	33,6	32,9	21,2
Ceará	17,19	17,01	18,88	20,15	20,12	20,98	21,81	23,19	23,89	25,33	31,80	32,73	44,63	50,95	52,31	46,75	40,63	60,2	54,0	26,2	45,2	37,0
Pernambuco	56,17	58,81	54,37	55,34	50,66	51,46	52,60	53,04	50,90	44,98	39,48	39,15	37,25	33,92	36,19	41,16	47,26	57,2	44,1	36,3	38,3	34,8
Sergipe	23,55	28,50	30,12	25,02	23,86	24,75	29,24	25,67	27,76	32,33	32,69	34,98	41,64	43,95	49,42	58,09	64,66	57,4	49,7	42,1	42,6	33,9
Alagoas	26,55	29,06	34,32	35,61	35,11	39,89	53,10	59,51	60,33	59,35	66,88	71,39	64,63	65,07	62,78	52,33	54,18	53,7	43,4	34,2	37,3	31,8
Pará	13,42	15,23	18,47	21,37	22,69	27,63	29,15	30,27	39,06	40,22	46,44	39,97	41,37	42,72	42,68	44,95	50,85	54,7	53,2	40,5	32,5	32,8
Bahia	9,46	12,27	13,20	16,12	16,69	20,85	23,73	25,98	33,23	37,11	41,69	39,36	43,37	37,85	40,01	39,54	46,94	48,8	45,8	39,2	44,9	44,9
Amapá	34,00	36,49	35,04	34,59	31,10	32,96	32,81	27,02	34,25	30,32	38,83	30,54	36,22	30,61	34,09	38,22	48,70	48,0	51,4	49,1	41,7	53,8
Roraima	47,59	32,02	35,17	29,67	23,12	24,28	27,52	27,93	25,44	28,00	26,86	20,64	30,67	43,85	31,79	40,15	39,67	47,5	71,8	35,0	29,2	35,5
Goiás	21,90	22,81	26,29	25,37	28,21	26,12	26,33	26,04	30,66	32,09	32,96	37,36	45,38	46,24	44,26	45,34	45,34	42,8	38,6	32,6	30,5	26,1
Amazonas	20,90	16,72	17,32	18,41	16,97	18,53	21,11	21,10	24,84	26,99	31,06	36,51	37,43	31,28	32,01	37,38	36,28	41,2	37,8	27,8	26,5	39,1
Rio de Janeiro	52,75	50,57	56,61	54,54	51,43	48,16	47,48	41,62	35,67	33,51	35,44	29,67	29,40	31,22	34,74	30,62	36,38	38,4	37,6	34,6	28,3	27,2
Espírito Santo	48,14	46,02	51,35	50,12	49,08	47,00	50,86	53,33	56,38	56,92	50,98	47,14	46,59	42,25	41,42	36,90	31,96	37,9	29,3	26,2	29,7	28,2
Tocantins	15,15	17,89	14,08	16,58	15,80	14,55	17,19	16,63	18,51	22,37	23,64	25,77	26,73	23,61	25,45	33,20	37,64	35,9	36,7	24,2	28,5	24,3
Paraíba	14,92	13,95	17,37	17,51	19,06	20,72	22,77	23,67	27,49	33,50	38,63	42,57	39,97	39,62	39,33	38,32	33,88	33,3	31,1	23,4	28,9	28,6
Mato Grosso	40,92	38,00	36,40	34,25	31,62	32,36	31,36	30,55	31,68	33,31	32,03	32,80	34,47	36,39	42,12	36,84	35,70	32,9	28,7	26,0	28,1	24,9
Brazil (total)	27,35	27,86	28,53	29,14	26,94	26,13	26,61	26,20	26,72	27,18	27,80	27,45	29,41	28,55	29,82	28,89	30,33	31,6	27,8	22,7	23,6	22,3
Maranhão	6,42	9,82	10,44	13,54	12,32	15,32	15,67	17,99	20,25	21,96	23,10	23,94	26,47	31,84	35,94	35,31	34,63	31,1	28,2	22,1	28,7	28,3
Rondônia	35,37	40,70	42,95	38,88	38,04	36,17	37,44	27,17	32,14	35,77	34,95	28,55	33,08	27,95	33,06	33,93	39,33	30,7	27,1	25,9	23,0	25,0
Rio Grande do Sul	16,55	17,98	18,37	18,15	18,67	18,64	18,09	19,85	21,92	20,54	19,50	19,35	22,12	20,80	24,31	26,17	28,57	29,3	23,8	16,8	17,6	15,9
Paraná	18,85	21,17	23,13	25,79	28,22	29,01	29,82	29,54	32,53	34,61	34,33	32,11	32,98	26,70	26,89	26,30	27,40	24,4	21,5	19,4	21,6	20,8
Mato Grosso do Sul	31,64	29,42	31,95	32,49	29,84	27,87	29,72	30,46	29,92	30,71	26,79	27,16	27,26	24,35	26,72	23,91	25,02	24,3	20,1	19,1	17,5	20,7
Minas Gerais	12,06	13,05	16,32	20,85	22,84	21,95	21,44	20,92	19,59	18,68	18,60	21,60	22,98	22,91	22,78	21,72	22,01	20,4	16,0	13,4	12,6	11,4
Distrito Federal	34,07	33,04	29,87	33,88	31,16	28,16	27,69	29,21	31,75	33,83	30,58	34,56	36,02	30,00	29,55	25,46	25,53	20,1	17,8	15,0	14,2	11,2
Piauí	8,35	9,12	10,63	10,19	11,09	12,24	13,77	12,49	11,57	12,24	13,18	14,01	16,61	18,78	22,45	20,29	21,82	19,4	19,0	17,8	21,5	23,8
Santa Catarina	8,38	8,75	10,58	11,95	11,22	10,79	11,18	10,45	13,25	13,40	13,17	12,84	12,86	11,89	13,45	14,03	14,24	15,2	11,9	11,4	11,2	10,1
São Paulo	42,89	41,92	38,05	36,29	28,89	21,93	20,40	15,45	15,44	15,84	14,64	14,05	15,67	13,82	14,05	12,22	10,88	10,3	8,2	8,9	9,0	7,9

=== 1980s and 1990s ===
Homicide rate per 100 thousand
Federative unit	1980	1981	1982	1983	1984	1985	1986	1987	1988	1989	1990	1991	1992	1993	1994	1995	1996	1997	1998	1999
Acre	17	19	20	21	15	17	24	33	23	23,9	15,7	25,3	24,8	25,9	19,4	22,0	21,51	19,99	21,40	9,66
Alagoas	15	20	21	27	25	23	25	24	31	33,5	29,2	27,0	23,4	24,3	23,9	28,1	28,14	24,11	21,65	20,42
Amapá	4	10	13	12	12	14	13	11	11	14,2	16,6	18,1	24,0	20,12	35,9	35,0	41,37	34,83	38,02	43,66
Amazonas	11	12	12	11	14	12	10	12	15	16,5	18,1	19,2	16,3	15,8	17,0	18,4	18,83	19,02	21,18	20,42
Bahia	6	3	5	4	5	5	5	6	7	9,4	7,5	5,0	6,9	12,4	14,3	12,4	15,01	15,59	9,89	7,03
Ceará	10	10	9	11	11	10	10	11	13	9,8	8,8	9,7	8,5	10,8	9,5	12,6	13,00	14,83	13,49	15,53
Distrito Federal	45	31	20	23	16	21	20	25	23	23,7	31,1	33,5	28,4	35,9	35,4	38,9	33,76	32,66	32,91	33,45
Espírito Santo	29	22	19	19	20	21	28	30	30	34,0	35,3	37,7	32,1	41,3	43,3	42,2	42,49	49,63	57,85	51,87
Goiás	34	43	46	39	40	44	31	32	35	20,6	17,0	20,4	19,3	16,6	17,2	16,7	17,32	16,04	14,84	17,59
Maranhão	7	4	5	8	8	7	8	8	8	8,4	9,1	9,3	8,4	7,8	6,1	7,4	6,95	6,29	5,19	4,84
Mato Grosso	3	6	5	11	13	18	23	23	26	25,5	21,3	22,5	17,4	17,1	15,0	27,5	9,52	33,48	35,68	34,60
Mato Grosso do Sul	42	47	44	44	43	39	39	38	37	21,6	20,3	22,1	23,6	25,1	27,6	33,1	37,45	37,11	33,57	28,18
Minas Gerais	21	20	20	20	21	20	23	23	16	7,8	7,4	7,7	6,9	7,5	6,7	7,2	7,56	7,97	8,84	9,23
Pará	14	14	13	15	15	16	16	15	16	14,5	15,6	16,5	15,1	12,1	13,5	12,9	12,70	13,34	13,42	10,91
Paraíba	12	15	15	16	17	15	16	12	13	14,4	13,7	12,5	10,6	11,2	12,1	13,9	19,24	14,77	13,57	11,94
Paraná	26	27	24	21	19	16	16	16	18	13,3	14,0	14,5	12,8	14,3	14,4	15,7	15,32	17,29	17,55	18,20
Pernambuco	33	30	32	33	35	37	40	43	47	36,4	38,9	38,8	35,2	37,6	34,7	36,1	40,84	49,73	58,79	55,63
Piauí	7	7	10	9	6	6	8	6	9	5,9	4,5	4,4	3,7	4,6	3,9	4,6	4,38	5,27	5,16	4,86
Rio de Janeiro	59	48	52	48	60	64	71	69	82	34,0	55,9	39,6	35,0	41,2	48,9	62,2	59,93	58,68	55,35	52,59
Rio Grande do Norte	10	10	12	13	14	16	15	11	11	10,0	8,6	9,2	8,1	9,9	8,4	9,9	9,42	9,06	8,46	8,44
Rio Grande do Sul	25	24	24	25	25	23	27	26	18	17,5	18,7	18,5	17,0	12,6	14,2	15,0	15,38	16,88	15,45	15,37
Rondônia	38	34	32	43	45	54	64	69	60	49,6	51,9	44,2	35,0	42,6	33,6	27,2	24,49	28,28	38,71	33,31
Roraima	14	18	28	18	15	13	13	4	50	58,3	62,1	36,9	43,6	31,8	33,6	36,9	43,30	35,36	51,40	57,69
Santa Catarina	18	21	20	16	15	18	16	14	14	8,0	8,4	7,8	7,6	7,7	7,1	8,4	8,45	8,53	8,23	7,55
São Paulo	22	25	24	24	30	29	31	33	31	30,2	30,7	27,1	24,4	26,3	30,3	34,6	36,11	36,08	39,64	44,01
Sergipe	7	9	11	18	22	29	29	31	33	9,2	10,1	21,7	30,7	20,4	22,1	16,2	14,65	11,47	10,39	19,21
Tocantins	—	—	—	—	—	—	—	—	—	7,2	5,9	10,2	7,1	9,6	10,8	7,4	12,02	10,36	11,64	12,07
Brazil (total)	23	23	23	22	25	27	27	27	27	20,2	22,2	20,9	19,1	20,3	21,4	24,0	24,78	25,39	25,94	26,20

== See also ==
- Crime in Brazil
- List of cities by murder rate
- Homicide in world cities
- List of countries by firearm-related death rate
- List of Brazilian states
