= List of Belize-related topics =

The location of the nation of Belize

The following is an alphabetical list of topics related to the nation of Belize.

== General ==
- Coat of arms of Belize
- Demographics of Belize
- Flag of Belize
- Foreign relations of Belize
- Great Blue Hole
- ISO 3166-2:BZ
- Sarstoon River
- The Scout Association of Belize

== Buildings and structures ==
=== Archaeological sites ===
==== Maya sites ====
- Actun Tunichil Muknal
- Altun Ha
- Cahal Pech
- Caracol
- Cerros
- High Temple, Lamanai
- Lamanai
- Louisville, Belize
- Lubaantun
- Mask Temple, Lamanai
- Maya ruins of Belize
- Nim Li Punit
- Xunantunich

=== Zoos ===
- Belize Zoo

== Cable television stations ==
- Krem Television
- LOVE Belize Television

== Communications ==
- .bz Internet country code top-level domain for Belize
- Amandala
- Communications in Belize
- Great Belize Productions
- Great Belize Television
- KREM FM
- Krem Television
- List of radio stations in Belize
- LOVE Belize Television
- LOVE FM
- Speed Net
- The Belize Times
- The Guardian (Belize)
- The Reporter (Belize)
- Tropical Vision Limited

=== Media ===
- Amandala
- Centaur Cable Network
- Great Belize Productions
- Great Belize Television
- KREM FM
- Krem Television
- List of radio stations in Belize
- LOVE FM
- The Belize Times
- The Guardian (Belize)
- The Reporter (Belize)
- Tropical Vision Limited

==== Newspapers ====
- Amandala
- The Belize Times
- The Guardian (Belize)
- The Reporter (Belize)

==== Radio stations ====
- FM 2000
- KREM FM
- List of radio stations in Belize
- LOVE FM
- WAVE Radio

==== Television stations ====
- Centaur Cable Network
- Great Belize Television
- Krem Television
- LOVE Belize Television
- Template:Television in Belize
- Tropical Vision Limited

== Culture ==
=== Music ===
- Brukdown
- Garifuna music
- Music of Belize
- Punta

==== Garifuna music ====
- Chumba
- Garifuna music
- Punta rock

===== Punta =====
- Punta rock

==== Musicians ====
- Andy Palacio
- Colville Young
- Francis Reneau
- Gerald Rhaburn
- Leroy Young
- Paul Nabor
- Selwyn Walford Young
- Shyne
- Wilfred Peters
- Yung Fresh

===== Composers =====
- Colville Young
- Errollyn Wallen
- Francis Reneau
- Selwyn Walford Young

=== Sport ===
- Belize at the 2006 Commonwealth Games
- Belize Premier Football League
- Cross Country Cycling Classic
- Football Federation of Belize

==== Football ====
- Belize national football team
- Belize Premier Football League
- Belmopan United
- Boca F.C.
- Football Federation of Belize
- Griga United
- Hankook Verdes
- Juventus (Belize)
- Kulture Yabra FC
- New Site Erei
- San Pedro Seahawks
- Wagiya

===== Footballers =====
- Shane Moody-Orio
- Stanley Reneau

===== Football venues =====
- Carl Ramos Stadium
- Isidoro Beaton Stadium
- MCC Grounds
- Michael Ashcroft Stadium
- Norman Broaster Stadium
- Orange Walk People's Stadium

==== Belize at the Olympics ====
- Belize at the 1996 Summer Olympics
- Belize at the 2000 Summer Olympics
- Belize at the 2004 Summer Olympics

== Economy ==
- Belize dollar
- Economy of Belize

=== Airlines ===
- Maya Airways
- Maya Island Air
- Tropic Air

=== Companies ===
- Maya Island Air
- Tropic Air

==== RSV Media Center ====
- LOVE Belize Television
- LOVE FM

=== Trade unions ===
- Belize National Teachers Union
- Christian Workers' Union
- General Workers' Union (Belize)
- National Trade Union Congress of Belize
- Public Service Union of Belize
- United General Workers Union

== Education ==
- American Global University School of Medicine
- University of Belize

=== Primary schools ===
- Grace Primary School
- Holy Redeemer Primary School
- La Inmaculada Roman Catholic School
- Louisiana Government School
- Queen Square Primary School
- Sarteneja Nazarene Primary School
- St. Joseph Primary School
- St. Luke Methodist School
- St. Martin Deporres School
- St. Mary's Primary School
- St. Peter Claver Primary School
- Trinity Methodist School

=== High schools ===
- Belmopan Comprehensive High School
- Bishop Martin High School
- Canaan High School
- Corozal Community College
- Edward P. Yorke High School
- Gwen Liz High School
- Mopan Technical High School
- Muffles College High school
- New Hope High School
- Our Lady of Guadalupe High School
- Our Lady of Mount Carmel High School
- Palotti High School
- Sacred Heart College (Belize)
- San Pedro High School
- Sarteneja Baptist High school
- St. Catherine's Academy
- St. John's College
- St. Michael's High School
- Technical High school
- Wesley College, Belize

=== Universities and colleges ===
- Belize Adventist Junior College
- Centro Escolar Mexico Junior College
- Corozal Junior College
- Galen University
- Independence Junior College
- Lynam Agricultural College 1953–1971
- Muffles Junior College
- Sacred Heart Junior College
- San Pedro Junior College
- St. John's College Junior College
- Stann Creek Ecumenical Junior College
- University of Belize
- University of the West Indies
- Wesley Junior College

=== University ===
- Galen University
- University of Belize
- University of the West Indies

== Ethnic groups ==
- Asians
- Belizean Kriol people
- East Indian
- Garifuna people
- German Mennonites
- Lebanese
- Maya peoples
- Mestizo

== Fauna ==
Category:Fauna of Belize

- Agkistrodon bilineatus
- Great curassow
- Jaguar
- Jaguarundi
- Ocelot
- Plain chachalaca

== Flora ==
Category:Flora of Belize

== Geography ==
- Adjacent countries:
- Geography of Belize

Guatemala
Mexico

- Armenia, Belize
- Belize Barrier Reef
- Big Creek, Belize
- Blue Hole (park)
- Elridgeville
- Gales Point
- Guanacaste National Park (Belize)
- Gulf of Honduras
- Independence and Mango Creek
- Peini
- Placencia
- Port Loyola
- Ports of Belize
- Roaring Creek
- San Carlos, Belize
- San Joaquin, Corozal
- San José, Orange Walk District
- San Pedro Columbia
- Shipyard, Belize
- Silver Creek, Belize
- Spanish Lookout
- St. Margret's, Belize
- Valley of Peace, Belize

=== Bays ===
- Chetumal Bay
- Corozal Bay
- Sarteneja Bay

=== Caves ===
- Actun Box Ch'iich'
- Actun Tunichil Muknal

=== Cities and towns ===
- Belize City
- Belmopan
- Benque Viejo del Carmen
- Bullet Tree Falls
- Burrell Boom
- Carmelita, Belize
- Chunox
- Consejo
- Corozal Town
- Dangriga
- Guinea Grass Town
- Hattieville
- Hopkins, Belize
- Ladyville
- Las Cuevas
- Little Belize
- Monkey River Town
- Orange Walk Town
- Patchacan
- Progresso, Belize
- Punta Gorda, Belize
- San Antonio, Cayo
- San Antonio, Toledo
- San Estevan, Belize
- San Ignacio Cayo
- San Pablo, Orange Walk
- San Pedro Town
- Sarteneja
- Toledo Settlement
- Trial Farm, Belize
- Xaibe

=== Districts ===
- Belize District
- Cayo District
- Corozal District
- Districts of Belize
- Islands District
- Orange Walk District
- Stann Creek District
- Toledo District

=== Islands ===
- Ambergris Caye
- Caye Caulker
- Islands of Belize
- St. George's Caye

=== Mountains ===
- Doyle's Delight
- Maya Mountains
- Victoria Peak (Belize)

=== Parks ===
- Belize Botanic Gardens
- Chiquibul National Park
- Cockscomb Wildlife Sanctuary
- Guanacaste National Park
- Hol Chan Marine Reserve

=== Rivers ===
- Belize River
- Hondo River (Belize)
- Macal River
- Mopan River
- Mullins River

=== Geography stubs ===
- Actun Tunichil Muknal
- Armenia, Belize
- Banco Chinchorro
- Belize Botanic Gardens
- Belize City
- Belize District
- Belize River
- Belize Zoo
- Benque Viejo del Carmen
- Big Creek, Belize
- Blue Hole (park)
- Cahal Pech
- Caracol
- Caribbean Lowlands
- Carmelita, Belize
- Cayo District
- Chetumal Bay
- Chunox
- Consejo
- Corozal District
- Corozal Town
- Dangriga
- Districts of Belize
- Doyle's Delight
- Elridgeville
- Gales Point
- Great Blue Hole
- Guanacaste National Park (Belize)
- Guinea Grass Town
- Gulf of Honduras
- Hattieville
- Hondo River (Belize)
- Hopkins, Belize
- Hummingbird Highway
- Independence and Mango Creek
- Islands of Belize
- Ladyville
- Little Belize
- Louisville, Belize
- Macal River
- Maya Mountains
- Monkey River Town
- Mopan River
- Mullins River
- Nim Li Punit
- Orange Walk District
- Orange Walk Town
- Patchacan
- Peini
- Placencia
- Port Loyola
- Ports of Belize
- Progresso, Belize
- Punta Gorda, Belize
- Roaring Creek
- San Estevan, Belize
- San Ignacio Cayo
- San Joaquin, Corozal
- San José, Orange Walk District
- San Pablo, Orange Walk
- San Pedro Town
- Sarteneja
- Shipyard, Belize
- Silver Creek, Belize
- Spanish Lookout
- St. George's Caye
- St. Margret's, Belize
- Stann Creek District
- Template:Belize-geo-stub
- Toledo District
- Toledo Settlement
- Trial Farm, Belize
- Valley of Peace, Belize
- Xaibe
- Xunantunich

== Government ==
- Senate of Belize

=== Official residences ===
- Government House, Belize

== History ==
- 2005 Belize unrest
- Battlefield Park
- British Honduras
- Captaincy General of Guatemala
- Cross Country Cycling Classic
- Dausuva
- Guatemalan claim to Belizean territory
- History of Belize

=== Elections ===
- Belize legislative election, 1974
- Belize legislative election, 1979
- Belize legislative election, 1984
- Belize legislative election, 1989
- Belize legislative election, 1993
- Belize legislative election, 1998
- Belize legislative election, 2003
- Belize municipal election, 2006
- British Honduras legislative election, 1954
- British Honduras legislative election, 1957
- British Honduras legislative election, 1961
- British Honduras legislative election, 1969
- Elections and Boundaries Commission
- Elections and Boundaries Department
- Elections in Belize

==== Municipal elections ====
- Belize municipal election, 2006

=== Hurricanes ===
- 1934 Central America Hurricane
- Hurricane Edith
- Hurricane Francelia
- Hurricane Greta-Olivia
- Hurricane Hattie
- Hurricane Iris
- Hurricane Janet
- Hurricane Keith

== Languages ==
- Belizean Kriol language
- Garifuna language
- Guatemala-Belize Language Exchange Project
- Languages of Belize
- Mopan language
- Q'eqchi
- Spanish language

== People ==
- Abdulai Conteh
- Alice Gibson
- Antonio Soberanis Gómez
- Baron Bliss
- Category:Belizean people
- Category:Roman Catholic bishops in Belize
- Chito Martínez
- Elijio Panti
- Evan X Hyde
- John Avery (journalist)
- Marion Jones
- Marion M. Ganey
- Michael Ashcroft
- Samuel Alfred Haynes
- Thomas Gann

=== People by occupation ===
==== Sportspeople ====
===== Athletes =====
- Emma Wade

===== Basketball players =====
- Milt Palacio

==== Musicians ====
- Moses Michael Levi Barrow (born Jamal Michael Barrow; 1978), better known by his stage name Shyne, rapper and politician

==== Writers ====
- Colville Young
- Evan X Hyde

===== Novelists =====
- Colville Young
- Zee Edgell

===== Short story writers =====
- Colville Young

==== Nurses ====
- Cleopatra White

== Politics ==
- Commonwealth realm
- Elections and Boundaries Commission
- Elections and Boundaries Department
- House of Representatives of Belize
- Leader of the Opposition, Belize
- List of political parties in Belize
- Politics of Belize
- Senate of Belize

=== Politicians ===
- Adolfo Lizarraga
- Dean Barrow
- Godfrey Smith (politician)
- Gwendolyn Lizarraga
- Jane Ellen Usher
- Lisa Shoman
- Moses Michael Levi Barrow (born Jamal Michael Barrow; 1978), better known by his stage name Shyne
- Said Musa

==== People's United Party politicians ====
- Dolores Balderamos-Garcia
- Godfrey Smith (politician)
- John Briceño
- Jorge Espat
- Jose Coye
- Marcial Mes
- Maxwell Samuels
- Ralph Fonseca
- Valdemar Castillo

==== Prime ministers ====
- George Cadle Price
- List of prime ministers of Belize
- Manuel Esquivel
- Said Musa

=== Political parties ===
- Democratic and Agricultural Labour Party (DALP)
- Honduran Independence Party (HIP)
- List of political parties in Belize
- National Alliance for Belizean Rights (NABR)
- National Independence Party (Belize) (NIP)
- National Party (Belize) (NP)
- National Reform Party (NRP)
- People's United Party
- United Black Association for Development (UBAD)
- United Democratic Party (Belize)
- Vision Inspired by the People (VIP)
- We the People Reform Movement (WTP)

== Religion ==
=== Churches (communities and buildings) ===
H

- Holy Redeemer Cathedral
- Holy Redeemer Catholic Parish, Belize City

P

- Port Loyola Calvary Chapel
- Presbyterian Church of Belize

S

- Sacred Heart Church, Dangriga
- St. Andrew's Anglican Church (San Ignacio)
- St. Andrew's Church (Belize City)
- St. Ann's Anglican Church
- St. John's Cathedral (Belize City)
- St. Peter Claver, Punta Gorda

U

- Unity Presbyterian Church

=== History ===
- Anglican Diocese of Belize
- Belize Evangelical Mennonite Church
- History of Roman Catholicism in Belize
- Mennonites in Belize

=== Personages ===
- Roman Catholic
  - Bishop Salvatore di Pietro
  - Bishop Frederick C. Hopkins
  - Bishop Joseph Anthony Murphy
  - Bishop William A. Rice
  - Bishop David Francis Hickey
  - Bishop Robert Louis Hodapp
  - Bishop Osmond P. Martin
  - Bishop Dorick M. Wright
  - Bishop Christopher Glancy
  - Marion M. Ganey, SJ
  - Caritas Gloria Lawrence, RSM
  - William “Buck” Stanton, SJ

== Transport ==
- Hummingbird Highway
- Rail transport in Belize
- Southern Highway
- Transport in Belize

=== Airports ===
- List of airports in Belize
- Philip S. W. Goldson International Airport

=== Roads ===
- George Price Highway
- Hummingbird Highway
- Northern Highway, Belize
- Southern Highway

== Stub articles ==
- .bz
- Abdulai Conteh
- Andy Palacio
- Antonio Soberanis Gómez
- Baron Bliss
- Battlefield Park
- Belize at the 1996 Summer Olympics
- Belize at the 2000 Summer Olympics
- Belize at the 2006 Commonwealth Games
- Belize dollar
- Belize Premier Football League
- Belizean Kriol people
- Belmopan United
- British Honduras
- Brukdown
- Carl Ramos Stadium
- Centaur Cable Network
- Chito Martínez
- Christian Workers' Union
- Chumba
- Coat of arms of Belize
- Communications in Belize
- Dausuva
- Elijio Panti
- Elmira Minita Gordon
- Emma Wade
- Evan X Hyde
- Flag of Belize
- FM 2000
- Football Federation of Belize
- Francis Reneau
- General Workers' Union (Belize)
- Gerald Rhaburn
- Godfrey Smith (politician)
- Griga United
- Hankook Verdes
- High Temple, Lamanai
- Holy Redeemer Primary School
- Isidro Belton Stadium
- Islam in Belize
- John Avery (journalist)
- Juventus (Belize)
- Kulture Yabra FC
- Languages of Belize
- Las Cuevas
- Leroy Young
- List of endemic species of Belize
- Manuel Esquivel
- Marion Jones Sports Complex
- Maya ruins of Belize
- Michael Ashcroft Stadium
- Military of Belize
- Milt Palacio
- Misuse of Drugs Act (Belize)
- National Alliance for Belizean Rights (NABR)
- National Assembly of Belize
- National Independence Party (Belize)
- National Trade Union Congress of Belize
- New Site Erei
- Norman Broaster Stadium
- Orange Walk People's Stadium
- Paul Nabor
- Philip S. Wright
- Q'eqchi
- Rail transport in Belize
- Roman Catholicism in Belize
- Said Musa
- Samuel Alfred Haynes
- San Pedro Seahawks
- Sarstoon River
- Selwyn Walford Young
- Senate of Belize
- Shane Moody-Orio
- Southern Highway
- Stanley Reneau
- Template:Belize-stub
- The Reporter (Belize)
- Tropic Air
- Tropical Vision Limited
- United General Workers Union
- Wagiya
- Walter Lewis
- WAVE Radio
- Western Highway, Belize
- Wilfred Peters
- Zee Edgell

== See also ==
- Commonwealth of Nations
- List of Belize-related topics
- List of Central America-related topics
- List of international rankings
- Lists of country-related topics
- Outline of geography
- Outline of North America
- United Nations
