= List of universities in Belize =

This is a list of universities and colleges in Belize.

- Belize Adventist Junior College
- Saint Johns College-University
- Belize Institute of Management
- Centro Escolar Mexico Junior College
- Corozal Junior College
- Galen University – programs at the undergraduate, graduate, and professional level in business, arts and sciences, and education
- John Paul II Junior College
- Independence Junior College
- Muffles Junior College
- Sacred Heart Junior College
- St. John's College, Belize – programs at the junior college level in business, arts, social, sciences, and education
- San Pedro Junior College
- Stann Creek Ecumenical Junior College
- University of Belize – programs at the undergraduate, graduate, and professional level in business, arts and sciences, and education
- University of the West Indies – Open Campus's activities in Belize, including public service, outreach activities, research and continuing education programming
- Wesley Junior College – programs at the junior college level in business and science
- Belize Adventist College
- Corozal Community College
