= List of companies of Belize =

Location of Belize

Belize is a country on the eastern coast of Central America bordered on the north by Mexico, on the south and west by Guatemala, and on the east by the Caribbean Sea. Belize has a small, mostly private enterprise economy that is based primarily on export of petroleum and crude oil, agriculture, agro-based industry, and merchandising, with tourism and construction recently assuming greater importance. As of 2007, oil production was 3,000 bbl/d (480 m^{3}/d) and as of 2006 oil exports were 1,960 bbl/d (312 m^{3}/d). The country is also a producer of industrial minerals. In agriculture, sugar, like in colonial times, remains the chief crop, accounting for nearly half of exports, while the banana industry is the largest employer.

== Notable firms ==
This list includes notable companies with primary headquarters located in the country. The industry and sector follow the Industry Classification Benchmark taxonomy. Organizations which have ceased operations are included and noted as defunct.

Notable companies Status: P=Private, S=State; A=Active, D=Defunct
Name	Industry	Sector	Headquarters	Founded	Notes	Status	
Amandala	Consumer services	Publishing	Belize City	1969	Newspaper	P	A
Belize Bank	Financials	Banks	Belize City	1902	Bank	P	A
Belize Electricity Limited	Utilities	Conventional electricity	Belize City	1952	Electrical distributor	P	A
Belize Telemedia Limited	Telecommunications	Mobile telecommunications	Belize City	1972	Telephone, cell	P	A
Central Bank of Belize	Financials	Banks	Belize City	1982	Central bank	S	A
Great Belize Productions	Consumer services	Broadcasting & entertainment	Belize City	1982	Production company	P	A
Great Belize Television	Consumer services	Broadcasting & entertainment	Belize City	1991	Television network, part of Great Belize Productions	P	A
Krem Radio	Consumer services	Broadcasting & entertainment	Belize City	1989	Radio	P	A
Krem Television	Consumer services	Broadcasting & entertainment	Belize City	2004	Television	P	A
Love Belize Television	Consumer services	Broadcasting & entertainment	Belize City	1990	Television	P	A
LOVE FM	Consumer services	Broadcasting & entertainment	Belize City	1993	Radio	P	A
Maya Island Air	Consumer services	Airlines	Belize City	1962	Airline	P	A
National Transportation Services Limited	Consumer services	Travel & tourism	Belize City	2006	Public transportation	S	A
Speed Net	Telecommunications	Mobile telecommunications	Belize City	2003	Cell, landline	P	A
Tropic Air	Consumer services	Airlines	San Pedro Town	1979	Airline	P	A

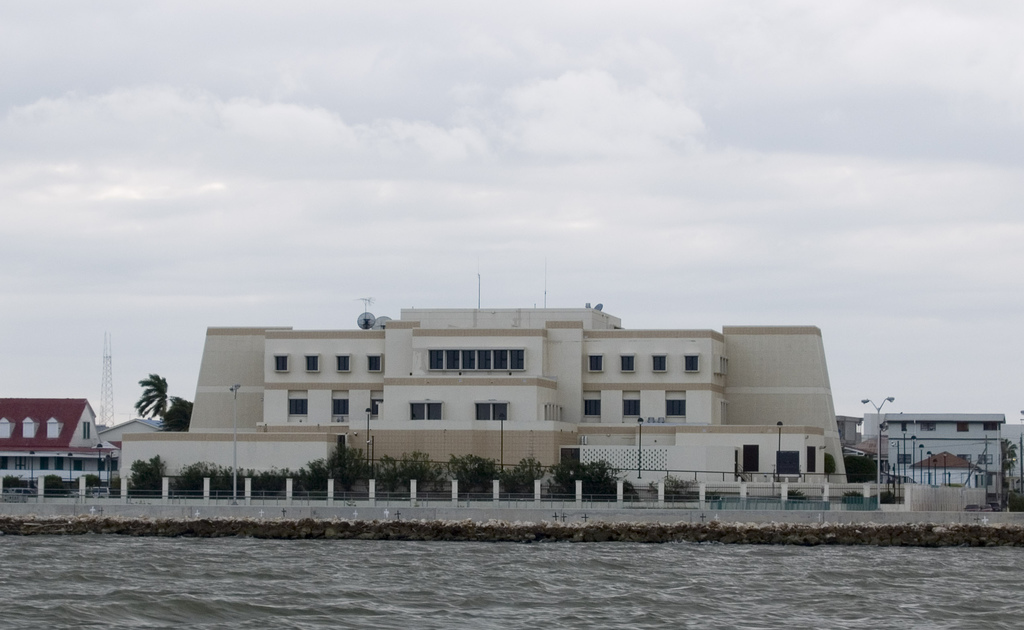
Central Bank of Belize building in Belize City

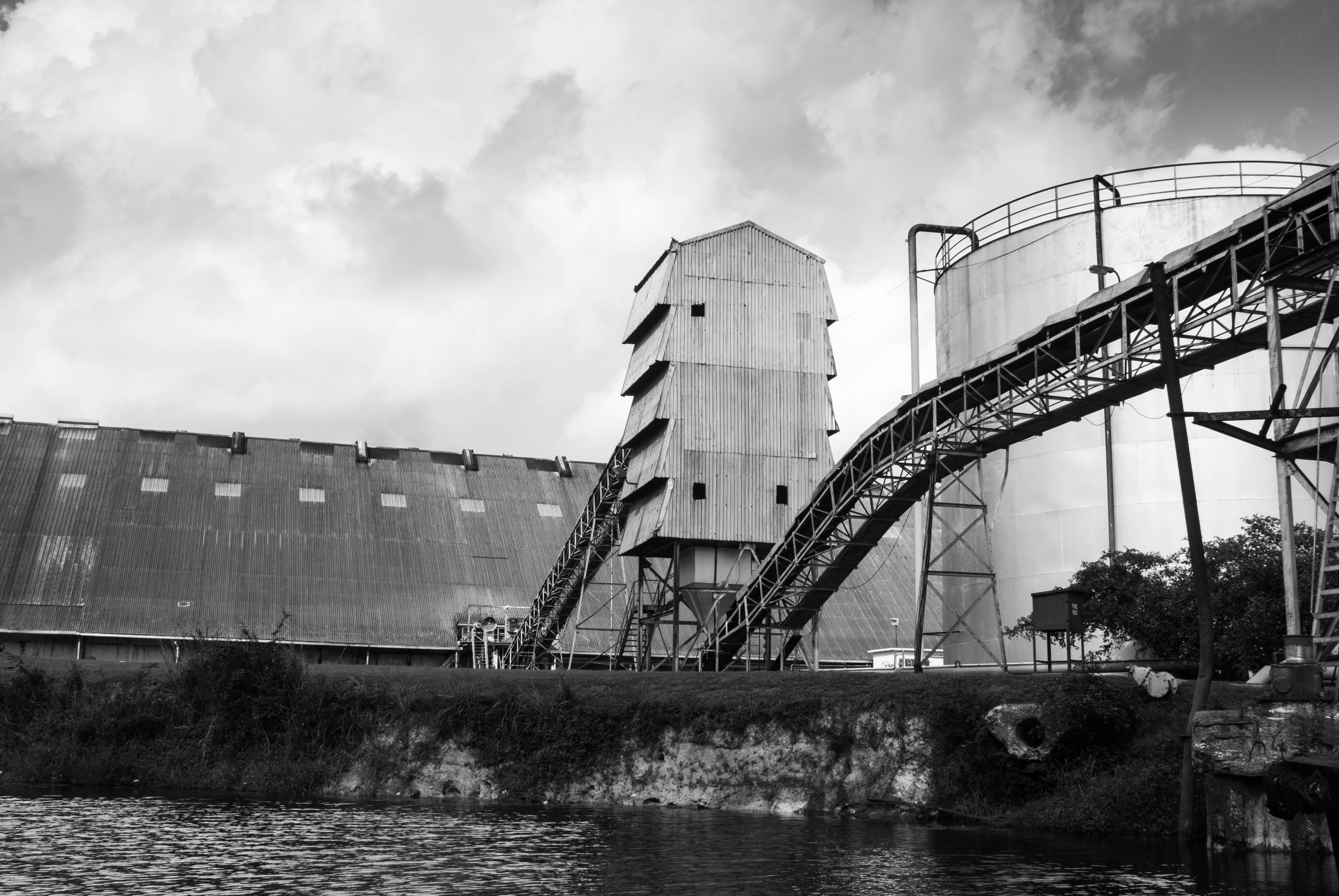
A sugar cane processing plant in Orange Walk Town

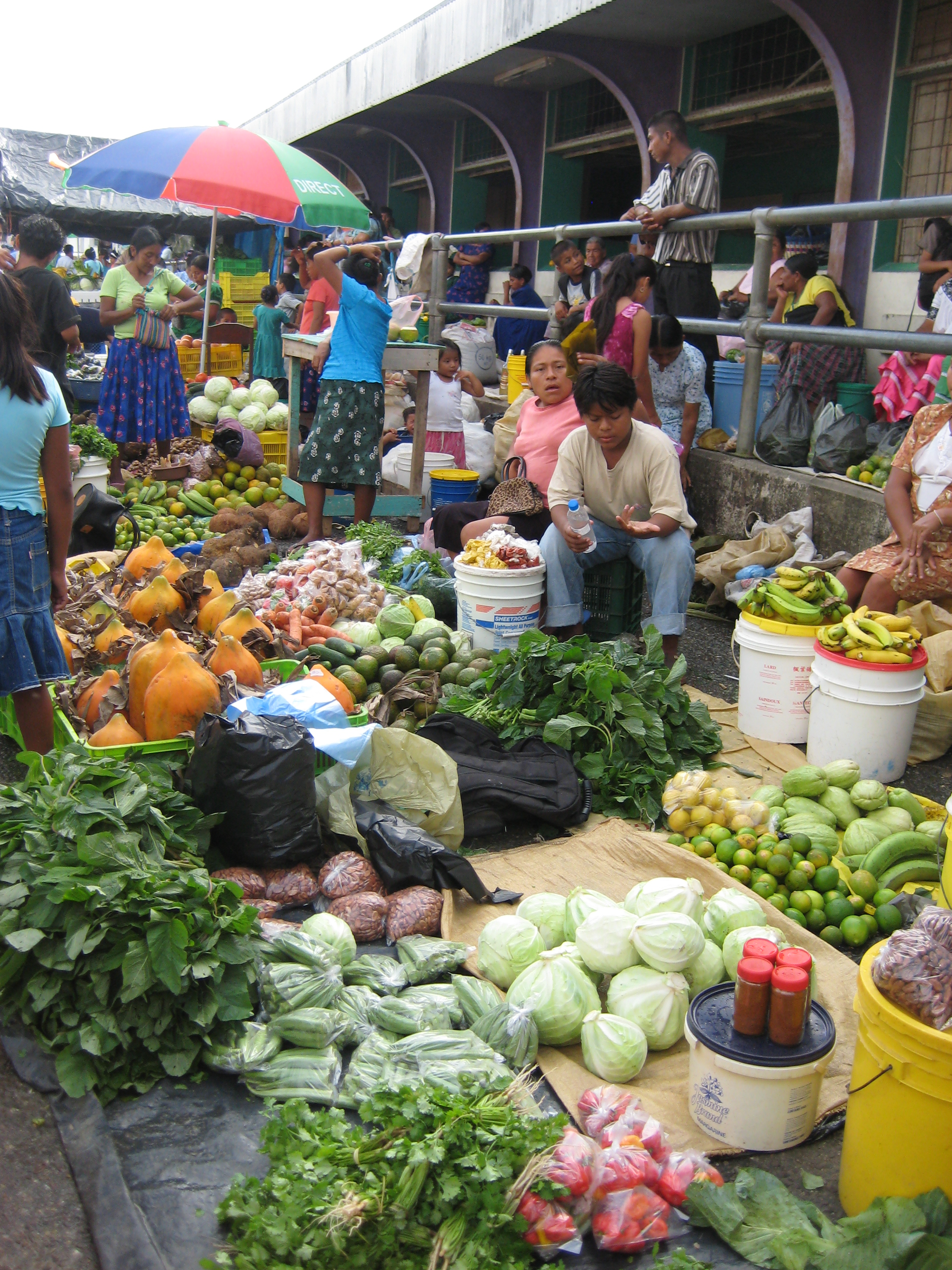
Belize marketplace

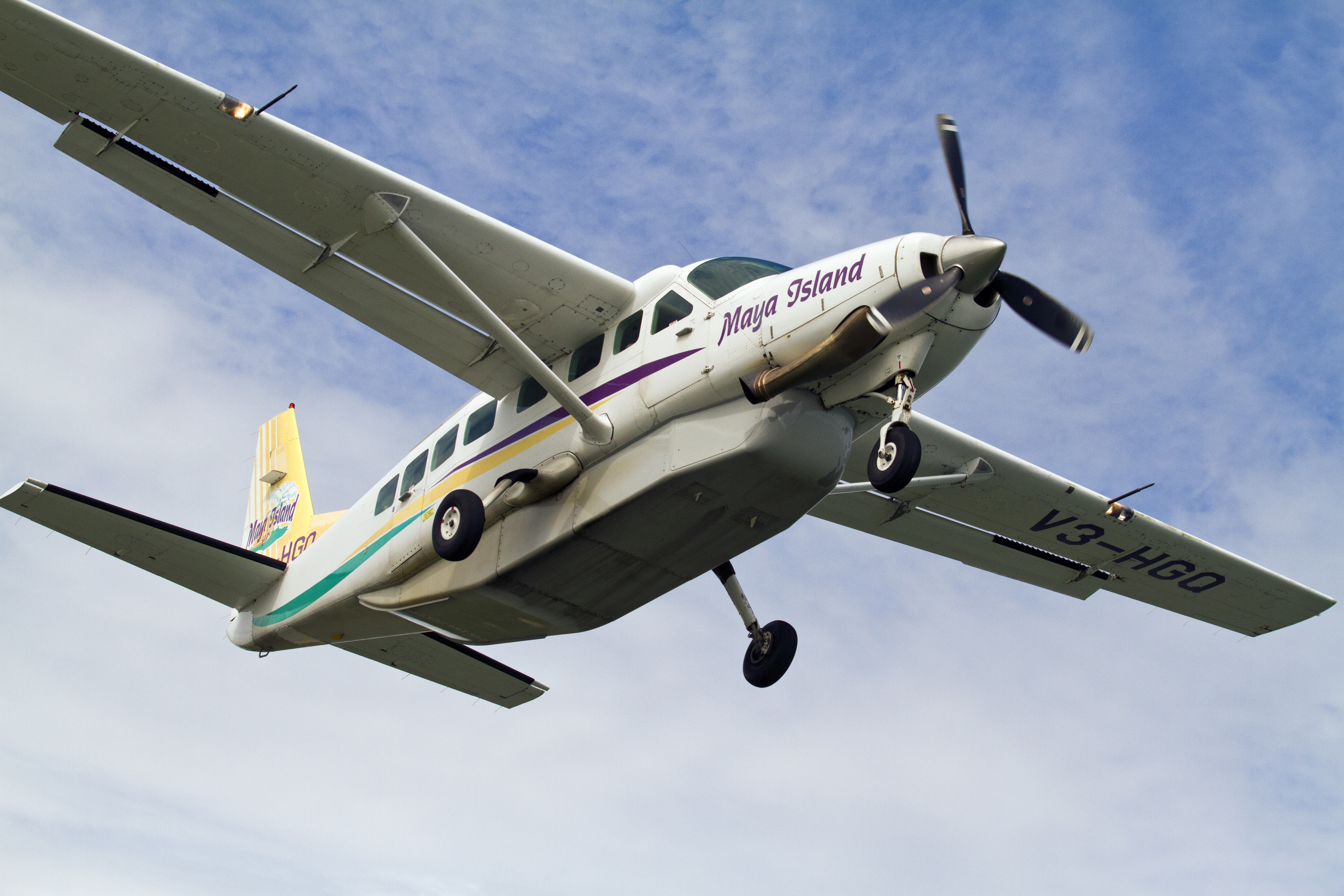
A Cessna 208 of Maya Island Air at Dangriga Airport
