= Reneau =

Surname

Reneau is a surname. Notable people with the surname include:

- Brenda Reneau (1954–2013), American politician
- Dan Reneau (born 1940), former president of Louisiana Tech University
- Enrique Reneau (1971–2015), Honduran football player
- Francis Reneau (or Frankie Reneau), pianist and composer from Belize
- Malik Reneau (born 2003), American basketball player
- Marion Reneau (born 1977), American professional mixed martial artist
- Michele Reneau, American politician
- Paul Réneau (born 1960), Belizean former athlete
- Reneau Z. Peurifoy (born 1949), non-fiction author
- Stanley Reneau, Belizean professional football goalkeeper
- Wernell Reneau (born 1965), Belizean former cyclist

== See also ==
- Reneau P. Almon (1937–2012), justice of the Supreme Court of Alabama
- Aroneanu
- Rammenau
- Rennau
- Rheinau (disambiguation)
