= List of radio stations in Belize =

The following is a list of Belizean radio stations currently in operation.

== National (operating in all districts) ==
- Positive Vibes FM (90.5, 102.9 FM)
- LOVE FM (95.1, 88.9, 98.1, 98.5 FM)
- KREM FM (96.5, 91.1, 101.1 FM)
- WAVE Radio (105.9, 99.9 FM)

== Belize District ==
- BFBS Radio 1/2 Belize (Ladyville) (96.3 FM)
  - Local branch of the British Forces Broadcasting Service. Available along much of the Northern Highway and on the Northside of Belize City, signals weak elsewhere.
- Integrity Radio (97.1 FM)
  - Christian radio station established in the 2000s and operating from Vernon Street.
- Estereo Amor (95.9, 103.7 FM); MORE FM (94.7, 99.5, 107.1 FM)
- Mood FM (Lords Bank Road) (106.3 FM)
  - Oldies and classic radio.
- Reef Radio/Radio Arrecife (San Pedro) (92.3 FM)
  - Popular radio station on Ambergris Caye.

== Corozal/Orange Walk District ==
- Power Mix Corozal (90.7 FM) International Radio
- Sugar City Radio Station (Orange Walk) (103.1 FM) SCRS.bz
  - Home station of the UDP in Orange Walk.
- Romantica FM (Paraiso Village, Corozal) (102.5 FM)
  - Royal FM 92.9 (Corozal)
- Radio Bahia (Corozal) (99.7 FM In Corozal)
- Rainbow FM (Corozal) (107.7 FM)
  - KREM Radio Corozal affiliate.
- Fiesta FM (Orange Walk) (106.7 FM)
  - See Centaur Cable Network. Home station of the PUP in Orange Walk.
- Universal Radio 88.5 FM
  - East Radio 104.9 FM (Orange Walk Town)

Mood 106.3 fm, Alta Mira Corozal.

== Cayo/Stann Creek/Toledo Districts ==
- Millenium Radio (Benque Viejo Del Carmen) (106.5)
- Radio Vision (San Ignacio Town) formerly Radio Ritmo (91.9 FM)
- Ko'ox Ti Ok'ot- Toh Xahok Maya Cultural Show (online)
- Power Mix (Dangriga) (90.7 FM)
- My Refuge Christian (Belmopan and Roaring Creek 93.7 FM)
- Wamalali Radio (Punta Gorda) (106.3 FM)
- Toledo Christian Radio (Dump, Toledo) (99.9 FM)
- FM Maya (Toledo)
- Maximum Radio (Santa Elena, San Ignacio, Cayo District 104.1)

== Defunct ==
- FM 2000 (90.5; 102.9 FM)
- Radio Belize (88.9, 91.1 FM)
