= Valley of Peace =

Valley of Peace may refer to:

- Valley of Peace, Belize, a village in Cayo District, Belize
- Valley of Peace (film), a 1956 Yugoslavian war film
- Valley of Peace initiative, an effort to promote economic cooperation between Israel, Jordan, and Palestine
- Wadi-us-Salaam, an Islamic cemetery located in Najaf, Iraq
