= List of Caribbean chordophones =

This is a list of chordophones used in the Caribbean music area, including the islands of the Caribbean Sea, as well as the musics of Guyana, Suriname, French Guiana, Belize, Garifuna music, and Bermuda.

== List ==
Instrument	Tradition	Hornbostel–Sachs classification	Description
calorine	See tambou maringouin	-	
banjo	Belize	321.312	Guitar, used in Brukdown
bass guitar	Jamaica	321.322	Guitar, used in popular styles like ska, reggae and rocksteady
bass guitar, electric	Trinidad and Tobago	321.322	Electric bass guitar, used in soca
bass guitar, electric	Garifuna music	321.312	Electric bass guitar, used in punta
bass guitar, electric	Belize	321.312	Electric bass guitar, used in Brukdown
bass, upright	Cuba	321.322	Used in popular son ensembles, where it replaced the more traditional marimbula and botija
cuatro	Dominican Republic	321.322	Stringed instrument, part of some popular merengue groups' instrumentation
cuatro	Puerto Rico	321.322	Five-stringed instrument
guitar	Cuba	321.322	Guitar, used for the Zapateo dance and other rural music
guitar	Dominican Republic	321.322	Guitar, part of some popular merengue groups' instrumentation
guitar	Haiti	321.322	Guitar, used in méringue
guitar	Jamaica	321.322	Guitar, used in popular styles like ska, reggae and rocksteady
guitar	Martinique and Guadeloupe	321.322	Guitar, used in zouk
guitar	Trinidad and Tobago	321.322	Guitar, used in traditional calypso, introduced from Venezuela
guitar, electric	Trinidad and Tobago	321.322	Electric guitar, used in soca
guitar, electric	Garifuna music	321.312	Electric guitar, used in punta
laúd	Cuba	321.321	Seven double-stringed mandolin, used in son and other fields
maringouin, tambou calorine	Haiti	3	Earth bow, made from a covered hole in the ground, across which a bow is laid
piano	Cuba	3	Used in popular genres like son
piano	Dominican Republic	3	Part of some merengue bands
seis	Cuba	321.322	Six double-stringed guitar
sitar	Trinidad and Tobago	3	Indo-Caribbean stringed instrument
tres	Cuba	321.322	Three double-stringed guitar, used in son and other rural folk genres
violin	Dominican Republic	321.322	Stringed instrument

== See also ==
- List of string instruments
