= Toledo, Belize =

Toledo, Belize, may refer to:

- Toledo District
- Toledo Settlement, a town in Toledo District
