= Guanacaste National Park =

Guanacaste National Park may refer to:

- Guanacaste National Park (Belize)
- Guanacaste National Park (Costa Rica)
