= Guinea Grass =

- Guinea Grass
- Flag

- Location within Belize
- Coordinates: 17°58′5″N 88°35′44″W
- Country: Belize
- District: Orange Walk District
- Guinea Grass Village: 1860's

Government
  - Chair Man/Chair Lady: Sir Benito Uck

Area
  - Total: 3.38 km^{2} (1.31 sq mi)
- Elevation: 39 m (128 ft)

Population (2010 Census)
  - Total: 3,563
- Time zone: UTC-6 (Central)
- Climate: Am

Guinea Grass is a village in the Orange Walk District of the nation of Belize. It is 38 metres (127 feet) above sea level. According to the 2000 census, Guinea Grass had a population of 2,510 people, and by 2010 the figures showed a population of 3,500. The population is made up of mostly Mestizos, Creoles, and East Indians. There are a number of Mennonites, Taiwanese, and Central American immigrants living near or immediately in the village.

== Origin of name ==
There are two stories that explain the origin of the village's name. The first is that, after the emancipation of slavery in the British Caribbean, indentured labourers from India, known as "East Indians", settled in the area and began to plant and cultivate bananas for a British estate. The locals knew the bananas as "Guineo", from there it morphed into "Guineal", and the then settlement became known as "Guinea Grass". The other version is that there was an English agent for the Belize Estate Company known as "Chichiri" Price, relative to the Rt. Hon. George Price who lived on a farm on the northern outskirts of the village and raised livestock. In order to feed the livestock, he had grass imported from England and Mexico. The grass that he imported was Guinea grass (Megathyrsus maximus). The locals then began to call the community Guinea Grass after the imported grass scattered and spread beyond the farm and into the community. The grass can still be seen on the outskirts of the village's main road towards the Philip Goldson Highway.

== History ==
The area presently known as the village of Guinea Grass, the Tower Hill area, and the San Juan Corridor were inhabited by the Maya in a number of linked Mayan settlements known as "Posito", or wells, because of the vast number of wells built by the Mayas in the area, especially along the San Juan Corridor and the bank of the New River by the Guinea Grass main road. Some wells can still be seen today and are used by farmers to water crops. Villagers of Guinea Grass have also spotted a tunnel, made by the Mayas, that runs from near the Catholic church to a hilltop going to Ship Yard village where the Pech family resides. As in most cases, after the Europeans came to the Americas the population of the indigenous people declined and many settlements were abandoned which is what happened in Posito.

Based on oral history passed down from older generations, the village started when a few runaway slaves from Crooked Tree and Belize River Valley and many light-skinned (red-skinned) children of slave owners or Englishmen ran away and settled by a stem of the New River (not the main river, which is presently Guinea Grass Village) so as to not be found, as marriage with a dark-skinned person was not allowed. They settled in the community with the remaining Maya of the area returning to the location. Later, the Waiika and Mosquito people from the British-owned Nicaraguan coast arrived, and a few families settled in the village, along with a British farmer from the Belize Estate to cultivate the land.

In the 1800s, after slavery was abolished in the British West Indies, the British recruited indentured servants from China and India to work in agriculture in British Honduras. A British man opened a banana plantation and brought Indian labourers to cultivate and work on the plantation at Guinea Grass. After a short period of time, in 1847, came the mestizos (mixture of Spanish and Maya), the Yucatec Maya, and the Yucatecos (Spaniards born in Yucatán Mexico to Spanish parents or grandparents) to the north of Belize, to escape La Guerra de Castas (the Caste War) of Yucatán, Mexico. The settlement then included multiple ethnicities, and speakers of different languages had to find ways to communicate. They settled on English creole as a means to communicate with each other.

The Mestizo population soon grew to outnumber other cultures through intermarriages and with a high fertility rate. Although presently the number of households is lower in the village, the Mestizo population is still the largest ethnic group followed by those identifying as mixed race. The community had no official administration, so it took justice into its own hands. Many white Spanish "Yucatecos" were feared because of this, and many altercations arose due to cultural and economic differences.

=== Colonial days, WWI and WWII ===
In the mid-1880s, the settlement was officially recognized by the colonial Governor of British Honduras as Guinea Grass. A representative of the crown, Mr. Price, of the Belize estate, and the Ayuso and Disus families were relocated to the village along with a militia and Edward Alamilla from Corozal. A primary school, with a teacher Mr. Martinez, along with a Catholic church, and a Carib/Garifuna from Silk Grass were established. The villagers did subsistence farming in order to have food as they were only paid BZD $10–12 per month as chicleros (gum extractors) and log-wood cutters and had to camp in the Yalbac Hills for months. The job and ways to have an income were based on a complex scheme, since in order to live on and farm the lands, they had to pay taxes to the crown. To afford and maintain the household and be able to pay taxes, they had to get a job. It was a complex scheme used by the colony's government in British Honduras to keep subjects in debt with leased land. Desiderio Perez described his time working on the forest: while at camp, they received weekly rations from the colonel, seven quarts of flour and four pounds of pork meat.

The river served as the main route for exporting and importing from and to the village. The colonial area of the village was only three blocks from the riverbank. Going through the lush forest, especially at night, was dangerous, as wild animals such as jaguars, pumas, and snakes roamed freely. On the northern side of the village was a banana plantation owned by an American, Mr. Mason. On the southern end of the village lived the East Indians and the Waiikas who, after working on the banana farm, would collect cohune nuts to extract their oil. There was a small cohune oil factory with an industrial machine. Florencio Garcia and Donatilo Bustillos recalled that at the small plant the East Indians crushed the kernel and extracted the oil to be sent to Belize City for exportation. The plant was later abandoned, and the metal ruins were removed and used by Mennonites from Shipyard in the 1960s.

After World War I, yellow fever and influenza epidemics struck the north of Belize, which killed 2/3 of the then-Orange Walk District capital of San Esteban. As a result, the district capital was relocated to present-day Orange Walk Town. The death rate outran the pace of coffin-making, and a large hole was dug to bury the dead. Many recount the times when they were playing with friends who dropped dead in the middle of the game with their ears, nose, and mouth bleeding. Women dropped dead while cooking and infants, while being breastfed, started bleeding and died. It was a catastrophe in the community and across Belize. This, along with the devaluation of the Belize Dollar after WWII, and the scarcity of food caused by the war delaying food shipments to the West Indian territories, brought on economic distress and a greater need for self-sustainment, as England was going through an economic crisis. In the 1950s, a new group of people, fleeing religious persecution, came to Belize. The Mennonites, after various consultations and agreements with the governor, had their first settlement approved in Shipyard Village about 4–5 miles from the village. This brought employment to the people of Guinea Grass.

After Hurricane Hattie hit Belize, many Belizeans were granted residency to the United States. In the 1960s and 70s, people from Guinea Grass migrated to the US, along with other Belizeans. In the 1960s, during the rebuilding of the colony, Guinea Grass constructed a road connecting it to the present-day Philip Goldson Highway. In the early 1980s, Guinea Grass, along with San Felipe, August Pine Ridge, and San Lazaro, got electricity thanks to the newly elected Area Representative Onesimo Pech, who resided in the village at the time.

== Climate ==
Guinea Grass has a tropical monsoon climate (Köppen: Am).

Climate data for Guinea Grass
Month	Jan	Feb	Mar	Apr	May	Jun	Jul	Aug	Sep	Oct	Nov	Dec	Year
Daily mean °C (°F)	22.5 (72.5)	23.8 (74.8)	24.8 (76.6)	26.5 (79.7)	27.3 (81.1)	27.1 (80.8)	26.4 (79.5)	26.4 (79.5)	26.6 (79.9)	25.8 (78.4)	23.6 (74.5)	23.2 (73.8)	25.3 (77.5)
Average precipitation mm (inches)	97 (3.8)	49 (1.9)	47 (1.9)	40 (1.6)	104 (4.1)	228 (9.0)	175 (6.9)	168 (6.6)	263 (10.4)	220 (8.7)	135 (5.3)	90 (3.5)	1,616 (63.7)
Source: Climate-Data.org

== Demographics ==
=== Population ===
Ethnic Groups in Guinea Grass in 2015.
1. Mestizo (75.9%)
2. Latin Americans (12.0%)
3. Mixed and Coloureds (6.00%)
4. Creoles (3.70%)
5. Whites (1.00%)
6. Mayas (1.20%)
7. Asians (0.20%)

In the 2010 census, Guinea Grass had a population of 3,500. Of these, 87.9% were Hispanic, including the 79.9% of Mestizo, and the estimated 12% of Central American immigrants and refugees, 6% mixed, 3.7% Creole, 1% white (including Mennonite and Caucasian), 0.8% Mopan Maya, 0.3% Ketchi Maya, 0.2% Asian and 0.1% Yucatec Maya.

There is a sizeable Guinea Grass Villagers diaspora population of about 100–350, mainly in the United States (California, Miami, Texas, Illinois), Mexico, United Kingdom (East London, Edinburgh), Canada, and the Anglo-Caribbean islands.

=== Language ===
The village is predominantly a Mestizo community. About 80% of the population are Mestizo and Hispanic Belizeans. Spanish and English are the predominant languages of the community with Spanish and 'Spanglish' spoken mostly at home; English, taught at the primary schools, is used to access public services and on television. English Creole, along with Spanish, is used for trading with locals and other Belizeans. 89-92% of Guinea Grass residents can have a conversation in Spanish, but may tend to add English words along with it. 72% can have an conversation in English, while 80% of the population understands English. 52% of the population understands or can speak English Creole, which is a language on the rise in the village specially among the younger population. Spanglish, probably the most widely spoken language in the village, is a combination of Spanish and English.

=== Religion ===
Religion in Guinea Grass as of 2010.
1. Catholics (45.0%)
2. Protestants (41.0%)
3. Adventist (3.00%)
4. Other (11.0%)

Examples:

- Excuse me, where is the police station located? - Scuse, donde esta located el police station?
- What was your grade on the Spanish test? - Que fue tu grade en el Spanish test?
- What time does the bank open? I want to make a loan appointment. - Que time hace open el bank, porque quiero hacer un loan.

More than half of toddlers born from 2008 to 2018 understand both Spanish and English before entering school.

89% of the populations identifies with the Christian faith, while the other 11% have no religious affiliation. The high proportion of Christianity, specifically Catholicism, was influenced by the strong Spanish and Mestizo culture. Until the late 1950s, British and American missionaries along with Belizeans of Creole descent, brought to the village the Protestant Christian movement under the religious organization Full Gospel Church of God, which still stands today and is the oldest Evangelical denomination in the village. Soon after the Seventh-day Adventists came to establish a church in the village. In the early 1970s, the Full Gospel Church split.

A new Evangelical church and mission, called the Pentecostal Church of God (PCG) "Rock Of Ages", was established in the village. This was the pioneer church for the PCG World mission in Central America, and Belize specifically. Its church in Guinea Grass is the mother church of the PCG denomination in Central America and parts of the English West Indies. Although the PCG started in 1957 in Belize, it was not until the late 1960s to early 1970s that its first official church was established in Belize at Guinea Grass. At that time, the country was called British Honduras, changing its name to Belize in 1973. Until recently the Evangelical churches, which presently are 7 congregations, have grown to the extent that one out of two villagers is either a Roman Catholic or Evangelical Christian.

== Politics ==
The village was involved in the George Price Movement, concerning the right to vote, after the 1949 devaluation of the Belizean Dollar. Up to that time, only whites and certain people of colour (those who owned land) could vote or take part in government. In 1950, when the People's United Party (PUP) was formed, the villagers supported that party, especially since George Price lived in the village for a short period of time as a youth. They remained loyal to that Party until the late 1980s when Onesimo Pech, the first candidate from the village, decided to run for Area Representative of Orange Walk South for the United Democratic Party (UDP). Since then, the village has been a stronghold for the United Democratic Party and has the biggest number of registered voters for the Orange Walk South constituency.

The UDP had had the lead in village council elections, over the PUP, but in 2013, for the first time in the village history, a newly formed third party won the village council elections. The United Community Association of Guinea Grass (UCA) won, over the three-time consecutive reelected UDP council. In that election, the PUP had no candidates to run for the village council. In 2019, after more than 20 years, the PUP won the Village Council elections with a full slate, with Benito Uk becoming the new appointed chairman.

With regard to the national elections, the village of Guinea Grass is a key village to win an elected seat in the House of Representatives, as the village has the greatest number of voters for the Orange Walk South constituency. Thus, winning the village indicates a high possibility for a political party to have a winning area representative in the north and a seat in parliament.

== Education ==
The village hosts two public schools, one under the Roman Catholic Church and Ministry of Education Administration and the other under the Pentecostal Church of God Belize and Ministry of Education Administration. There is one private school that opened in 2023 administered by the Apostolic Church. There are no government schools in the village, but all schools must teach the Ministry of Education curriculum and must use Standard Caribbean or UK English in instruction.

70% have a primary school education; of the other 30%, that did not finish primary school, about 70% can read and write in both English and Spanish. The other 10% are illiterate. 45% have a secondary education, which has tripled in one decade, as only ~12% of the population had a secondary education in the 1990s. 30% have a tertiary education and a handful have graduate degrees.

As the official language of the country is English, all primary schools in Belize teach in English. The same thing applies to Guinea Grass from infant division to upper school (Standard 5 & 6); teaching is done in English, although teachers are allowed to use different languages for better illustration and understanding of the subject. This is especially helpful for foreigners and those whose first language is Spanish or Low German rather than English.

The village has two primary schools, Guinea Grass Pentecostal Primary School and Guinea Grass Roman Catholic Primary School.

Over the past 13 years the Guinea Grass Pentecostal School has ranked amongst the top 25 schools nationwide and has ranked among the top 3 schools in the district. The categories vary each year due to the number of Standard 6 students enrolled. (Each year they are on either the 25-35 categories or the 50- above category.)

Guinea Grass Pentecostal school	Guinea Grass R.C. School
397 students enrolled	425 students enrolled
Guinea Grass Pentecostal Pre-School	Guinea Grass R.C. Preschool
35 students enrolled	38 students enrolled

== Economy ==
The people of Guinea Grass once survived by practicing subsistence farming and working in the chicle industry as chicleros and cutting mahogany and log wood for the timber industry. The industry was owned by the British Honduras Estate, which became the Belize Estate in the early 1970s, a few years before Belize gained independence from the United Kingdom. Since the early 1970s, most of the people in the north, including in Guinea Grass, turned to the sugar industry, as factories were opened in Libertad Village and then at Tower Hill. According to the Sugar Cane Farmers Association Act of 2000, in the Orange Walk District Divisional Association, Guinea Grass falls under the following district branch: Guinea Grass, Tower Hill, Shipyard, Chan Pine Ridge, Carmelita, and Tiger Creek branch.

In the late 1980s after independence, with a wave of infrastructural development carrying across Belize, many labourers from the village learnt trades in masonry, carpentry, electricity, and plumbing. Most of the male labour force aged 35–50 are still in those trades. Many younger people now have office jobs, work in government, or own their own businesses. Many young adults who can not afford a higher education work in the tourism and hospitality industry.

Nowadays, many women also work and have a professional job, something rarely seen 20 years ago. About 45% of all household are double income households where both men and women work.

=== Housing and infrastructure ===
In the 1880s, houses were built in a primitive style. They were constructed from pimento stems (tasiste in Spanish) and the roofs were thatched with cohune palms. Some houses were also made with palm tree logs. To keep the inside cool, they plastered the walls with white marl. In the 1940s, the golden era of the sugarcane industry, colonial styled wooden houses similar to those in Belize City were built by affluent families. Many can still be seen in the colonial area of the village and on the main road.

After the 1961 hurricane, concrete houses with flat tops and concrete bungalow houses were built. Zinc or sheet metal houses are also commonly seen in present-day Guinea Grass, as they are more economic to build, but are not strong enough to withstand a hurricane.

The 1960s were the glory days of the sugar industry in Belize and the district of Orange Walk; Corozal had a higher standard of living because of this. People stopped doing subsistence farming and dedicated their work to the sugar industry and infrastructure. It was during this time that indoor plumbing was being introduced to communities outside of Belize City, the colonial capital city. People imported trucks and other vehicles from Germany, the United Kingdom, and the United States. Travelling and international flight was also new to the villagers; their simple way of life changed rapidly. Although much more development is still needed in the village due to many years of a stagnant economy, the village is now growing and thriving once again.

== Culture ==
=== Festivals ===
The village of Guinea Grass is mostly a Mestizo-dominated society heavily influenced by Spanish culture and tradition. Families are mostly patriarchal and the father gives or buys a piece of lot for his children before they become independent adults. Previously, only sons were eligible for this, but daughters became eligible as well by the mid-20th century. The Spanish language in the village has been modified by the village's long history and influence of the Mayan and English Creole languages. The village lifestyle has been heavily influenced by American, Jamaican and Mexican culture in ways of dressing, standards of living, and music. The most notable Mestizo tradition can be found on the food. Most typical foods from Guinea Grass are Mestizo foods such as salbutes, tamales, escabeche, chirmole, caldo (chicken soup), and tamalitos/dukunu. The village is also heavily influenced by Caribbean and Creole culture, as seen through many typical cuisines such as the national dish of rice and beans as well as boil-up, serre, cow foot soup, creole bread, meat pies, journey cake, fry jack, and dumplings. Traditional Yucatec Mayan dishes are also an element of the diverse cuisine of the village, with notable foods such as pibil, caldo, Perix P'aak, Pibil Ka'ax and pozole.

Some festivals and events hosted by the village include Easter, during which the village council sponsors family activities by the riverside at the New River Park; the September Celebrations commemorating the Battle of St George's Caye; a beauty pageant contest for Miss Guinea Grass on the 20th of September, who will parade the village streets after 1:00 PM on Independence Day, on the 21st, followed by a motorcade, going to Orange Walk town to watch the flag-raising ceremony and fireworks display.

=== Recreation centres ===
The village holds a functioning Community Health clinic and a Community Police Station in the Marcus Canul Area of the village; beside it is the village's football field.

The village has three parks: one located in the northeast part of the village, which also hosts the village library and Community Centre; another park is located by the river bank of the New River (hence the name New River Park), and beside it is also a football/cricket/softball field; the third park is located in the Felix Estate area and is mostly an empty field.

=== Telecommunication and Internet ===
Digi (formally known as Belize Telemedia Limited), Centaur Communications Corp. Ltd. and Smart are the three largest internet service providers in the village, with Digi and Smart being the only telecommunication service in the village and the rest of the country.

=== Radio stations ===
The village has one bilingual (English and Spanish) Christian internet radio channel, Stereo Luz Belize and shares an FM radio channel with Shipyard Village, a Christian bilingual (Plautdietsch and English) radio station called De Stemm Radio fa Belize 93.3 FM. Other AM and FM radio stations that can be listened through the area are those from Orange Walk Town, namely:

- Kairos Belize Radio 89.7
- Sugar City Radio Station (Orange Walk) (103.1 FM)
  - Home station of the UDP in Orange Walk
- Fiesta FM (Orange Walk) (106.7 FM)
  - See Centaur Cable Network
- Power FM 95.5
- East Radio 104.9 FM
- KREM Radio 91.1
- Estereo Amor 95.9
- Love FM Orange Walk Repeater 98.1
- More FM 107.1
