= Elijio Panti National Park =

National park in Belize

- Nojkaaxmeen Elijio Panti
- IUCN category II (national park)
- Location within Belize
- Location: Cayo District, Belize
- Coordinates: 17.0228111°N 89.060925°W
- Area: 5,264.5 hectares (13,009 acres)
- Established: 23 February 2001
- Governing body: Belize Development Foundation

Elijio Panti National Park nests within the buffer zone areas of Cristo Rey, San Antonio and El Progresso village and extending to parts of the Mountain Pine Ridge Reserve in the Cayo District, Belize. The park was established by the Itzamna Society and was signed into law as a national park by the Government of Belize on 23 February 2001. It encompasses 13 006 acres (20 sq. miles) of mountainous terrain with breath taking waterfalls, numerous natural pools, medicinal trails, a biodiversity of flora and fauna and an extensive cave system used by the ancient Mayas for sacrificial purposes. Above all, the national park serves as a memory of the late Dr. Elijio Panti, who is widely revered as the last Maya master healer of Belize.

== History ==
In 1998, worried by land disappearing and being destroyed, the community of San Antonio asked the Minister of Agriculture to help them create an official park. The first action was to form a committee, headed by María García and other five local people; a board of governors was formed afterwards, and this gave birth to the Itzamna Society for the protection and Conservation of the Environment and Culture and Community Development (Itzamna is God who created all things on Earth). This community development took place in January 2000 and included representatives from the three villages: El Progreso 7 miles, Cristo Rey Village, San Antonio Village. It also included the former police officers, doctors, teachers and tour guides.

In 1999, a negotiation process took place between the Itzamna Society and the government of Belize so the state could officially grant lands to the Society for the proposed National Park]. During the whole process the community received support from the NGO Help for Progress, Maya Center with the Cockscomb Basin Wildlife Sanctuary, Five Blue Lakes National Park with the community of Saint Margaret, El Pilar and the village of Bullet Tree, San Antonio cooperative, the Minister of Agriculture, the forestry department and Protected Areas Conservation Trust (PACT) from the government. The Society was legally registered as a NGO on the ninth of February, 2000.

The reserve area was officially turned into National Park on 23 February 2001 with the name of Elijio Panti after the name of a spiritual healer and high community priest, who dedicated his life to the village and the people and died in 1996 at the age of 103. After the official inauguration, a management plan was developed as well as training courses for local people, and other projects have been in process such as the exploration of the 30,000 acres of land to be declared for the preservation of Mayan medicinal plants, endangered species and for scientific research.

== Activities ==
The 13 006 acre reserve is host to a vast diversity of flora and fauna which adds to the biodiversity of the country. It consists of medicinal trails where the late Dr. Elijio Panti once hand-picked his herbs to cure people from all over the world. Due to its terrain, the park consist of magnificent waterfalls, the most famous being the Sakt’aj Waterfall.
