= Leroy Young =

- Born: 7 August 1967 (age 58); Belize City, Belize
- Occupation: Poet
- Known for: Dub poetry; performances on Channel 7 television

Leroy Young (born August 7, 1967), otherwise known as "The Grandmaster", is a Belizean dub poet.

== Biography and arts career ==
Young was born to Bernadean Young and attended St. Mary's Primary and the former St. Michael's College, now amalgamated into Anglican Cathedral College (ACC). He briefly starred in rap group Fresh Breeze with the Morgan Brothers, Kenny and Turbo, but eventually became addicted to drugs and got into various misdeeds, resulting in a trip to rehab after twice attempting suicide. In the late 1990s, after spending time in prison and drug rehabilitation, he turned to poetry and received a segment in the news broadcast on Channel 7 television station, improvising poems about stories in the news and whatever else.

He parlayed his time on Channel 7 into two books of poetry, Made in Pinks Alley and Generation X. His debut album Just Like That... was released on Stonetree Records in 2004. In 2017, the Image Factory Art Foundation released a DVD retrospective covering Young's career as a poet.

Young is a supporter of the People's United Party and appears on their radio station every Thursday hosting a show dedicated to the arts, "G2" (the other G standing for cohost Angela Gegg).
