= .bz =

Top-level Internet domain for Belize

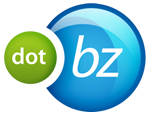
- Introduced: September 3, 1991; 35 years ago
- TLD type: Country code top-level domain
- Status: Active
- Registry: Belize Network Information Center (managed by University Management Ltd
- Sponsor: University of Belize
- Intended use: Entities connected with Belize
- Actual use: Used for a random assortment of sites, many not in Belize
- Registration restrictions: None
- Structure: Registrations can be made directly at the second level as well as at the third level beneath various second level labels
- Dispute policies: UDRP
- DNSSEC: yes
- Registry website: Belizenic

.bz is the Internet country code top-level domain (ccTLD) for Belize. It is administered by the University of Belize.

== Usage ==
At one point, .bz domains were being marketed by an American company as standing for "business", and that company took legal action against ICANN in an attempt to block the .biz domain as "unfair competition".

Currently, the registry is in Belize, administered by the University of Belize in Belmopan. It is still marketing the domain outside the country as "meaning business". Internationalized domains with a wide assortment of non-ASCII characters are also available.

== Domains ==
There are some second-level domains in use, however these are not required:

Domain	Intended purpose
.com.bz	Commercial
.edu.bz	Educational
.gov.bz	Government
.net.bz	Networking
.org.bz	Organisations

It also might have use for typosquatting for misspellings of .biz domains.

=== Domain hack ===
Many websites in Italy use this domain, because of the abbreviation of Bolzano, the capital of the province of South Tyrol, and the fact that the official abbreviation of the province is BZ. Many websites use the Italian subdomain .bz.it.

Servers for the open source game BZFlag often use names ending in .bz.

== See also ==
- Internet in Belize
