= Gerald Rhaburn =

Gerald "Lord" Rhaburn is a Belizean calypso, soca, reggae and brukdown musician. He became famous when performing with the Lord Rhaburn Combo in the 1970s and 1980s.

Rhaburn has toured frequently abroad promoting Belizean music.

In 2004 he hosted the first Lord Rhaburn Music Awards, an annual Belizean music awards show.
