= The Guardian (Belize) =

Belizean newspaper

- Front page of the February 12, 2017 edition
- Type: Weekly newspaper
- Format: Tabloid
- Owner(s): United Democratic Party
- Editor: Alfonso Noble
- Founded: 1998
- Political alignment: United Democratic Party
- Headquarters: Ebony St. & Bel China Bridge, P.O. Box 1898, Belize City, Belize
- Circulation: about 20,000
- Website: GUARDIAN website

The Guardian is a Belizean newspaper and the official print organ of the United Democratic Party. It is published on Thursdays and sells for BZ$1.

== UDP newspaper history before The Guardian ==
The UDP's history in the newspaper business starts with the Beacon, owned by Dean Lindo, which began printing in 1969 and was the main UDP newspaper (replacing The Reporter). The Beacon survived until 1994, but the last years of the newspaper saw it become slowly eclipsed by the new People's Pulse, headed first by Zelma Jex and later by William Ysaguirre and Ann-Marie Williams. The Pulse was the main newspaper for much of the 1990s but shut down like its predecessor after a UDP election loss in 1998.

== Formation ==
With the defunct People's Pulse scheduled for shutdown after the 1998 general elections, in which the UDP lost, it was thought that the party needed a new image. The Guardian was expected to be part of that new image. With this in mind, the first issue of the newspaper rolled off the press in October 1998, even as the Pulse faced unpaid bills.

== Current staff ==
- Editor: Alfonso Noble
- Marketing and Sales Manager: Ann Smith
- Reporter: Shane Williams
- Compositor: Adelie Patt
- Receptionist/Accounts Clerk: Vanessa Gillett
- Contributors (partial listing): Yasmine Andrews, Carlos Perdomo, Dr. George Gough, Michael Peyrefitte, Jamil Matar
  - Columns w/out byline: "Bits and Pieces" (periodically), "The Searchlight", "Women Today", "Politics Today", sports section.

== Editorial stance ==
As the official print organ of the United Democratic Party, The Guardian consistently criticizes the policies of the opposition People's United Party, whether in or out of government, similar to its PUP counterpart The Belize Times with regard to the UDP.

In March 2003, after the UDP lost elections called on the 5th of the month, editor Panton claimed the election was the worst managed in Belizean history and listed a number of instances he thought were proof of the Elections and Boundaries Department's perfidy toward the UDP. However, Panton was at the time a member of the EBD's parent body, the Elections and Boundaries Commission, and was seen to have embarrassed the Commission by his action. A similar incident occurred prior to the 2003 by-election in October contested by the March loser John Saldivar. Panton editorialized in the Guardian again about alleged abuses by the EBD and earned himself its ire once more, though Saldivar won the election anyway. Both cases went into the EBD's report of events in 2003, and Panton would eventually be replaced by John Avery.
