= John Avery (journalist) =

Belizean Public Utilities Commissioner and journalist

John Avery is Belizean Public Utilities Commissioner, and was a journalist.

== Life ==
In 2005, Avery became the editor of the Guardian newspaper, the chief media outlet of Belize's United Democratic Party. He is responsible for the weekly editorial and various columns in the newspaper, published on Thursdays.

Avery also appeared on radio on Thursday mornings to promote the newspaper and serves as a political commentator.

In 2008, he became Public Utilities Commissioner. The PUC is litigating against the electric utility, Belize Electricity Limited, and telephone company, Belize Telemedia Limited. This was controversial.
