= Christian Workers' Union =

Trade union in Belize

CWU
- Christian Workers' Union
- Founded: 1963
- Headquarters: Dean Street, Belize City, Belize
- Location: Belize
- Members: 2,500 (2006)
- Key people: Leonora Flowers, president Floyd Neal, secretary general Evan "Mose" Hyde, chief advisor/President Emeritus

The Christian Workers' Union is a trade union in Belize.

The union was founded in 1962 by Nicholas Pollard, bringing together former members of the Christian Democratic Union based in Belize City. In September, it was a founding affiliate of the National Federation of Christian Trade Unions, and it soon became its most important affiliate. Pollard moved to Trinidad in 1964, but returned to Belize in 1966 and took back leadership of the union. This caused resentment among its other leaders, and in 1968 he left, forming the short-lived rival union, Democratic Independent.

In 1969, the other affiliates of the National Federation of Christian Trade Unions left, to form the National Federation of Workers. The federation was dissolved, and the CWU became independent. It retained its strength, being particularly prominent in the public sector.

As of 2006, CWU claimed a membership of 2,500. It was a member of the International Trade Union Confederation, but withdrew in November 2009.
