= Presbyterian Church of Belize =

National Presbyterian Church in Belize
- Abbreviation: PCB
- Classification: Reformed Protestant
- Orientation: Evangelical Reformed
- Theology: conservative Calvinist
- Governance: Presbyterian
- Associations: Belize Presbyterian Theological Seminary; Presbyterian Church in America (PCA); Mission to the World; National Presbyterian Church in Mexico
- Region: Belize
- Origin: 1987; Belize

The Presbyterian Church of Belize (PCB) is a Protestant church in the Reformed tradition. It has a number of locations in the country. It also operates a medical clinic, a high school, primary education schools, and preschools

== History ==
The oldest Presbyterian church in Belize is St Andrew's Presbyterian Church in Belize City, which was established in 1850 by Scottish settlers with public financial support. Its reach was limited largely to the European population of Belize City; but in 1958, Presbyterian missionary Don Manuel Beltran was sent by the National Presbyterian Church in Mexico to work with Maya speakers in Belize. He gradually attracted congregations in Cristo Rey, San José, Patchakan, San Victor and Concepcion. St. Andrew's Presbyterian Church joined with Mayan and Spanish-speaking congregations and formed the national Presbyterian church of Belize in 1987, with support from the Presbyterian Church in America's "Mission to the World." A ministry among Belize's Chinese population was established in 1988.

== Churches ==
=== St. Andrew's Presbyterian Church ===
St. Andrew's was originally affiliated with the Free Church of Scotland and the first pastor served for almost 25 years. During the early years of the 20th century, the church was only open intermittently. At times it was administered by other branches of the Protestant church and at times considered merging with the Methodists and Anglicans. The church maintained its Presbyterian heritage, however, in spite of the pressure to merge.

=== Unity Presbyterian Church ===
Unity Presbyterian Church was built to establish a church in a poor area of Belize City that was struck hard by a hurricane in 2000 which caused severe flooding in the area. The church received assistance from charitable organisations.

=== Today ===
There are 17 churches and church plants in the country today.

== Seminary and education ==
Belize Presbyterian Theological Seminary was founded in 2004 to train pastors. Classes are held in English, which is the official language of Belize. The students are Mayan, Chinese, and Creole who study over a period of three years.

The president of the Seminary is Rev. Refael Ku, the board of directors comprises Belizean pastors, church elders, and MTW representatives. The Presbyterian Church of Belize also sponsors primary schools and high schools.

== Theology ==
=== Creeds ===
- Apostles' Creed
- Nicene Creed
- Athanasian Creed

=== Confessions ===
- Canons of Dort
- Heidelberg Catechism
- Westminster Confession of Faith
- Second Helvetic Confession
