= Telecommunications in Belize =

Telecommunications in Belize include radio, television, fixed and mobile telephones, and the Internet.

== Radio and television ==
- Radio stations: ~25 radio stations broadcasting on roughly 50 different frequencies (2007); state-run radio was privatized in 1998.
- Radios: 133,000 (1997).
- Television stations: 8 privately owned TV stations; multi-channel cable TV provides access to foreign stations (2007).
- Television sets: 41,000 (1997).

== Telephones ==
- Calling code: +501
- International call prefix: 00
- Main lines: 25,400 lines in use, 180th in the world (2012).
- Mobile cellular: 164,200 lines, 184th in the world (2012).
- Teledensity: fixed-line of slightly less than 10 per 100 persons; mobile-cellular approaching 70 per 100 persons (2011).
- Telephone system: Above-average system; domestic trunk network depends primarily on microwave radio relay (2011).
- Communications cable: Landing point for the Americas Region Caribbean Ring System (ARCOS-1) fiber-optic telecommunications submarine cable that provides links to South and Central America, parts of the Caribbean, and the US (2011).
- Satellite earth stations: 8 (2 Intelsat, 6 unknown) (2011).

== Internet ==
- Top-level domain: .bz, administered by the Belize Network Information Center at the University of Belize.
- Internet users: 81,930 users, 171st in the world; 25.0% of the population, 138th in the world (2012).
- Fixed broadband: 10,077 subscriptions, 148th in the world; 3.1% of the population, 115th in the world (2012).
- Wireless broadband: 419 subscriptions, 147th in the world; 0.1% of the population, 146th in the world (2012).
- Internet hosts: 3,392 hosts, 152nd in the world (2012).
- IPv4: 61,952 addresses allocated, less than 0.05% of the world total, 189.0 addresses per 1000 people (2012).
- Internet service providers: There are several ISPs in Belize: BTL, Speed Net, and others.

=== Internet censorship and surveillance ===
There are few government restrictions on access to the Internet and no credible reports that the government monitors e-mail or Internet chat rooms without judicial oversight. Prior to 2012, the government-owned telecommunications company blocked Voice over Internet Protocol (VOIP) services.

The law provides for freedom of speech and press and the government generally respects these rights in practice. The constitution prohibits arbitrary interference with privacy, family, home, or correspondence, and government authorities generally respect these prohibitions in practice. Law enforcement agencies may, with judicial oversight, intercept communications to obtain information in the interest of "national security, public order, public morals, and public safety." The law defines communication broadly to encompass the possible interception of communication by post, telephone, facsimile, e-mails, chat, and/or text messages whether encrypted or unencrypted or whether provided by public or private providers.

== See also ==
- Economy of Belize
