= Christian Democratic Union (Belize) =

Former trade union in Belize

The Christian Democratic Union (CDU) was a general union in Belize.

The union was established in 1956 by Nicholas Pollard, as a split from the General Workers' Union. Pollard had been accused of misusing funds donated by the Brotherhood of Sleeping Car Porters, intended to support victims of Hurricane Janet. The new union worked closely with the People's United Party (PUP), as the GWU had previously done. Pollard became general secretary of the new union, with Albert Cartouse as president, Lucas Marin as vice president, Leonard Jones as assistant secretary, and Louis Sylvestre as recording secretary.

The CDU was less influential in the PUP than the GWU had been, and it was only permitted to nominate two party candidates for the 1957 British Honduras general election. Pollard resigned from the PUP later in the year, and was replaced by Norman Lainfiesto as general secretary. Lainfiesto had no trade union background, and was expected to be loyal to the PUP, but unexpectedly decided to pursue an independent course. This was not successful, and the union was moribund by the early 1960s.
