= Alice Gibson =

Belizean librarian (1923–2021)

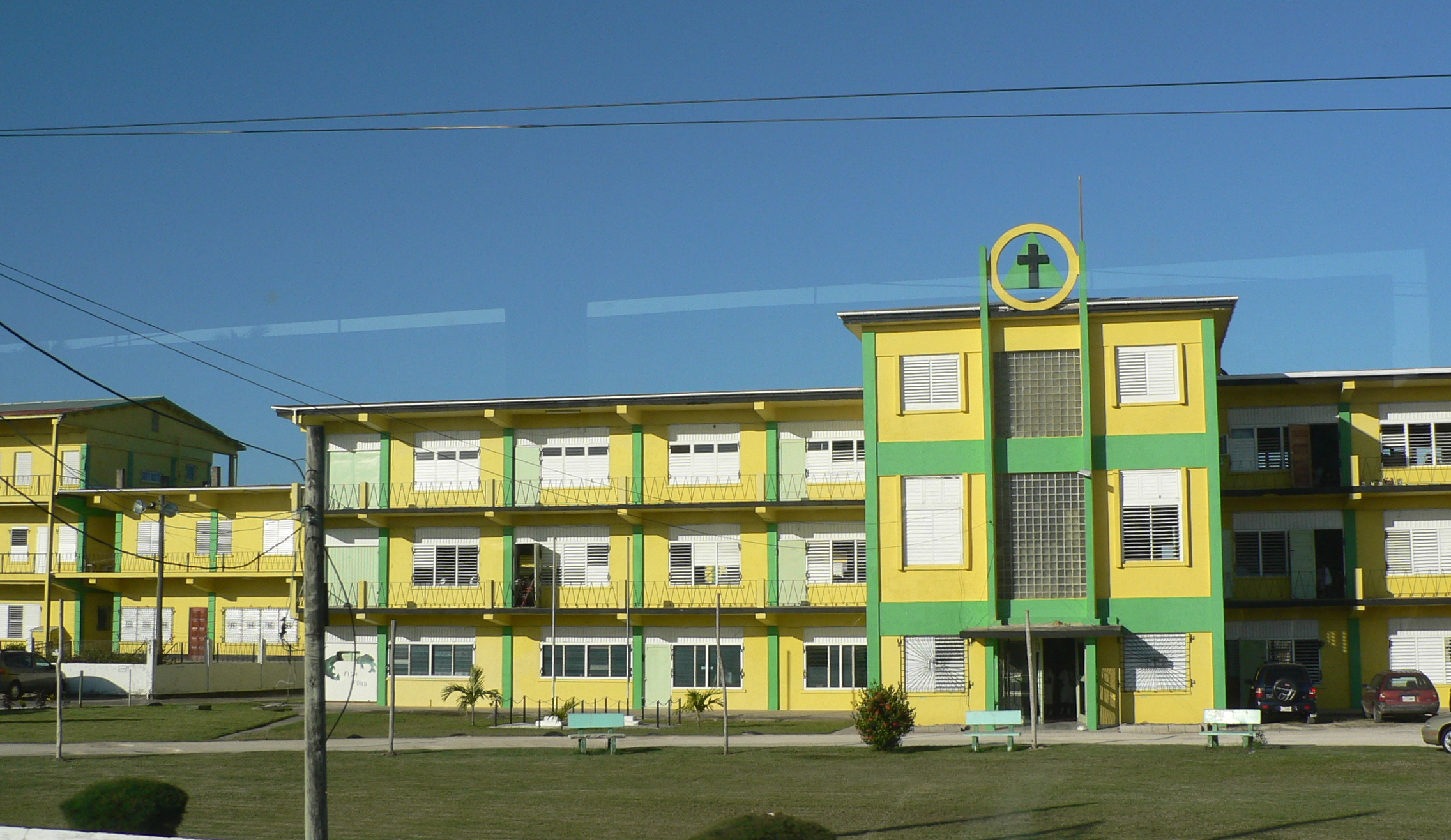
Pallotti High School for girls

Alice Gibson (3 September 1923 – 16 January 2021) was a chief librarian from Belize active in development of the country's library system. Beginning her career as a social worker, she became interested in fostering libraries throughout the country. She earned a degree from the British Library Service and founded libraries throughout the country. She worked at Pallotti High School in Belize City.

== Biography ==
Alice Gibson was born on 3 September 1923, in Belize City, British Honduras. She attended St. John’s Primary School. In her early career, she worked as a social worker and assisted in collecting data on poverty in Belize, including teenage pregnancy, and unemployment. She was a librarian and has been active in development of a library system for the country. She began as an assistant librarian in 1955 and founded reading groups for girls. She was qualified as a librarian in 1961 earning "Associate of the Library Association" degree from the British Library Association (as it was then known).

Gibson traveled the country training library personnel and developing rural libraries, helping to establish several dozen in the country. In 1976, she was appointed to Chief Librarian for the country and maintained that position until her retirement in 1978. After retirement, Gibson returned to work and in 1993, was serving as the principal librarian of the National Library Service. She later served as the head of the library at the Pallotti High School for girls of Belize City. In 2006, she was honored, along with other Chief Librarians, for contributions to the development of libraries in Belize.

She died in January 2021 at the age of 97.
