= Eldridgeville =

- Village
- Location within Belize
- Coordinates: 16.1368°N 88.8419°W
- Country: Belize
- District: Toledo
- Time zone: UTC-6 (Central)

Eldridgeville is a small village in Toledo District, Belize.
