= Louisville, Belize =

Village

Louisville is a village in the Corozal District of the nation of Belize, located at 18°19′N 88°30′W. According to the 2000 census, it had a population of 655 people mainly from Maya Mestizo ancestry.

Some substantial artificial mounds at Louisville are the remains of an ancient city of the Maya civilization. The site seems to have been occupied from about 400 BC to about 950 AD. Excavations, made here by Dr. Thomas Gann in the mid-1930s, uncovered polychrome stucco portrait heads.

Much of the ancient remains were demolished to reuse stone and make fill for roads. Further investigations and excavations of Louisville were made in 2000.
