= Belize Botanic Gardens =

Coordinates: 17°5′N 89°04′W

The Belize Botanic Gardens (BBG) is a collection of native and exotic plants growing on 45 acres (18 ha) in the Cayo district of western Belize. The BGG is situated in a valley on the banks of the Macal River, surrounded by the Maya Mountain foothills.

== History ==
The BGG is the creation of an American couple, Judy and Ken DuPlooy, formerly of South Carolina. One day in 1987, they packed up their family and started driving south. Their SUV became bogged down in mud in the rainy season, leaving them stranded in San Ignacio, Belize. They settled down there, purchasing an 8-hectare (20-acre) farm. They bought an adjoining 18 hectares (44 acres) in 1993.

The couple began organically growing exotic fruits, such as the custard apple and star fruit, expanding to include native palms and orchids. By 1997, the collection of plants had grown to such an extent that Ken was encouraged to apply for botanic garden status, a first in Belize.

== Plants ==
The BGG has about 1000 of the 4000 plant species native to Belize, among them cycads, heliconias, gingers and orchids, as well as Swietenia macrophylla, Terminalia buceras, Cnidoscolus aconitifolius and Anthurium schlechtendalii. All 40 native palms are cultivated here, as well as 50 from elsewhere. As of 2001, there were 400 tree species. Several threatened Cuban species are also present.

== Education ==
The main focus of the BBG is encouraging sustainable agriculture, maintaining conservation collections and engaging in conservation education. Courses are offered to students from all around the world, targeting native youths with limited opportunities. A pilot program teaching 15 local families how to grow their own food, using materials supplied by the BGG, aims at spreading this approach nationwide.
