= Xaibe =

- Location within Belize
- Coordinates: 18°23′N 88°26′W
- Country: Belize
- District: Corozal District

Government
  - Type: Village Council
  - Body: Xaibe Village Council
  - Chairman: Luciano Noh

Area
  - City: 14.245 km^{2} (5.500 sq mi)
  - Land: 14.245 km^{2} (5.500 sq mi)
  - Water: 0 km^{2} (0 sq mi) 0%
  - Urban: 5.010 km^{2} (1.934 sq mi)
- Elevation: 14.0208 m (46.000 ft)

Population (2010)
  - City: 1,575
- Time zone: UTC-6 (Central)

Xaibe (/ʃaɪˈbeɪ/) is a small rural settlement in the country of Belize mainly consisting of people from the Yucatec Maya ethnicity. It is located in Corozal District. The name Xaibe literally means 'crossroads'. The people of the Maya civilization often traversed across the village to reach other Maya villages. The population of the village is very small. The last available data of the population of Xaibe in 2010 revealed that it had a modest population of approximately 1,575 people. There is, however, evidence of the fact that the people belonging to the Maya civilization resided in the Xaibe village. These people then gradually shifted to Mexico, just across the border at the time of the Caste War of Yucatán. The village is known for celebrating the Maya tradition Hanal Pixan which means "food for the souls" also known as Day of the Dead.

== Demographics ==
At the time of the 2010 census, Xaibe had a population of 1,575. Of these, 96.2% were Mestizo, 1.5% Mixed, 0.6% Creole, 0.5% Mennonite, 0.3% Caucasian, 0.3% East Indian, 0.3% Ketchi Maya, 0.1% Asian, 0.1% Mopan Maya, 0.1% Yucatec Maya and 0.1% others.

In terms of languages spoken (multiple answers allowed), 98.4% spoke Spanish, 59.7% English, 7.9% Creole, 4.4% Yucatec Maya, 0.2% German, 0.2% Ketchi Maya, 0.2% Mopan Maya, 0.1% Mandarin or Cantonese and 0.1% other languages; 0.1% could not speak.

== Disasters ==
Because of its location on the Caribbean coastline, it is vulnerable to tropical cyclones; Hurricane Janet and Hurricane Dean, both Category 5 storms, made landfall near Xaibe village in 1955 and 2007 respectively. The village was badly damaged by Hurricane Janet in 1955 and was substantially rebuilt.

== Access ==
The nearest airports to the region include the San Pedro International Airport which is only 3 mi (4.82 km) away, the Philip S. W. Goldson International Airport being 60 mi (96.5 km) far and the Chetumal International Airport located 10 mi(16.09 km) away at neighboring country Mexico. The cities and towns close to Xaibe are Xcanluum, Patchakan, Chan Chen, Carolina, Calcutta, San Antonio, Ranchito and San Andres. Xaibe is also located only 2.5 mi (4 km) from the District's Capital, Corozal Town located at the Corozal bay.

== Education ==
Xaibe Roman Catholic School, also known as Xaibe R.C. School, is the only school within the village. It has three divisions. The Infant Division comprises Infant I, Infant II, and Standard I for pupils aged five to seven. The Middle Division comprises Standards II and III for pupils aged eight to ten. The Upper Division comprises Standards IV to VI for pupils aged eleven to thirteen, who prepare for the Primary School Examination before graduation.

== Politics ==
The village as a whole has repeatedly voted the UDP village council, headed by Luciano Noh, for over 6 years and community affairs have – according to nearly all residents – worked well under the current council. However, as is the case throughout Belize, finances are getting tighter and employment opportunities scarcer, and villagers from Xaibe are not immune to ‘feeling the pinch’. Shop-keepers complain of heightened competition between vendors, a situation made worse by the overall decreasing demand for goods as more villagers are forced to rely on contraband Mexican goods solely to be able to provide for themselves and their families as inflation continues to afflict rural communities throughout our country.

== Economy ==
The majority of villagers made their wealth during the climax of the sugar cane industry, and villagers are grateful to the past economy for having provided houses and land which, in today's tight times, would be impossible to acquire. However, the labour force of Xaibe today has forcibly become more fluid, adjusting to new industries and job vacancies that will at least provide a bare minimum salary, such as at the nearby Fruta Bomba papaya farm, and in the retail and service industry in the Free Zone and border Casinos. For those who have not been able to secure employment locally, many have left the village to join more promising tourist industries in the Cayes and elsewhere in the country, although the current economic crisis is warranting many of these to suffer unemployment or underemployment too.

== Climate ==
The climate in Xaibe is subtropical, similar to that in central or south Florida. In winter, temperatures may drop to the high 50s F at night, but there's never a frost. In spring and summer, the thermometer may hit the low 90s at midday and drop only to the 70s at night.

Climate data for Xaibe
Month	Jan	Feb	Mar	Apr	May	Jun	Jul	Aug	Sep	Oct	Nov	Dec	Year
Mean daily maximum °C (°F)	24.3 (75.7)	25.1 (77.2)	26.4 (79.5)	26.7 (80.1)	25.8 (78.4)	25.1 (77.2)	24.8 (76.6)	24.8 (76.6)	24.9 (76.8)	24.7 (76.5)	24.4 (75.9)	24 (75)	25.1 (77.1)
Mean daily minimum °C (°F)	24.2 (75.6)	24.7 (76.5)	25.3 (77.5)	25.9 (78.6)	26 (79)	26.5 (79.7)	26.9 (80.4)	26.2 (79.2)	25.6 (78.1)	25.1 (77.2)	24.5 (76.1)	23.9 (75.0)	25.4 (77.7)
Average precipitation mm (inches)	99.3 (3.91)	25.7 (1.01)	19.8 (0.78)	27.1 (1.07)	90.8 (3.57)	200.8 (7.91)	153.5 (6.04)	130.6 (5.14)	219.8 (8.65)	183.6 (7.23)	109.4 (4.31)	102.8 (4.05)	1,363.2 (53.67)
Source: National Meteorologic Institute of Belize
