= San Pablo, Orange Walk =

San Pablo
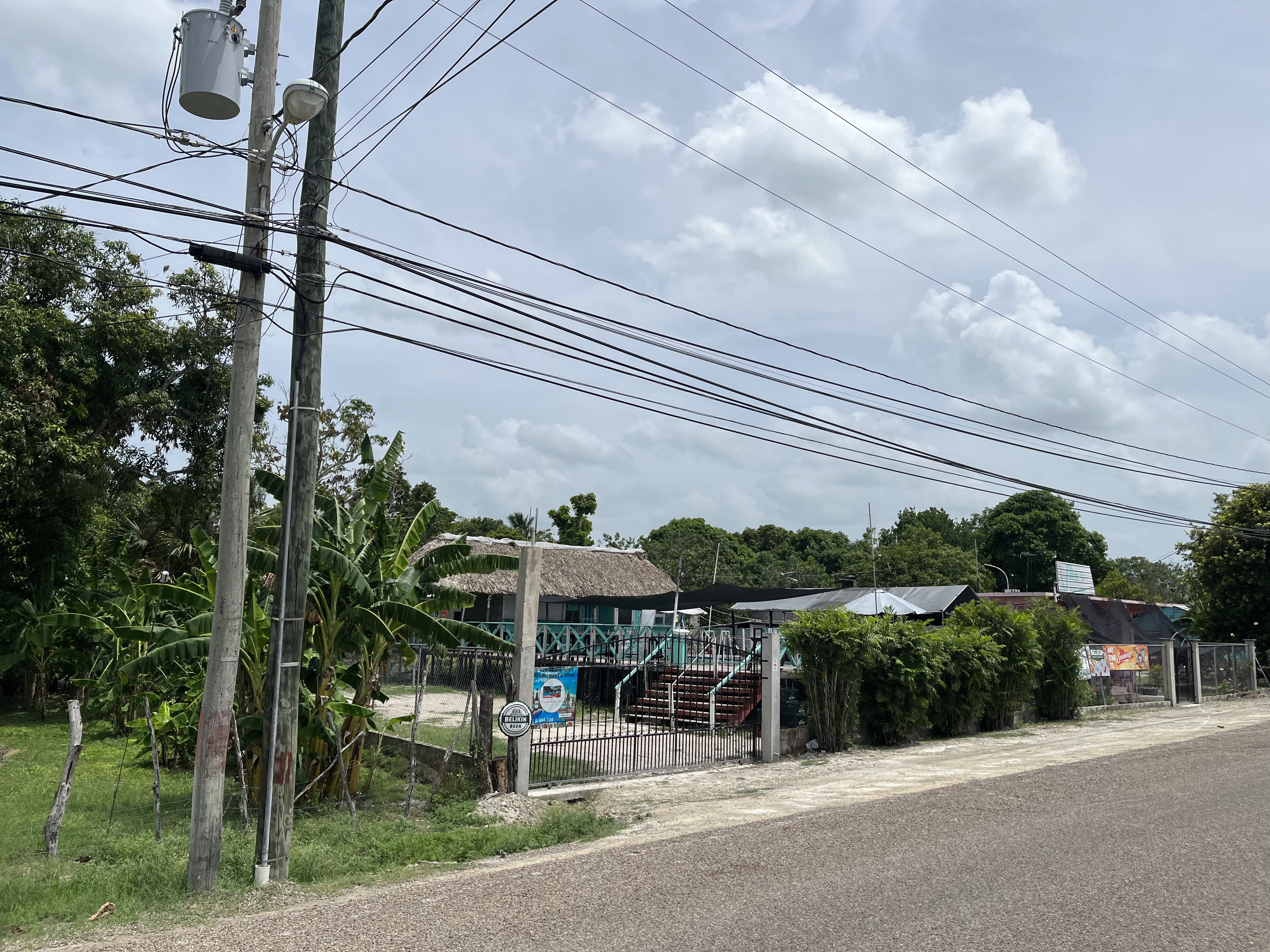

- Location within Belize
- Coordinates: 18°12′35″N 88°33′42″W
- Country: Belize
- District: Orange Walk District

Population (2000)
  - Total: 926
- Time zone: UTC-6 (Central)

San Pablo is a village in the Orange Walk District of the nation of Belize. At the 2000 census the population was 926. The people of the village are mainly of Yucatec Maya(Maya Mestizo) Descent. Most of the villagers of San Pablo speak Spanish inside the village but they also understand English. Many of the elders continue speaking Yucatec Maya.

The village had milpas since 1886 but was permanently settled around 1915 by Maya people who came from the Caste War of Yucatán. Many before reaching San Pablo, lived a semi Nomadic life moving from one place to another seeking new land to do milpas and the search for peace.
