= Consejo =

Village in Corozal District, Belize

Coordinates: 18°27′30″N 88°18′00″W

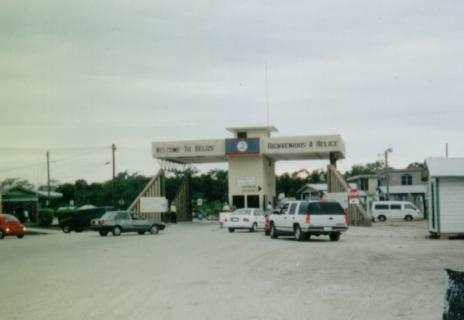
Mexico–Belize border at Consejo

Consejo is a village in the north of Corozal District, Belize. Consejo is located on a point of land where the bays of Corozal and Chetumal meet. Consejo is about 8 miles (12.9 km) from the district capital of Corozal Town, and 2 miles (3.2 km) across the water from Chetumal, Mexico.

It also features a subdivision/neighborhood of waterfront or near waterfront homes named Consejo Shores.

== Demographics ==
At the time of the 2010 census, Consejo had a population of 351. Of these, 64.1% were Mestizo, 29.3% Caucasian, 2.3% African, 2.3% Mixed, 0.6% Creole, 0.6% Mennonite, 0.3% Asian and 0.3% Ketchi Maya.

In terms of languages spoken (multiple answers allowed), 90.4% spoke English, 64.5% Spanish, 1.5% Creole, 0.3% German, 0.3% Mandarin or Cantonese, 0.3% Yucatec Maya and 0.3% other languages.
