= Armenia, Belize =

Armenia
- Location within Belize
- Coordinates: 17.1553°N 88.7464°W
- Country: Belize
- District: Cayo
- Constituency: Cayo South

Population (2010)
  - Total: 1,395
- Time zone: UTC-6 (Central)
- Climate: Af

Armenia is a village in the Cayo District of Belize, along the nation's Hummingbird Highway south of the capital, Belmopan.

== History ==
The first settlers in the area were immigrants from Guatemala, El Salvador, or Honduras, trying to escape the ravages of civil war. Both Mopan and K’ekchi Maya people also moved to the area from southern Belize in order to have better access to health care, transportation and a market in which to sell their crops.

== Location and geographic setting ==
Armenia is set in the foothills of the Mayan Mountain Range and is surrounded by jungle, caves, rivers and wildlife.

== Demographics ==
At the time of the 2010 census, Armenia had a population of 1,395. Of these, 66.6% were Mestizo, 19.7% Mopan Maya, 9.7% Ketchi Maya, 2.4% Mixed, 0.9% Creole, 0.1% Asian, 0.1% Garifuna, 0.1% Mennonite, 0.1% Caucasian, 0.1% East Indian and 0.1% Yucatec Maya.
