= Stann Creek Ecumenical Junior College =

College in Belize

Coordinates: 16.963184°N 88.226429°W

Stann Creek Ecumenical Junior College is a college in Dangriga, Belize.

== History ==
Stann Creek Ecumenical High School first opened its doors in September 1974. This ended denominational separation in secondary education, for Stann Creek Ecumenical High School (Ecumenical) was the product of the amalgamation of the former Stann Creek High School (Anglican) and Austin High School (Catholic). An Ecumenical Commission, consisting of the heads of three major religious denominations — Catholic, Anglican, and Methodist — oversaw the early growth of the institution into a regional center of learning, serving the entire Stann Creek District and beyond. By 1983, the Ecumenical Commission requested the Ministry of Education to assume responsibility for the institution. In response to this request, a new Board of Governors was appointed.

In 1986, a Sixth Form Division was established at the request of the Ministry of Education. This division's first emphasis was on Business Studies, but gradual expansion added General Studies, Primary Education, Tourism, Business Science, and Art/Science programs. At the same time, the Sixth Form was renamed "Junior College" to facilitate the transfer of credits to United States colleges, and an Evening Division was added to meet increasing demands for tertiary-level education.

Furthermore, in response to the community's need for secondary level extension services, Evening Sessions of the Secondary School Division commenced in September 2001. Two years later, the needs and growth of the secondary and tertiary divisions warranted their separation into autonomous entities still under the direction of the Board of Governors. Consequently, in September 2003, the Junior College, headed by a Dean, was officially separated from the High School, which was headed by a principal. In June 2008, the Junior College was given its own Board of Governors, thereby completing the process of separating the High School from the Junior College.

As years progressed, Stann Creek Ecumenical Junior College has had an increase in population. In 2014, the junior college had enrolled over 300 students. Students now partake in ATLIB (Association of Tertiary Level Institutions of Belize), where there are several sporting disciplines that play against other universities and junior colleges — including volleyball, basketball, softball, and football. As the population increases for the high school, the population at the junior college also increases.

Stann Creek Ecumenical Junior College signed a memorandum of understanding with the University of Belize in 2024, allowing graduates to transfer their credits to the university and complete a bachelor's there in two years.

== Demographics ==
A plurality of students at the college (31%) are Garifuna; students are also of other ethnicities, including Kriol, Mestizo, Maya, and others.
