= Port Loyola Calvary Chapel =

Protestant church in Belize City, Belize

Port Loyola Calvary Chapel is a Calvary Chapel Fellowship in Belize City, Belize. The church was founded on October 31, 2004, by Pastor Kenneth Welch.
