= Elijio Panti =

Don Eligio Panti (1893 – February 4, 1996) was a Guatemala-born Mayan Belizean traditional healer who used Mayan herbal medical techniques.

== Life ==
Beginning in 1931 he practiced his art of healing in San Antonio, a village of Mopan and Yucatecan Maya people. Although he could never read or write, alongside his teacher, Don Elijio enthusiastically learned about Maya medicine. Don Elijio Panti was not born in the country of Belize, he was a native of Guatemala and brought to the country of Belize as an infant.

== Works ==
In the mid 1980s, he began participation in a collaborative project of the Ix Chel Tropical Research Foundation and The New York Botanical Garden. This project was an effort to survey the forests of Belize for the collection of medicinal plants for screening against AIDS and cancer in association with the U.S. National Cancer Institute (NCI). Don Elijio participated in a great deal of field work. His knowledge resulted in the collection of hundreds of plant samples for this important endeavor. Even now plants collected through Don Elijio's knowledge and collaboration are being evaluated for their use in contemporary medicine.

In recognition of his many international contributions, he was awarded the "Distinguished Citizen Award" (University College of Belize), "Most Valuable Senior Citizen" (Help Age Belize), "Distinguished Contribution to Science" (The New York Botanical Garden), and Member of the Order of the British Empire" (Her Majesty Queen Elizabeth II, Queen of Belize).

Don Elijio's work and his life story were immortalized in two books, Rainforest Remedies: One Hundred Healing Herbs of Belize (1993), and Sastun: My Apprenticeship With A Maya Healer (1994). Panti died in Cayo on February 4, 1996 at the age of 103. Elijio Panti National Park, which was officially created in 2001, is named after him.
