= Chumba =

African traditional form of music and dance

Chumba is a traditional form of music and dance performed by the Garifuna people in several Central American countries. Like punta (another type of Garifuna music), chumba songs are highly polyrhythmic, but have a slower tempo.

The chumba dance is a solo dance performed by a woman, often exhibiting a large degree of individual style.
