= Rheinau =

Rheinau may refer to:

- Rheinau, Switzerland, a town in the canton of Zürich
- Rheinau Abbey, in Rheinau, Switzerland
- Rheinau (Baden), a town in Baden-Württemberg, Germany
- a part of Mannheim, Germany
- Rhinau, Bas-Rhin, France
