= Trial Farm =

- Location within Belize
- Country: Belize
- District: Orange Walk District

Population (2010)
  - Total: 4,264
- Time zone: UTC-6 (Central)

Trial Farm is a village near Orange Walk Town in the Orange Walk District of the nation of Belize. According to the 2000 census, it had a population of 3,443 people. It is located at 29 metres above sea level.

Operation New Horizons 2007 commanded by the Louisiana Army National Guard built two additional rooms on to the school at Trial Farm between 17 March - 12 May 2007.

== Demographics ==
At the time of the 2010 census, Trial Farm had a population of 4,264. Of these, 82.7% were Mestizo, 7.1% Creole, 5.3% Mixed, 2.1% Garifuna, 0.8% Mennonite, 0.5% Asian, 0.4% Mopan Maya, 0.3% Ketchi Maya, 0.3% East Indian, 0.2% Yucatec Maya, 0.1% Caucasian and 0.1% others.
