= Actun Box Ch'iich' =

Cave in Belize

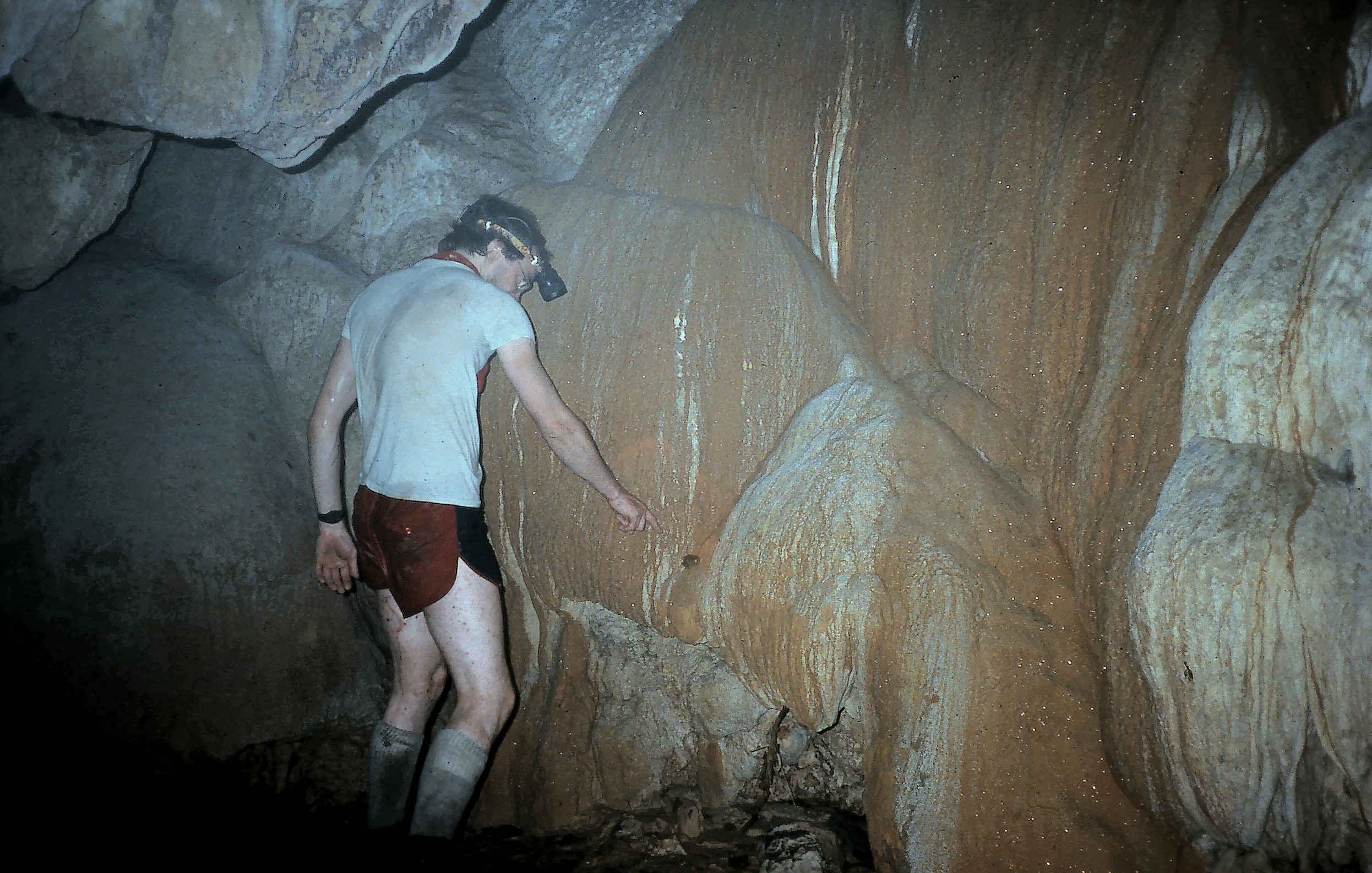
- Flowstone within Actun Box Ch'iich'
- Location: Belize
- Depth: -183m
- Discovery: 1989
- Entrances: 2
- Translation: Cave of the Black Birds

At -183m, Actun Box Ch'iich' (Cave of the Black Birds) is the deepest cave in the country of Belize. Located above Roaring Creek in the Cayo District, it is one of several caves explored and documented by British and Canadian cavers during a three-week expedition in 1989. The cave contains a small stream and has both an upper and lower entrance, making a through-trip possible.
