= Toledo Settlement =

Town in Belize

Toledo is a town in Belize's Toledo District.

Toledo Settlement is located at 16°8′0″N 88°49′0″W, at an elevation of 37 meters above sea level. It was originally settled by Caucasian American refugees from the United States who had fled during the American Civil War.
