= Centaur Cable Network =

Centaur Cable Network, Channel 3, is a television station and multimedia company operating from Orange Walk District, Belize, since 1989.

Centaur Cable is the North's most popular cable company, and City-based Channel 5 and Channel 7 often rely on CTV (as its name is usually shortened to) for news from the North.

== Companies associated with Centaur Cable ==
- Channel 3 News (Centaur TV)
- Fiesta FM (106.7) (Radio)
