= Wesley Junior College =

Christian college in Belize City

Coordinates: 17.48728°N 88.19040°W

- Other names: WJC
- Motto: Providing quality education in a Christian environment
- Type: University
- Established: 1930s
- Location: Belize City, Belize
- Colors: Blue, white & red
- Website: wjc.edu.bz

Wesley Junior College (WJC) is a Christian college in Belize. It offers innovative educational programs at the junior college level in business, science.

== History ==
The college dates back to June 1882 when the Methodist Church inaugurated the first secondary school in Belize: the British Honduras-Wesley High School with five boys and Reverend T.N. Robert as principal. It moved to its present location in 1889.

In the 1930s, the first sixth form program in the country was added. However, after many years of successful running, the college ran into financial difficulties and was forced to close in the 1970s. In 1987, attempts were made to restart the college with a Business Studies Tertiary level program but lack of funding meant that the reopening of the college was delayed many years.

In 1995 new efforts were started to reopen the sixth form; it was not until 2003 that Wesley Junior College had reopened. Upon reopening, the Wesley Junior College had 50 students enrolled in two programs — the associate degree in General Studies and the one-year Adult Continuing Education Program. On May 20, 2006, Wesley Junior College had its first graduation after reopening.

== Programs of study ==
- Ace
- Business
- Paralegal Studies
- General Studies without History
- General Studies with History
- Information Technology

== Affiliations ==
Wesley Junior College is a member of ATLIB and COBEC.

== Campus ==
Wesley Junior College is primarily an evening institution which shares a campus with Wesley College, a secondary school. During the day (8:00 am – 5:00 pm) the school campus is used primarily by Wesley College. After 5:00 pm the campus is used as a six form: Wesley Junior College. Administration duties for each school division is carried out through separate buildings.

The institution's opening hours (5:30 pm – 8:30 pm) allows students to pursue a degree while being able to work an average work day.

As of 2012 Wesley Junior College offers childcare services: Students who are parents may attend classes while having their children looked after.
