= Galen University =

Independent University in Belize

- Motto: Foundations For Life
- Type: Private university
- Established: 2003
- President: Dr. Rene Villanueva Sr.
- Provost: Dr. Cynthia Eve Aird
- Address: 64 George Price Highway, Cayo, Belize
- Campus: Rural
- Colors
- Nickname: Eagles
- Mascot: Harpy eagle
- Website: www.galen.edu.bz

Galen University is an independent university in Belize, Central America, with sustainable development as one of its core values. Its main campus is in Central Farm at mile 64 George Price Highway, in the Cayo District. The university is chartered and recognized by the Ministry of Education of the Government of Belize to offer degrees at undergraduate and graduate levels in educational programs such as business, arts, sciences, and education. About 95 percent of the students are Belizean students seeking Bachelor's and Master's degrees. The remainder are students participating in study abroad programs. The institution was established in 2003.

== History ==
Galen University was founded in September 2003 with an initial intake of 14 students and is Belize's only privately administered tertiary institution. Galen's first program offerings were bachelor's degrees in Business Administration, Agriculture and Tourism Management.

== Academics ==
=== Faculties ===
- Faculty of Arts, Science and Technology
- Faculty of Business and Entrepreneurship
- Faculty of Education

Programs of study include:

=== Faculty of Arts, Science, and Technology ===
- Anthropology
- Computer Science
- Criminal Justice
- Environmental Science
- Veterinary Technician
- Master in Development Studies
- Master in Social Work

=== Faculty of Business and Entrepreneurship ===
- Accounting
- Business Administration
- Economics
- Entrepreneurship
- Hospitality and Tourism Management
- International business
- Marketing
- Master in Business Administration
- Master in Economics
- Certificate in Accounting

=== Faculty of Education ===
- Elementary Education
- Secondary Education
- Master of Education in Secondary Education Leadership

Diploma Programs

- Certificate in Education Leadership

== Governance ==
Galen University is governed by a board of trustees headed by a chairman. The government, conduct, management, and control of the academic aspects of the university are vested in this board. The board of trustees includes:

- Dr. Marcelino Avila
- Mrs. Britany Meighan Rancharan
- Dr. Daniel Silva (Hons.)
- Dr. Godwin Hulse (Hons.)
- Mr. Hugh O'Brien
- Ms. Beverly Wade
- Ms. Becky Bernard
- Dr. Cynthia Eve Aird
- Dr. Rene Villanueva Sr. (Hons.)

== Applied research ==
Galen University has an applied research and development institute (GUARD) engaged in sustainable social, cultural, environmental, political and economic development projects. GUARD works with Central American and Caribbean government departments, non-governmental organizations (NGOs), and the private sector to address social and environmental issues. Galen University offers technical assistance and coordination services to these organizations. A university-wide approach is taken through the use of faculty, staff, and students trained for data collection and data entry. This extension of Galen's resources creates learning opportunities and facilitates the power of networking with other worldwide institutions or organizations.

== Name ==
Galen University was named in honor of the Greek scholar and physician, Galen, who lived from 130 to 220 A.D.
