= Independence Junior College =

Coordinates: 16.537273°N 88.426579°W

- Type: Public
- Established: 2007
- Location: Independence Village, Belize
- Nickname: IJC

Independence Junior College was established in 2007 to offer tertiary-level education opportunities in Independence Village, Stann Creek District, Belize.
