= Tropical Vision Limited =

Channel 7 (Tropical Vision Limited)
- Belize City, Belize
- Channels: Analog: 7 (VHF)
- Branding: "Channel 7"

Programming
- Affiliations: CBS, NBC, BBC World News, CNN, ESPN, NGC

Ownership
- Owner: Tropical Vision Limited

History
- Founded: 1981

Tropical Vision Limited, or as it is locally known, Channel 7, is a Belize City based television station operating since 1981.

Its managing director is Nestor Vasquez.

== History ==
During the 1990s, the station was receivable nationwide through three relay transmitters.

== Programming ==
Channel 7 airs a mix of American and Belizean programmes.

== 7 News ==
Prior to 1994, Channel 7 got its news from local radio powerhouse Radio Belize. Beginning on 14 February 1994, 7 News began producing its own newscast, running opposite Great Belize Television's News 5 Live at 6:30 PM Central. There are no regular weekend newscasts other than Friday repeats; 7 News has aired two one-time only Saturday evening newscasts, the latest coming in April 2005 in the midst of the protests in Belize.

== Criticism ==
Channel 7 is usually more critical of Government foibles than rival Channel 5, and Government officials have pointedly criticized 7 for its hard-hitting analysis of national issues.

== Employees of Channel 7 ==
- Nestor Vasquez (Managing Director)
- Jules Vasquez (News Director/chief news Editor/reporter)
- Indira Craig (Newscaster)
- Courtney Weatherburne (Reporter/newscaster)
- Daniel Ortiz (Reporter)
- Sahar Vasquez(Reporter)
- Angel Noble (Camera)
- Cody Noralez (Camera)
- Dennis Ellis (Camera)
- Melissa Ramsey (Office Manager)

== Trivia ==
In the late 1990s, poet Leroy "Grandmaster" Young got his start on Channel 7 reciting poems at the end of the newscast. Other former employees of Seven include Rodel Beltran Perera, Dennis Peyrefitte, Carla Ayres, Dawn Sampson, Deadra Isaacs (now Haylock), Alfonso and Fortunato Noble and Jim McFadzean and Jacqueline Woods
