= Wilfred Peters =

Wilfred Peters Mr. Peetaz MBE
- Also known as: Belizean Icon, Kriol Brukdong Music
- Born: April 15, 1931; Belize
- Origin: Belize
- Died: June 9, 2010 (aged 79) Belize
- Genres: Belize Creole Brukdown Music, Folk Music, Kriol Myoozik
- Occupations: Musician, Accordionist, Founder of Mr. Peetaz Boom and Chime Band, Belizean Icon - "King of Brukdown (Brukdong) Music in Belize"
- Instrument: Accordion Kriol Musical instruments
- Formerly of: Mr. Peters (Peetaz) Boom & Chime Band

Wilfred Peters (Sr.) MBE (April 15, 1931 – June 9, 2010), better known as Mista Peetaz, was a musical artist in the Brukdown style (Brukdong Myoozik in Belize Creole) in Belize. He was a pioneer of the music of Belize's Creole (Kriol) people called Brukdown or Brukdong (in Belize Creole). His favourite instrument was the accordion. He was also a band leader and toured Europe and North America with his band, the Boom & Chime Band, which is also known as Mista Peetaz Boom and Chime Band. Mr. Peters was awarded an MBE by Queen Elizabeth in 1997 for his cultural contributions to the development of music.

Mr. Peters is a Belize National Icon. He was one of the country's best loved musicians and he will always be remembered. After over 60 years of playing, he defined Belizean Creole culture through his distinctive Brukdown music style.
