= Valley of Peace, Belize =

Valley of Peace
- Location within Belize
- Coordinates: 17°20′N 88°50′W
- Country: Belize
- District: Cayo
- Constituency: Cayo South

Population (2007)
  - Total: 2,108
- Time zone: UTC-6 (Central)
- Climate: Am

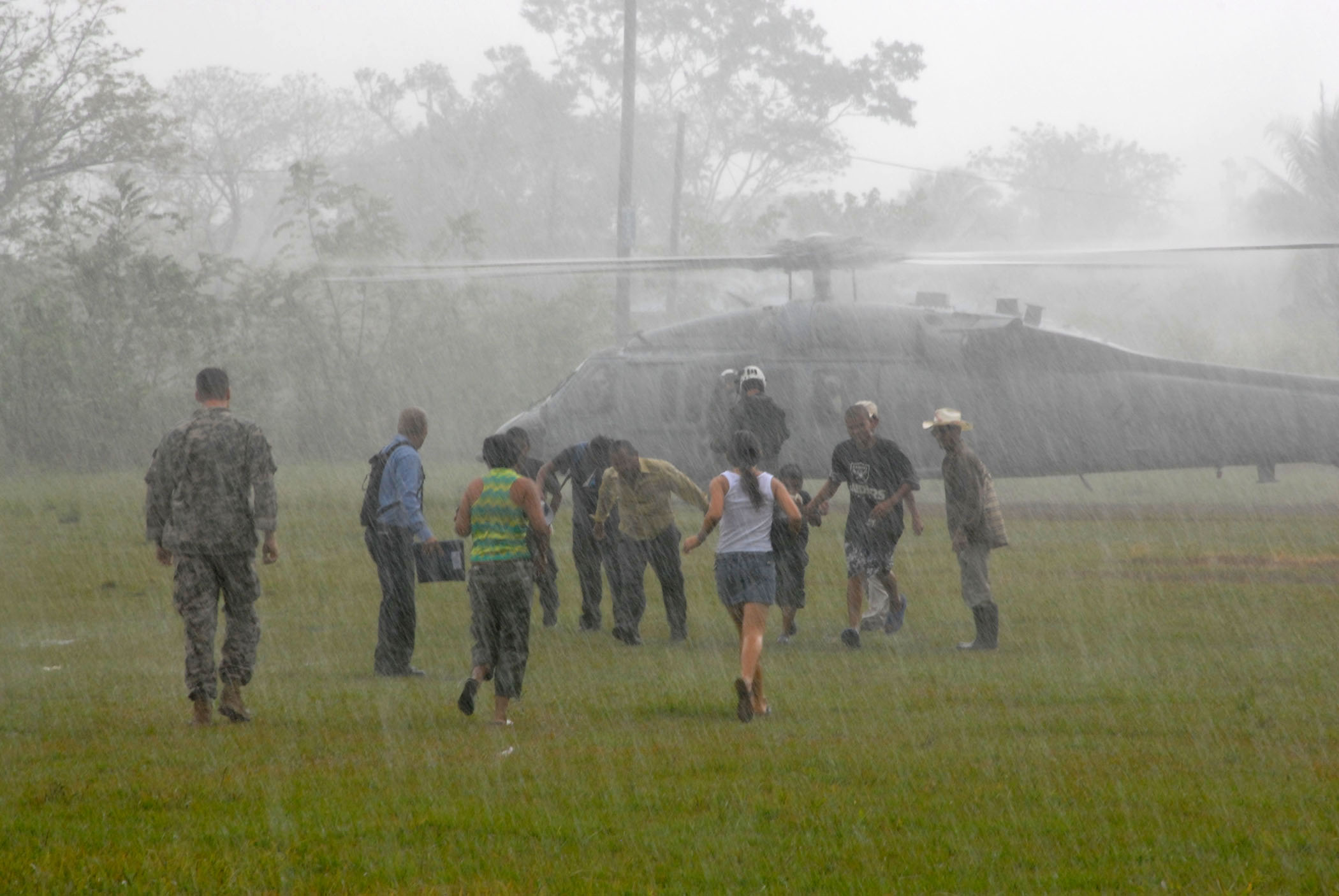

Valley of Peace (Valle de Paz in original Spanish) is a village in the Cayo District of Belize that was founded on March 12, 1982. In 2000 Valley of Peace had a population of 1,809 people. The population in 2007 grew to 2,108.

Valley of Peace was created as a refugee community for immigrants fleeing from the Salvadoran Civil War. Other Central American immigrants, joined the community during the same time. The United Nations High Commissioner for Refugees (UNHCR) implemented a project to assist the immigrants to find a peaceful and safe place to live. At that time, the Prime Minister of Belize was Rt. Hon. George Cadle Price. The project was taken to vote to the Senate and after debating, the majority voted in favor. It was agreed that for every three refugees families, one Belizean family was to be included in the project.

The funding for the project was paid for by UNHCR. They provided food supplies to each family for four months, while they settled. Most of the refugees were peasant farmers, so each family was given one acre of land to live in and fifty acres of land to farm. Throughout that time, the Mennonite Central Committee played a vital role in the survival of the village. They were responsible for taking food supplies to the refugees and distributing them evenly. They also provided the village with water that was transported from the river in a water truck. UNHCR also provided zinc for the roofing and cement for the floor of each house built in the community. By 1985, the villagers started a cooperative with 15 members which grew to 19 by the end of that year. It was the first local shop which provided the village with basic products. In 1992, Valley of Peace was officially registered as one of Belize's Villages. When the project initiated, life in the community was simple. It only had one primary school, so students wishing to further their education had to travel to a high school in Belmopan on a tractor-pulled cart. Now, Valley of Peace has a strong education base. It has two pre-schools, two primary schools and a high school. Students are now able to do their research in the local library or in an internet café.

Most of the men in the community still engage in peasant farming for food and income. Now, the community is a predominant supplier of fruits and vegetables to the Belmopan Market. However, a large part of the younger generation is moving away from farming. Many young people are now going to high school and university to become skilled in various areas. People in the village engage in various activities that keep them busy. For recreation, the village has a complete park with a playground. It also has three major churches which have many practicing members who engage in spiritual-related functions. In 2003, Valley of Peace was considered by the UNHCR as the largest refugee community in Belize.

== Demographics ==
At the time of the 2010 census, Valley of Peace had a population of 2,111. Of these, 81.7% were Mestizo, 14.2% Ketchi Maya, 2.4% Mixed, 0.7% Mopan Maya, 0.4% Creole, 0.2% Mennonite, 0.1% Asian and 0.1% Caucasian.
