= Francis Reneau =

Belizean pianist and composer

Francis Reneau (or Frankie Reneau) is a pianist and composer from Belize. In 1994 he was commissioned by the government to produce a representative compilation of Belizean music, and in 2001 he was awarded an MBE for services to music. In 2007 Francis help create the celebration to the 25 years that Belize has had its independence, for which he was appointed an OBE.

He is probably Belize's most accomplished musician, especially in the classical genre. As a teenager he wrote, produced and staged a very successful musical "Mass in Blues". The subsequent recording was also very successful and is considered a collector's item. There is a plan to re-release on CD.

Several of the young high school singers and musicians who took part in that project went on to become successful in the industry in their own right. Hugh Fuller Jr. who was on the WAVE Radio in L.A. and is now on KJLH and sometimes on KCET Television sang in it. As did Nellie Castillo, Santino's sister who is also one of Belize's celebrated singers.
