= Guanacaste National Park (Belize) =

Protected area in Belize

- IUCN category II (national park)
- Location within Belize
- Location: Cayo District, Belize
- Nearest city: Belmopan, Belize
- Coordinates: 17.2644°N 88.786°W
- Area: 50 acres (20 ha)
- Established: 1973

Guanacaste National Park is a 50-acre (20 ha) park in central Belize. It is named after a huge guanacaste tree that escaped being logged because its trunk divided into three bases, reducing its value as timber.

Guanacaste National Park is located on the north side of the Western Highway just to the east of the Roaring Creek bridge - about 50 miles (80 km) west of Belize City, in the Cayo District of Belize. In 1973, it was established as a Crown Reserve but finally gained status as a national park in 1990. The park was later put under the responsibility of the Belize Audubon Society. The Guanacaste National Park is the most accessible park of the Belize Audubon Society-managed protected areas. Its proximity to Belize's major cities make it a popular family spot. Public transportation from any nearby city is available to the national park.

The park is open to the public only during the day. The Guanacaste National Park is open from 8 am until 4:30 pm. The admission fee is about $1 BZD (Belize Dollar) for citizens and $5 BZD for tourists. There is an educational center, a gift shop, and over two miles (3 km) of maintained trails. The park's workers recommend that visitors wear long-sleeved shirts, sturdy shoes and pants to avoid contact with poisonous plants.

Besides the famous guanacaste tree, this national park is also home to other tree species such as the rain tree, mamey sapote, Brazilian firetree, and Honduras mahogany, Belize's national tree. Belize's reputation for an extensive biodiversity is also evident in the park's wide range of animals that tourists are able to observe. These include the white-tailed deer, jaguarundi, kinkajou, nine-banded armadillo, among countless others. This park is also a favorite for birdwatching. There have been recorded over one hundred different bird species, including the Lesson's motmot and black-faced antthrush. Other birds seen at Guanacaste Park include the smoky-brown woodpecker, black-headed trogon, red-lored amazon, the magnolia warbler, belted kingfisher, and the bright-rumped attila.
