= Stanley Reneau =

Belizean footballer (born 1968)

Stanley Reneau (born February 5, 1968) is a Belizean former professional football goalkeeper. He played for Griga United based in Dangriga beginning in 2001. He retired on July 1, 2009.
