= Brukdown =

- Stylistic origins: Kaiso; call and response; burru; Kriol music; West African music
- Cultural origins: 19th century

Brukdown is a genre of Belizean music. Its best-known performer and innovator, Wilfred Peters is regarded as a Belizean national icon. The word brukdown may come from broken down calypso, referring to the similarities between brukdown and Trinidadian calypso music; the presence of large numbers of Jamaicans in Belize also led to an influence from mento music.

Brukdown's main purpose is to tell the story of the Belizean Creole people. A typical Brukdown song may reflect the journey of the African slaves to the mahogany slave camps of Belize, but the genre has been sustained by its usefulness in spreading the word of historical and current events to the large illiterate population of Belize.

Brukdown is a Kriol mixture of European harmonies (Accordion), African syncopated rhythms and call-and-response format and lyrical elements from the native peoples of the area. In its modern form, brukdown is rural folk music, associated especially with the logging towns of the Belizean interior. Traditional instruments include the banjo, guitar, drums, dingaling bell, accordion and a donkey's jawbone played by running a stick up and down the teeth, and also a grater. Brukdown remains a rural, rarely recorded genre. This genre of music has primarily African elements, while the only significant European element, is the Accordion.
