= Love Belize Television =

Television station in Belize

LOVE Television is a local cable-only television station broadcasting 24 hours a day from Belize City, Belize. It is a subsidiary of RSV Limited, and has been on since the late 1990s.

Manager of Love Television is Ms. Julia Carrillo

== Personalities of LOVE Television ==
- Rene Villanueva Sr. - Chief Executive Officer
- Rene Villanueva Jr. - General Manager
- Julia Carrillo - Executive Coordinator
- Ava Diaz - Director of News & Current Affairs
- Sharmane Garbutt Garcia - Producer
- Matthew Villanueva - Videographer
- Olynn Kingston -Videographer
- Marion Ali - Reporter
- Natalie Novelo - Reporter
- Hipolito Novelo - Reporter
- Paul Mahung - Punta Gorda correspondent
- Harry Arzu - Dangriga correspondent
- Elaine Berry - San Ignacio and Western Cayo correspondent
- Eufemio "Fem" Cruz - Belmopan and Eastern Cayo correspondent

== See also ==
- Love FM – related radio station
