= Belize Elections and Boundaries Commission =

The Belize Elections and Boundaries Commission (EBC) is the primary electoral body in Belize. It supervises all local and national elections. The commission also establishes the boundaries of Belize's electoral divisions.

== Formation and duties ==
The EBC was formed in 1978 to oversee Belizean elections according to the Representation of the People Act. This Act became part of the Belize Constitution in 1981. The commission maintains a database of Belizean voters and periodically informs the nation on the state of the voter's list. It also occasionally makes proposals to revise boundaries in order to maintain near equality in voting divisions. There are currently 31 electoral divisions in Belize.

The EBC has a chairman and four other persons on its board. The chairman and two members are appointed by the governor-general on the advice of the prime minister after consultation with the leader of the opposition; the remaining members are appointed similarly, with the concurrence of the leader of the opposition. Members of the EBC serve for five-year terms. The Chairman is paid $2000 monthly, and each other member is paid $500 monthly.

The Elections and Boundaries Commission also acts as an international observer for other elections in the region, including in Venezuela.

== Delegation of duties ==
According to the Belize Constitution, the EBC delegates its responsibilities to the chief elections officer, who is not a member of the commission, and is officially in charge of voter registration, conduct of elections, and voter education.

== Members of the EBC ==
=== 2003 appointments ===
- Chairman: Karl H. Menzies
- Samira Musa Pott (prime ministerial appointee)
- Derek Courtenay (prime ministerial appointee)
- Dean Lindo (opposition appointee)
- Alberto August (opposition appointee)

=== 2012 appointments ===
- Chairman: B.Q. Pitts Sr

=== 2013 appointments ===
- Phillipa Griffith Bailey (prime ministerial appointee)
- Naima Barrow (prime ministerial appointee)
- Derek Courtenay (opposition appointee)
- Orlando Habe (opposition appointee)

=== 2016 appointments ===
- Chairman: Doug Singh

=== 2021 appointments ===
- Chairman: Oscar Sabido
- Chairman: Estevan Perera (resigned)
- Orlando Espat (prime ministerial appointee)
- Conrad Lewis (prime ministerial appointee)
- Phillipa Griffith Bailey (opposition appointee)
- Alberto August (opposition appointee)

== See also ==
- Elections in Belize
- Elections and Boundaries Department
