= Great Belize Productions =

Belize-based local production company

Great Belize Productions is a Belize-based local production company and the parent company of Greater Belize Media (Channel 5).

== Founding ==
The company was formed in 1982 as a video making company specialising in commercials for Belize's then-small television industry. It had a hand in the creation of several 1980s and 1990s motion pictures, including "Dogs of War" (1980), "The Mosquito Coast" (1986), "Caribe" (1987) and "Heart of Darkness" (1993).

Among the early proprietors of GBP was the late Emory King.

Great Belize Productions' first successful television series actually predates Channel 5. "Belize All Over", premiering in the late 1980s, featured stories on Belize told by local Belizean personalities. Clips from the show are still shown on Channel 5, particularly in the newscast.

In 1991, Great Belize received a license to broadcast on local television. Channel 5 began in December of that year and is Belize's most popular television station. With the rise of Channel 5, GBP has largely abandoned video production for outside sources, choosing instead to focus on building Channel 5 presentations.

== Sale to Telemedia ==
On June 16, 2008 it was announced that Belize Telemedia had acquired Great Belize Productions. Telemedia is rumored to still be majority-owned by Lord Michael Ashcroft, a fact which rankled many Belizeans. Former PUP figure and government official Amalia Mai is the company's new CEO.

Amandala columnist Frankie Rhys announced shortly after the sale that he would stop watching Channel 5 in protest; KREM's Evan Mose Hyde has since frequently called GBP's Channel 5 "Ashcroft TV" in protest of the sale. For more, see Greater Belize Media.
