= Corozal Junior College =

College in Belize

Coordinates: 18.39505°N 88.40335°W

- Other names: CJC
- Type: University
- Established: 1986
- Location: Joseito Layout, Corozal, Belize
- Mascot: Falcon
- Website: www.cjc.edu.bz

Corozal Junior College is a college in Corozal Town, Belize. It was established in 1986.
