= San José, Belize =

San José
- Town
- Location within Belize
- Coordinates: 18°10′N 88°34′W
- Country: Belize
- District: Orange Walk District
- San José: 1915

Government
  - Chairman: Rodolfo Rodriguez

Population (2010)
  - Total: 2,862
- Time zone: UTC-6 (Central)

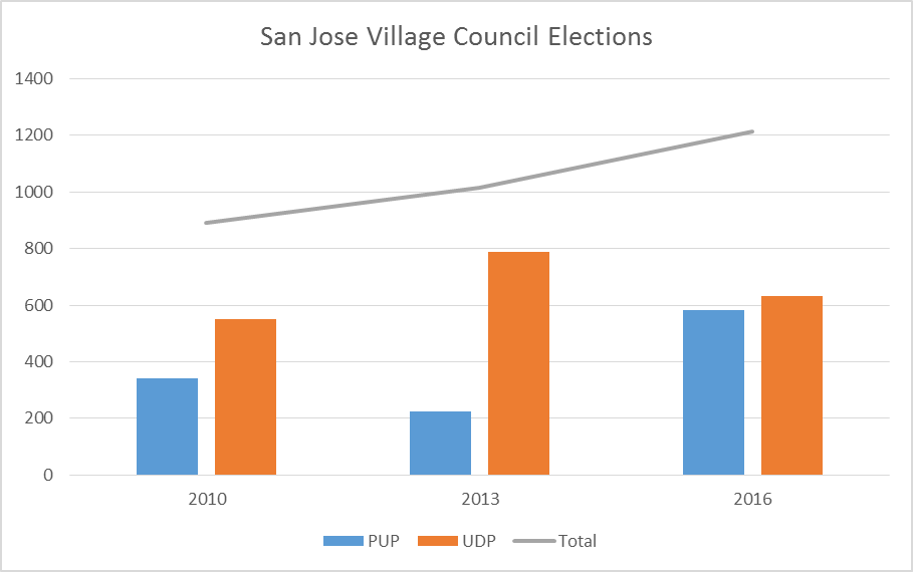
Village Council election results in San Jose for 2010, 2013 and 2016.

San José is a village in the Orange Walk District of Belize. In the 2000 census, San José had a population of 2,254 people. The village is the fourth largest in the Orange Walk district and is estimated to have almost 3,000 residents as of 2016 mainly of Yucatec Maya-Mestizo ancestry. San José is adjacent to San Pablo and is only divided from the latter by a speed bump. Combined, the two villages make up the third largest population center in the Orange Walk District with approximately 4,000 residents.

== Ethnicities ==
The community is populated by Maya Mestizos (Yucatec Mayas), Chinese, Taiwanese, and other people from Central America. It is heavily influenced by Catholicism.

== Population and Housing ==
2010 Population and Housing Census has San José's total population as 2,862 residents, of this 1,468 are males and 1,376 are females. The total number of households is 590 and the average household size is 4.9.

== Educational institutions ==
San José only has one elementary school which is San José Government School. Children also attend school in neighbouring San Pablo at San Pablo Roman Catholic School and San Pablo Community School.

== Transportation ==
The locality is served by the local bus company Cabrera's Bus Service. Local bus service to and from Orange Walk and Belize City to the south and Corozal Town to the north operates approximately every half-hour.

== Language ==
Most of the villagers of San Jose speak Spanish inside the village but they also understand English. Many of the elders continue speaking Yucatec Maya.
