= Centro Escolar Mexico Junior College =

College in Belize

Coordinates: 18.3048°N 88.5087°W

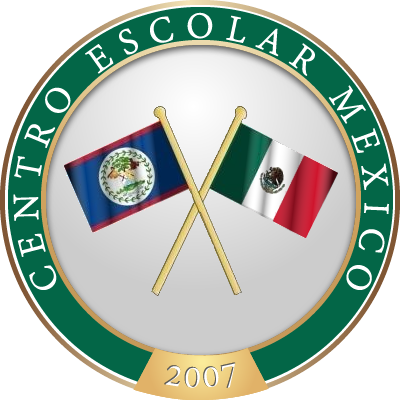
- Motto: "Creating more access for higher education"
- Type: Tertiary Level
- Established: 2007; 19 years ago
- Dean: Hugo Gonzalez
- Location: San Roman, Corozal, Belize
- Colors: Green, white red
- Nickname: CEMJC "Stallions"
- Website: www.cemjc.edu.bz

Centro Escolar Mexico Junior College is a tertiary level institution in San Roman Village in the Corozal District of Belize. It was funded by the Mexican government in 2007. This junior college functions mainly as a vocational institution. The programs of study include tourism, agriculture, information technology, mathematics, biology natural resource management, and architecture.

== Programs ==
This vocational technical college teaches their students the theory part of the courses and the practical part where they engage in fun and exciting activities.

=== Agriculture ===
The agriculture students are involved in chicken rearing and crop production. Some years ago this program did beekeeping and extracted honey from their bees, which were kept in the Ecological Park.

The Ecological Park is a secondary forest adjacent to the Junior College; it protects the organisms that live in there. The ecological park is shared with Escuela Secundaria Tecnica Mexico, the high school that is next to the Junior College. Students from E.S.T.M. also take care of the ecological park by cleaning the trails; they engage in a program with a butterfly sanctuary. The sanctuary is in one part of the ecological park.

=== Biology Natural Resource Management ===
For the Biology Natural Resource Management program, every year the group works with organizations such as the Belize Audubon Society and Blue Ventures where they perform research data collection in marine studies in places like the Bacalar Chico Marine Reserve, Halfmoon Caye, and Calabash Caye. At the end of the year they present their data to the head of their department with members of the organizations.

=== Tourism ===
The Tourism students partake in a wedding ceremony re-enactment as part of their curricular activities. They are exposed to this experience and do actual tour guiding of Mayan sites.

=== Information technology ===
The IT students get the opportunity to compete abroad with Central American countries, in fields such as programming and web design. Moreover, they learn the basic skills for them to properly maintain a personal computer and troubleshoot it.

=== Architecture ===
Architecture is one of the newest yet most interesting subjects in CEMJC. They are equipped with spacious classrooms, drafting tables, and specialized program named AutoCAD. As all other courses, Architecture students get the opportunity to create sophisticated models (houses, hotels, bridges among other complex structures).

=== Mathematics ===
The mathematics group is normally small — mostly made up of five students. This course is difficult; therefore, not many students enroll. The mathematics students have the opportunity to share their knowledge with the adjacent high school, as they are invited to teach for a day.

== In local culture ==
This institution is new to the Corozal District; however, they have the intention of expanding. Their aim is to hire more teachers and add more courses. The institution counts with a storeroom for the agriculture department, a lab for the biology department, two labs for the IT, a food and beverage kitchen for the tourism department, and a conference room — along with the expansion of the staff room and the construction of the auditorium.

Every year Centro Escolar Mexico Junior College holds their open day when every program displays the skills and apply the knowledge they gain in theory. This they put it into practice and students, teachers, parents, siblings and organizations go to see the activities and projects Centro's students have to display.
