= Elections and Boundaries Department =

The Belize Elections and Boundaries Department is the hands-on administrator of Belizean electoral politics. It was established in 1989 as a subordinate to the Elections and Boundaries Commission.

== Mission statement ==
As articulated by the EBD itself: "The Elections and Boundaries Department is committed to the enhancement of democracy through the promotion of voter education and the maintenance of a legitimate, impartial, valid electoral process."

== Establishment of the EBD ==
The EBD was established by an amendment to the Belize Constitution in 1988. The new amendment allowed the EBD's parent body, the EBC, to confer on it its powers in the Constitution and the ROPA. Staffing the department was delegated to the Public Services Commission, which nominated all persons in the department including, after a further amendment in 2001, the Chief Elections Officer.

The current chief elections officer is Josephine Tamai, who succeeded Dorothy Bradley.

== Functions of the EBD ==
The functions of the department are grouped into three categories: Electoral Administration, Adjustment of Electoral Records, and Voter Education. Under these are the following:

- Organising and directing the registration of voters
- Compiling electoral registers
- Updating and maintaining electoral records
- Organising the conduct of elections
- Preside over the orderly transfer of Electors
- To operate a professional electoral service
- To strengthen public confidence in the electoral system
- To increase the level of voter participation through voter education

== Organisation ==
The EBD's central office is located in Belize City, the municipality with the largest concentration of voters in the country, at P.O. Box 913, Mahogany Street Extension. Other offices include:

- Belize District offices:
  - Sub-Office: San Pedro Ambergris Caye (Belize Rural South only)
  - Belize Rural North, Central, South, Caribbean Shores, Pickstock, Fort George, Freetown: #92 North Front and Victoria Streets, Belize City
  - Collet, Mesopotamia, Lake Independence: Cemetery Road, Belize City (as of May 2007)
  - Albert, Queen's Square, Port Loyola: #89 Euphrates Avenue, Belize City
- Corozal District (Corozal North, Bay, Southeast and Southwest): #37 Second Street North (Lower Flat), Corozal Town
- Orange Walk District (Orange Walk East, South, Central and North Electoral Divisions) : #1A Santa Maria Street, Orange Walk Town
- Cayo District:
  - Cayo North, Central, Northeast: 28 West Street, San Ignacio Town
  - Cayo South and Belmopan: Market Square, City of Belmopan
  - Cayo West Sub-Office: Benque Viejo del Carmen Post Office (Every second Thursday each month)
- Stann Creek District (Dangriga and Stann Creek West):#16 Tubroose Street, Dangriga
- Toledo District (Toledo East and West): #41 Prince Street, Punta Gorda Town
  - Sub-Office: #135 Fadden Avenue, Independence Village, Stann Creek District

The offices are staffed with Registering Officers, Assistant Registering Officers, and Data Clerks to take care of the process of registering to vote.
