= VPL-FM =

Radio station in Belize City

LOVE FM (VPL-FM)
- Belize City; Belize
- Broadcast area: National
- Frequency: 95.1 MHz
- Branding: "LOVE FM"

Programming
- Format: Oldies

Ownership
- Owner: RSV Media Center
- Sister stations: MORE FM, Estereo Amor

History
- First air date: February 14, 1993; 33 years ago

Technical information
- Repeaters: 88.1 MHz Punta Gorda; 88.9 MHz Caye Caulker; 88.9 MHz Ladyville; 95.1 MHz Benque Viejo del Carmen; 98.1 MHz Dangriga; 98.1 MHz Orange Walk; 98.1 MHz San Pedro; 98.5 MHz Independence; 98.5 MHz Placencia; 98.5 MHz San Ignacio; 99.5 MHz Orange Walk

Links
- Website: LOVE FM website

LOVE FM is a radio station based in Belize City, operating since February 14, 1993. It is part of RSV Media Center, whose chairman is Dr. Rene Villanueva, Sr.

It broadcasts family-oriented programs and mature, contemporary style music.

== History ==
Love FM was the first private radio station to cover the entire nation of Belize.

== See also ==
- Love Belize Television – related TV station
