= VPV-FM =

Radio station in Belize

Positive Vibes FM (call-sign VPV-FM) is a private radio station in Belize and the radio arm of the Opposition People's United Party.

== History ==
Positive Vibes FM originally started as FM 2000 in 1994, owned by Gerald Garbutt. Its primary signal was 90.5 FM and secondary signal 102.9 FM.

FM 2000, advertised as the "21st century radio station", began operations on November 24, 1994, on Coney Drive in Belize City, upstairs of the Body 2000 gym. It focused mostly on the urban demographic with modern music including rap, hip hop and reggae, mixed with other contemporary music. Among its most popular DJs were media veterans Adrian Harris, Mike Nicholson, Ed Yorke and G. Michael Reid. Later popular DJs included Karil Wallace. All of the above had left FM 2000 by 2005.

FM 2000's popularity was somewhat low for much of its time on the air; it frequently trailed KREM and LOVE FM in listenership.

FM 2000 officially closed shop on November 5, 2006, when it was bought by the People's United Party and turned into a station called Positive Vibes FM, on the same signals as the original FM 2000 and run by PUP public relations veteran Vaughan Gill. It began broadcasting on November 13, 2006.

From June 18 to August 31, 2007 and from September 18, 2007, until the end of 2007, Great Belize Television Channel 5 broadcast the Morning Show from 7 to 9 AM.

== Programs ==
- The Whip (Talk show hosted by Vaughan Gill)
- Morning Show featuring Glenn Tillett
- Rural Talk (Sunday show hosted by Elston Wade)
