= San Pedro Junior College =

Public university in Belize

- Motto: Anchor In Success
- Type: Public
- Established: 2000
- Location: San Pedro Town, Belize
- Nickname: SPJC
- Website: spjc.edu.bz

San Pedro Junior College is a public university in San Pedro Town. In 2022, the college signed an agreement with police to offer scholarships to officers. In 2024, the graduating class had 54 students. A bachelor program was established also in 2024.
