= University of Belize =

National university of Belize

- Other name: UB
- Motto: Education Empowers A Nation
- Type: National University
- Established: 1 August 2000
- Chairman: Godfrey P. Smith
- President: Dr. Vincent Palacio
- Provost: Mariot Simon
- Faculty: 400
- Undergraduates: about 4,000
- Location: Belmopan, Belize; 17°14′37.10″N 88°45′36.55″W
- Campus: * Central Campus: Urban; West Landivar Campuses: Urban; Freetown Campus: Urban; Punta Gorda Town Campus: Rural
- Colors: Purple and gold
- Sporting affiliations: Association of Tertiary Level Institutions of Belize (ATLIB)
- Mascot: The Black Jaguar
- Website: www.ub.edu.bz

The University of Belize (UB) is an English-speaking multi-locational institute for higher education, and the national university of Belize. The institution offers certificates, diplomas, associate degrees, bachelor's degrees, and a graduate degree. The UB Central Campus is in Belmopan City.

The university's colors are purple and gold; its mascot is the "Black Jaguar" and its motto is "Education Empowers a Nation".

== History ==
The evolution of the Belizean university can be traced over a 22-year period beginning in 1977 with the establishment of the Committee for Sixth Form Studies in response to emerging concerns regarding the relevance of existing tertiary education, and ending in the year 2000 with a second attempt to coordinate and rationalize Belizean higher or tertiary education. During this time, the evolution of the university resulted in the establishment of three institutions: the Belize College of Arts, Sciences and Technology, the University College of Belize, and the University of Belize.

=== Previous attempts at national universities ===
Belizean nationalists long wished to decolonize the educational system and rely less on foreign academic institutions. In 1979 the ruling People's United Party (PUP) established the Belize College of Arts, Science, and Technology (BELCAST) as a state institution free of church involvement. The government secured funds from the European Economic Community for construction of a campus in Belmopan, but the campus was never built. On 24 February 1986, it was announced at a meeting of the National Council on Education that BELCAST would be closed. The rival United Democratic Party assumed power in December 1984 and later established an alternative college—the University College of Belize—in July 1986, created and maintained by Ferris State College of Big Rapids, Michigan. Nationalists were dismayed that the new University College of Belize would be administered by non-Belizeans. Intense political controversy arose in 1991 when it was discovered that the university had not been properly accredited, calling into question the value of its degrees. A new PUP government severed its agreement with Ferris State College, and the state of Belize assumed full control over the university.

=== Amalgamation ===
The University of Belize was established in August 2000 as an amalgamation of five tertiary-level institutions: Bliss School of Nursing, Belize Technical College, Belize Teachers' College, University College of Belize, and Belize School of Agriculture. Except for the last one, all institutions forming UB were located in Belize City; UCB had established a college affiliate in Belmopan.

== Campuses ==
Many of the campuses functional today were once their own individual schools until their merger into today's University of Belize.

=== Central Campus, Belmopan ===
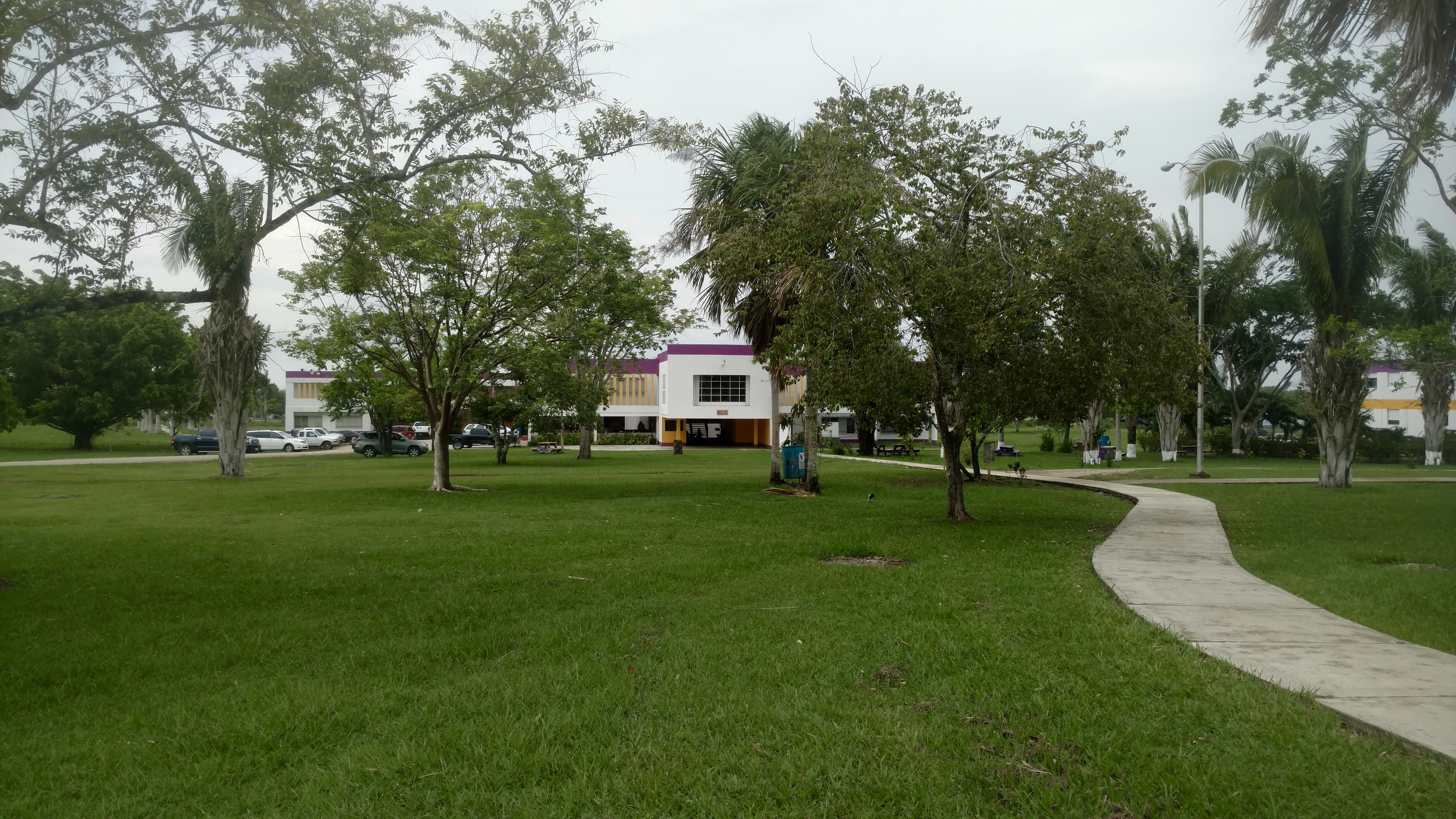
University of Belize, Central Campus.

Located at Hummingbird Avenue and University Drive in Belmopan, Central Campus is where most programs and the university's administrative offices are located. It is the location of the Information Technology Department, the science labs, and the Regional Language Center, where students from Latin American countries learn English.

=== Central Farm (Agriculture Campus) ===
The Central Farm is the location of the Department of Agriculture. It is located in Central Farm, Cayo, on the George Price Highway in the Cayo District. It is the former site of the Belize School of Agriculture, which offered two-year programs in Applied Sciences/Agriculture and Natural Resources.

=== Belize City Campuses ===
The Management and Social Sciences Campus is the location of the business programs and the Belize City administrative offices for UB. It is located at Graduate Crescent and College Street in West Landivar, Belize City. It is the former site of University College of Belize (UCB).

=== Education and Arts Campus ===
The Education and Arts Campus is where the faculties of Education and Arts and Nursing, Allied Health, and Social Work are located. It is located on University Drive in West Landivar, Belize City. It is the former site of Belize Teachers' College.

=== Science and Technology Campus ===
The Science and Technology Campus shares space with Belize District Institute of Vocational and Technical Education and Training (ITVET). It is located on Freetown Road in Belize City. It is the former site of Belize Technical College.

=== University of Belize, Punta Gorda Campus ===
The University of Belize, in collaboration with San Pedro Junior College, offers a B.Sc. in Tourism Management. Marine field stations: Hunting Caye and Calabash Caye field station.

== Admissions policy ==
Associate's: High School Diploma (minimum GPA 2.5 and 2.5 or above in English and Math). Four passes in CXC subjects, which must include English and Mathematics. ATLIB English and Math general test pass, or combined score of 890 on the SAT or 18 on the ACT.

Bachelor's: Associate Degree from recognized institutions, scores same as above. Transfer credits allowed for courses graded C+ or higher. Credit transferability is subject to the university's criteria.

Diploma: Bachelor's Degree from a recognized institution.

== Divisions of study ==
The university has four main faculties, each with departments. Each department offers degrees from associate degrees (1st undergraduate degree) to bachelor's degrees (undergraduate degree). The master's degree (graduate) program in Biodiversity Conservation & Sustainable Development is offered in partnership with the University of the West Indies, Saint Augustine, Trinidad and Tobago, the University of Guyana and Anton de Kom University of Suriname.

Education and Arts

- The Regional Language Center
- Department of Arts
- Department of Education
- History & Anthropology Center

Management and Social Sciences

- Department of Business and Accounting
- Department of Social Sciences

Science and Technology

- Department of Agriculture
- Department of Engineering
- Department of Information Technology
- Department of Science

Nursing, Allied Health, and Social Work

- Department of Allied Health
- Department of Nursing
- Department of Social Work

Students are able to get hands-on experience in the field of Biology, Zoology, Marine Biology, Anthropology and Archeology (among others) at the university's field stations.

== Environmental Research Institute ==
The logo of the Environmental Research Institute

The Environmental Research Institute (ERI), the newest department of the university, was inaugurated in January 2010. Belize has a wealth of natural resources, including the longest barrier reef in the Western Hemisphere, which supports the country's most important industries, including tourism and agriculture. Recognizing this, the work of the ERI is focused on producing results that are relevant to the sustainable management of Belize's natural resources.

== Energy ==
A solar photovoltaic system owned by the University of Belize provides 0.1% of the nation's supply of electricity.

== Athletics ==
The university is affiliated with the Association of Tertiary Level Institutions of Belize (ATLIB) and participates in that organization's sporting tournaments.

The university men's basketball team is known as the Black Jaguars. The team has participated in local and international tournaments for several years, and it was the former national semi-professional champion in the local tournament.

The university participates annually in the Ruta Maya River Challenge, a four-day race. Local and foreign individuals participate in the Ruta Maya River Challenge.

The university organizes intramural activities in volleyball, football, softball, basketball, canoeing, karate, tennis, and aerobics.

Students may contact the Coordinator of Recreation and Sport on the Central Campus or the Coordinators of Student Affairs on the other campuses for details on participating in university sports.

== Miscellaneous ==
- The university has international programs with 45 other institutions.
- Students can live off and on-campus.
- There is Writing Center on the central campus. It assists students in developing their writing skills.
