= Outline of Belize =

Country in Central America

The Flag of Belize

The Coat of arms of Belize

The location of Belize

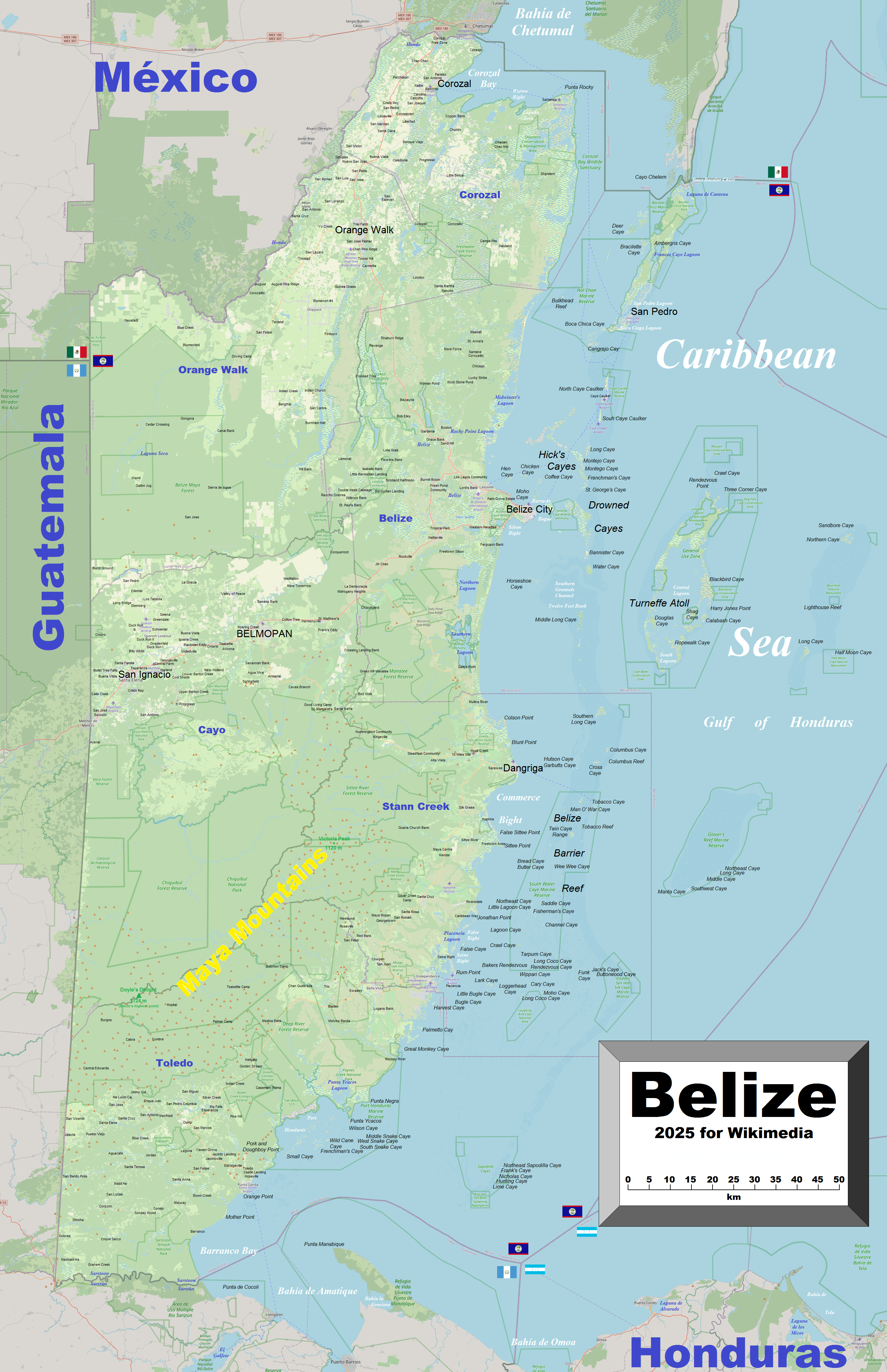
An enlargeable map of Belize

The following outline is provided as an overview of and introduction to Belize:

Belize – country located on the north-eastern coast of Central America and the only country in the area where English is the official language, although Kriol and Spanish are widely spoken. Belize has a diverse society, comprising many cultures and languages, and is the only nation in the region with a British colonial heritage as part of the Commonwealth Caribbean, though it also shares a common heritage with the Caribbean portions of other Central American countries.

== General reference ==
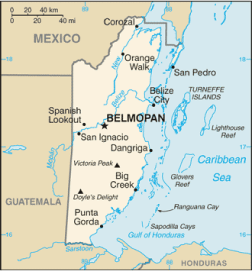
A basic map of Belize

- Pronunciation: /bəˈliːz/
- Common name in English: Belize (etymology)
- Official name in English: Belize
- Common endonym(s): Belize
- Official endonym(s): Belize
- Demonym(s): Belizean
- International rankings
- ISO country codes: BZ, BLZ, 084
- ISO region codes: see ISO 3166-2:BZ
- Internet country code top-level domain: .bz

== Geography of Belize ==
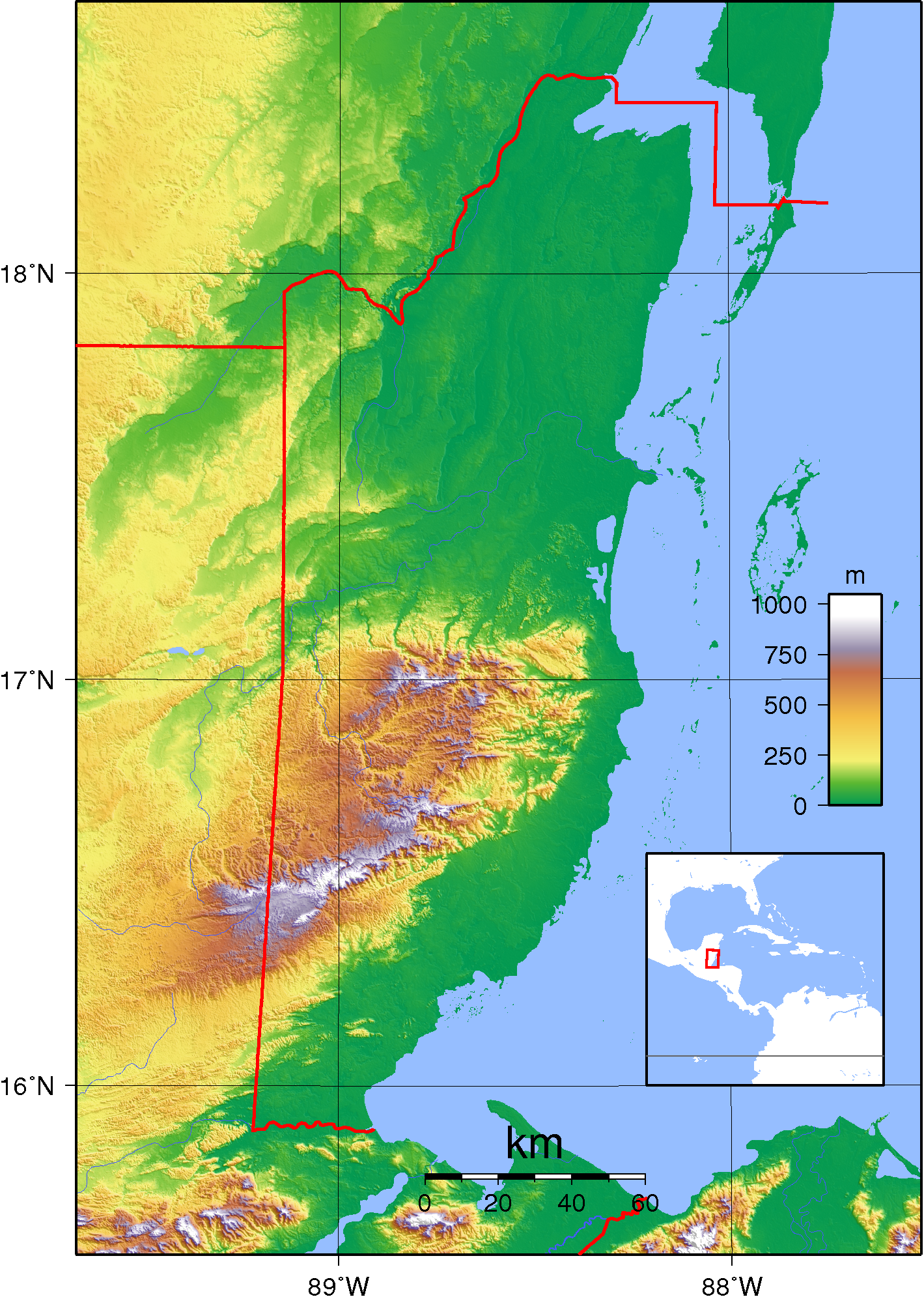
An enlargeable topographic map of Belize

Geography of Belize

- Belize is...
  - a country
    - a nation state
    - a Commonwealth realm
- Location:
  - Northern Hemisphere and Western Hemisphere
    - Americas
      - North America
        - Middle America
          - Central America
      - Western Caribbean Zone
  - Time zone: Central Standard Time (UTC-06)
  - Extreme points of Belize
    - High: Doyle's Delight 1,124 m (3,688 ft)
    - Low: Caribbean Sea 0 m
  - Land boundaries: 516 km

Guatemala 266 km
Mexico 250 km

- Coastline: 386 km

- Population of Belize: 301,270 (2008) - 174th most populous country
- Area of Belize: 22,966 square kilometres (8,867 sq mi) - 150th largest country
- Atlas of Belize

=== Environment of Belize ===
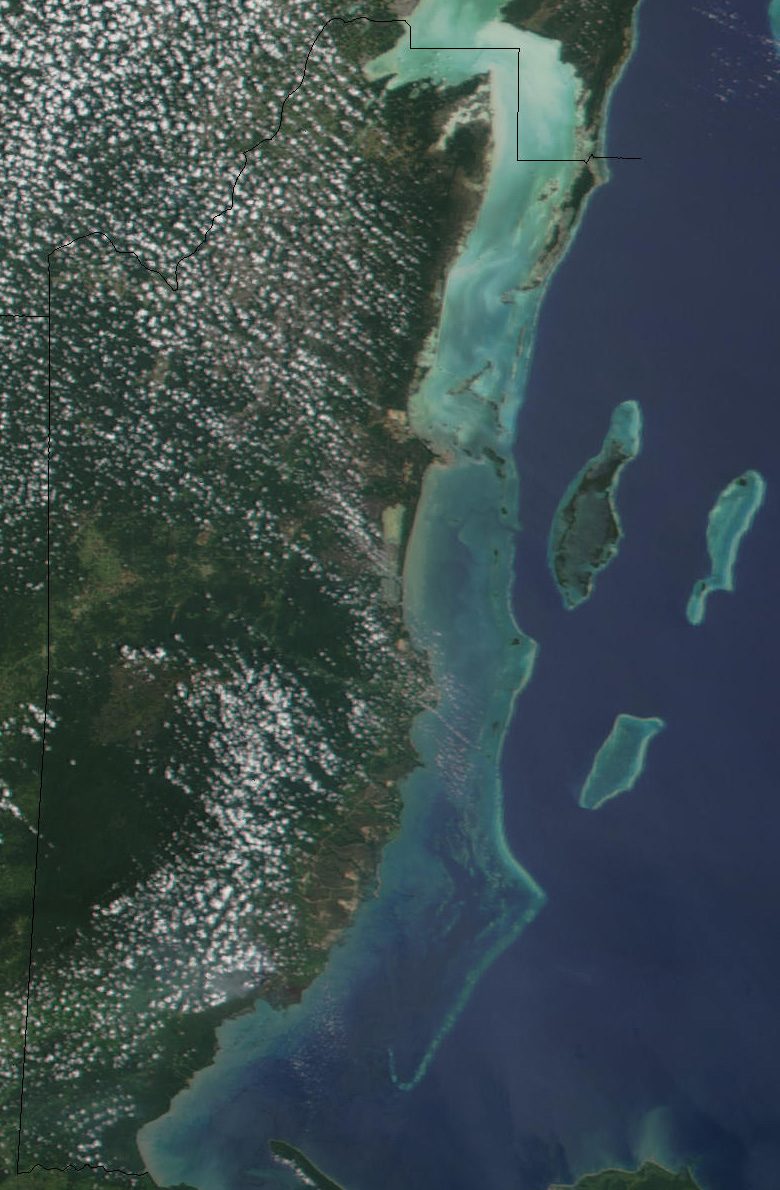
An enlargeable satellite image of Belize

- Climate of Belize
- Environmental issues in Belize
- Geology of Belize
- Protected areas of Belize
  - Biosphere reserves in Belize
  - National parks of Belize
- Renewable energy in Belize
- Wildlife of Belize
  - Fauna of Belize
    - Birds of Belize
    - Mammals of Belize
  - Flora of Belize

==== Natural geographic features of Belize ====
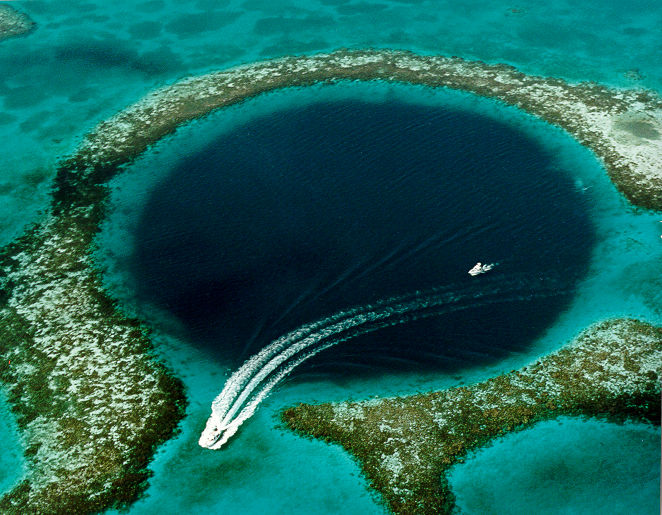
The Great Blue Hole, a giant submarine sinkhole near Belize City

- Atoll
- Barrier reef
- Fjords of Belize
- Glaciers of Belize
- Islands of Belize
- Lakes of Belize
- Mountains of Belize
  - Volcanoes in Belize
- Rivers of Belize
  - Waterfalls of Belize
- Submarine sinkhole
- Valleys of Belize
- World Heritage Sites in Belize

=== Regions of Belize ===
Regions of Belize

==== Ecoregions of Belize ====
List of ecoregions in Belize

==== Administrative divisions of Belize ====
Administrative divisions of Belize

- Districts of Belize
  - Constituencies of Belize

===== Districts of Belize =====
Districts of Belize

- Belize
- Cayo
- Corozal
- Orange Walk
- Stann Creek
- Toledo

===== Constituencies of Belize =====
The constituencies of Belize by District:

- Belize District:
  - Albert
  - Belize Rural Central
  - Belize Rural North
  - Belize Rural South
  - Caribbean Shores
  - Collet
  - Fort George
  - Freetown
  - Lake Independence
  - Mesopotamia
  - Pickstock
  - Port Loyola
  - Queen's Square
- Cayo District
  - Belmopan
  - Cayo Central
  - Cayo North
  - Cayo North East
  - Cayo South
  - Cayo West
- Corozal District
  - Corozal Bay
  - Corozal North
  - Corozal South East
  - Corozal South West
- Orange Walk District
  - Orange Walk Central
  - Orange Walk East
  - Orange Walk North
  - Orange Walk South
- Stann Creek District
  - Dangriga
  - Stann Creek West
- Toledo District
  - Toledo East
  - Toledo West

===== Municipalities of Belize =====
- Capital: Belmopan
- Cities: Cities of Belize

=== Demography of Belize ===
Demographics of Belize

== Government and politics of Belize ==
Politics of Belize

- Capital of Belize: Belmopan
- Elections in Belize
- Form of government: parliamentary representative democratic monarchy
- Political parties in Belize

=== Branches of government ===
Government of Belize

==== Executive branch of the government of Belize ====
- Cabinet of Belize
- Head of government: Prime Minister of Belize, Johnny Briceño
- Head of state: Monarch of Belize, Charles III
  - His Majesty's representative: Governor-General of Belize, Froyla Tzalam

==== Legislative branch of the government of Belize ====
- National Assembly of Belize (bicameral)
  - Upper house: Senate of Belize
  - Lower house: House of Representatives of Belize

==== Judicial branch of the government of Belize ====
Court system of Belize

- Judicial Committee of the Privy Council
  - Supreme Court of Belize
    - Magistrates' Court of Belize

=== Foreign relations of Belize ===
Foreign relations of Belize

- Diplomatic missions in Belize
- Diplomatic missions of Belize

==== International organization membership ====
Belize is a member of:

- African, Caribbean, and Pacific Group of States (ACP)
- Agency for the Prohibition of Nuclear Weapons in Latin America and the Caribbean (OPANAL)
- Caribbean Community and Common Market (Caricom)
- Caribbean Development Bank (CDB)
- Central American Integration System (SICA)
- Commonwealth of Nations
- Food and Agriculture Organization (FAO)
- Group of 77 (G77)
- Inter-American Development Bank (IADB)
- International Atomic Energy Agency (IAEA)
- International Bank for Reconstruction and Development (IBRD)
- International Civil Aviation Organization (ICAO)
- International Criminal Court (ICC)
- International Criminal Police Organization (Interpol)
- International Development Association (IDA)
- International Federation of Red Cross and Red Crescent Societies (IFRCS)
- International Finance Corporation (IFC)
- International Fund for Agricultural Development (IFAD)
- International Labour Organization (ILO)
- International Maritime Organization (IMO)
- International Monetary Fund (IMF)
- International Olympic Committee (IOC)
- International Organization for Migration (IOM)
- International Red Cross and Red Crescent Movement (ICRM)
- International Telecommunication Union (ITU)
- International Trade Union Confederation (ITUC)
- Latin American Economic System (LAES)
- Multilateral Investment Guarantee Agency (MIGA)
- Nonaligned Movement (NAM)
- Organisation for the Prohibition of Chemical Weapons (OPCW)
- Organization of American States (OAS)
- Permanent Court of Arbitration (PCA)
- Rio Group (RG)
- United Nations (UN)
- United Nations Conference on Trade and Development (UNCTAD)
- United Nations Educational, Scientific, and Cultural Organization (UNESCO)
- United Nations Industrial Development Organization (UNIDO)
- Universal Postal Union (UPU)
- World Confederation of Labour (WCL)
- World Customs Organization (WCO)
- World Federation of Trade Unions (WFTU)
- World Health Organization (WHO)
- World Intellectual Property Organization (WIPO)
- World Meteorological Organization (WMO)
- World Trade Organization (WTO)

=== Law and order in Belize ===
Law of Belize

- Constitution of Belize
- Crime in Belize
- Human rights in Belize
  - Freedom of religion in Belize
  - LGBT rights in Belize
- Law enforcement in Belize

=== Military of Belize ===
Military of Belize

- Command
  - Commander-in-chief
    - Ministry of Defence of Belize
- Forces
  - Air Force of Belize
  - Army of Belize
  - Navy of Belize
  - Special forces of Belize
- Military history of Belize
- Military ranks of Belize

=== Local government in Belize ===
Local government in Belize

== History of Belize ==
History of Belize

- Current events of Belize
- Military history of Belize
- Timeline of the history of Belize

== Culture of Belize ==
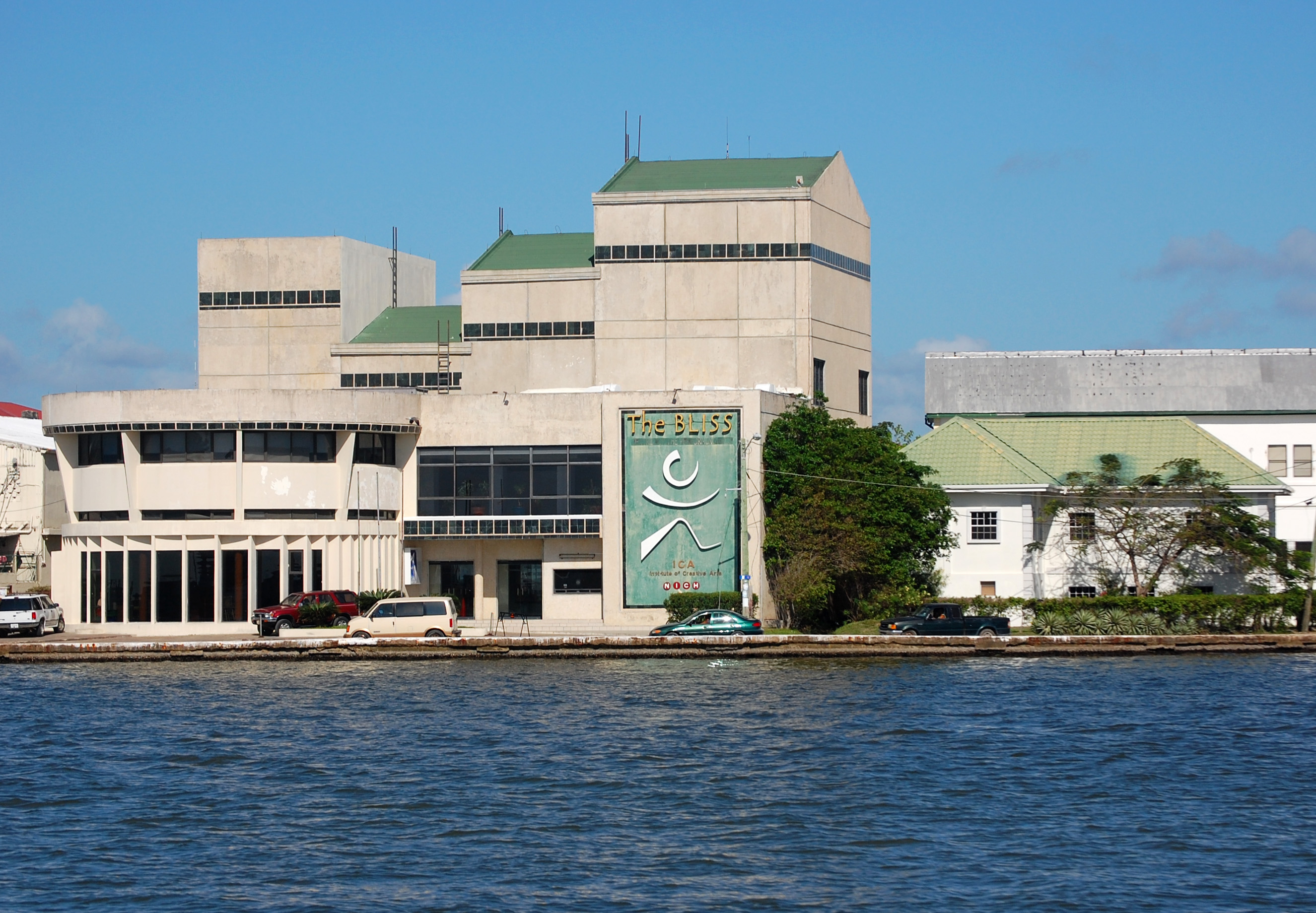
The Bliss Institute in Belize City after its remodelation in 2003

Culture of Belize

- Architecture of Belize
- Cuisine of Belize
- Festivals in Belize
- Languages of Belize
- Media in Belize
  - Newspapers
  - Radio stations
  - Television stations
- National symbols of Belize
  - Coat of arms of Belize
  - Flag of Belize
  - National Anthem: "Land of the Free"
- People of Belize
  - Belizean Creole people
- Prostitution in Belize
- Public holidays in Belize
- Records of Belize
- Religion in Belize
  - Buddhism in Belize
  - Christianity in Belize
    - Catholic Church in Belize
  - Hinduism in Belize
  - Islam in Belize
  - Judaism in Belize
  - Sikhism in Belize
- World Heritage Sites in Belize

=== Art in Belize ===
- Art in Belize
- Cinema of Belize
- Literature of Belize
- Music of Belize
- Theatre in Belize

=== Sports in Belize ===
Sports in Belize

- Belize at the Olympics
- Football in Belize

== Economy and infrastructure of Belize ==
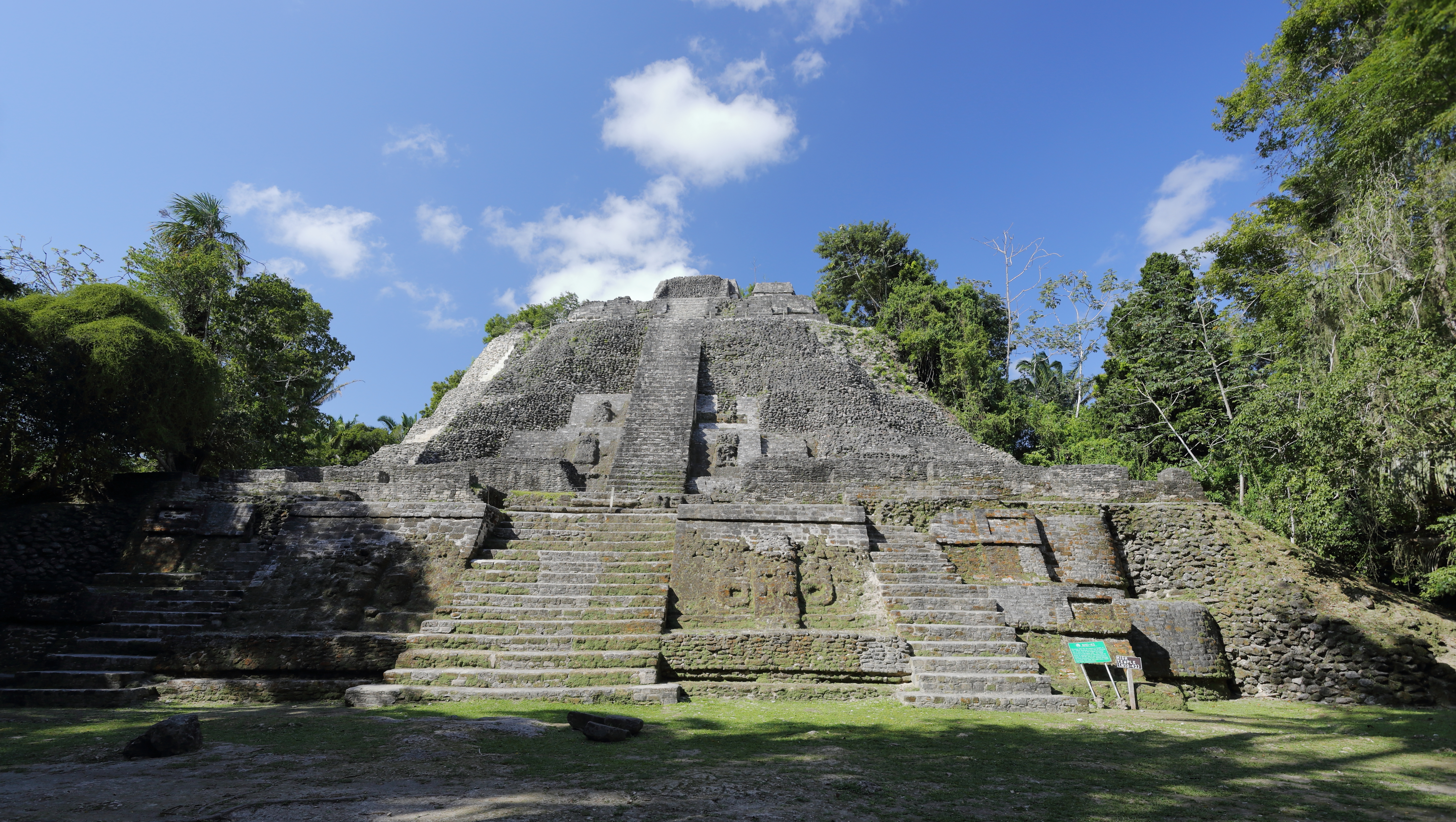
The High Temple of Lamanai

Economy of Belize

- Belize Stock Exchange
- Central Bank of Belize
- Communications in Belize
  - Internet in Belize
- Companies of Belize
- Currency of Belize: Dollar
  - ISO 4217: BZD
- Economic rank, by nominal GDP (2007): 163rd (one hundred and sixty third)
- Energy in Belize
- Tourism in Belize
  - Visa policy of Belize
- Transport in Belize
  - Airports in Belize
  - Ports of Belize
  - Rail transport in Belize
  - Roads in Belize

== Education in Belize ==
Education in Belize

- University of Belize

== Health ==
Healthcare in Belize

== See also ==
Belize

- Index of Belize-related articles
- List of Belize-related topics
- List of international rankings
- Member state of the Commonwealth of Nations
- Member state of the United Nations
- Outline of Central America
- Outline of geography
- Outline of North America
