= Belize–Colombia relations =

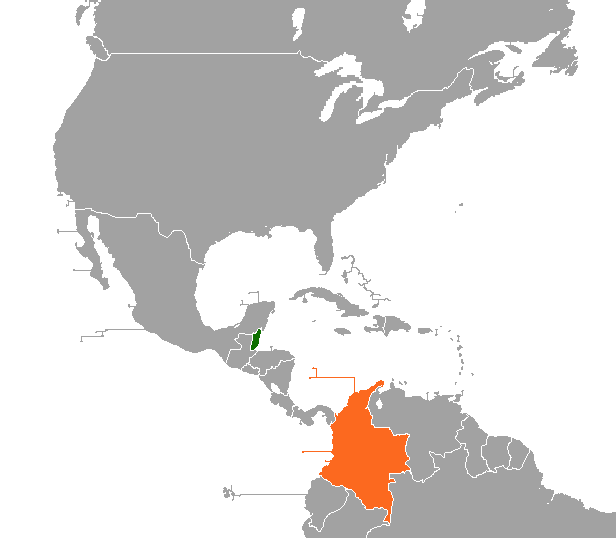

- Belize: Colombia

Diplomatic mission
- (Note: Concurrent Embassy.): Embassy of Colombia in San Salvador (El Salvador) (Note: Concurrent Embassy.)

Relations between Belize and the Republic of Colombia began on 15 February 1982, less than a year after the former's independence from the United Kingdom. But prior to that, Colombia had already signed treaties with the European country, in 1888 they signed an extradition treaty. In 1866 and in 1980 they exchanged to promote relations of friendship, trade and navigation. Both countries are members of the Organization of American States and Community of Latin American and Caribbean States.

== Significant issues ==
Belize is part of the cooperation projects within the framework of the Cooperation Strategy with the Caribbean Basin. Within this project, Belize has received cooperation in various aspects, such as:

- Public service: Colombia has trained in various aspects of public service, including quality management, audits, public water, sewerage and basic sanitation services (management and rates), and citizen service.
- Security: Colombia has trained the Belizean armed forces in maritime and air interdiction for the fight against drug trafficking, substance control in ports and airports, air defence, money laundering, violence prevention, criminal intelligence, police transparency, and drug supply.
- Social Security: The areas in which Belize has received assistance are: payment of subsidies, poverty reduction.
- Development: Second-tier banking, technological development and innovation, small and medium-sized enterprises, entrepreneurship and sustainable production models are the areas in which Belize has received technical advice from Colombia.

On the other hand, Colombia helps most of the Central American countries, along with Mexico through the Mesoamerica Project. Belize has benefited from infrastructure, tourism and environmental projects.

=== Dispute with Guatemala ===
At the 2012 meeting between the Foreign Ministers of Colombia and Guatemala, the Andean country congratulated the governments of Belize and Guatemala for bringing this dispute to a popular consulate. This demonstrates that Colombia applauds peaceful solutions to disputes and avoids taking sides in this conflict.

=== Drug trafficking ===
In 2011, Belize was placed on the United States' blacklist for drug trafficking, due to its location making it a corridor for drug transport to the United States and the insular Caribbean. Therefore, Belize, like Colombia, has strengthened its ties in the fight against the drug problem through multilateral forums, the main one being the OAS.

== Diplomatic missions ==
In 2002, Colombia decided to close its embassy in Belize, so all diplomatic matters from Colombia to the Central American country are handled through the diplomatic office in San Salvador. Likewise, Belize accredited its ambassador in Mexico City to the Colombian government.

== Trade ==
In 1994, CARICOM and Colombia signed a free trade agreement aimed at promoting trade and investment, cooperation and the creation of joint ventures.

Trade between Belize and Colombia
Country	Exports ($USD)	Percentage (exports)	Percentage (imports)	Percentage (total)	Products
Belize	$169.620	0.00249%	0.20559%	0.14336%	chemicals, toys, wood products, boilers, plastic products, electrical appliances.
Colombia	$1.800.903	0.00306%	0.00029%	0.00167%	chemicals, pharmaceuticals, boilers, foods, ceramics, organic chemicals.

Source: Trade Map

== Diplomatic missions ==
- Belize does not have an accreditation to Colombia.
- Colombia is accredited to Belize from its embassy in San Salvador, El Salvador and has an honorary consulate in Belmopan.

== See also ==
- Foreign relations of Belize
- Foreign relations of Colombia
