= Belize–Canada relations =

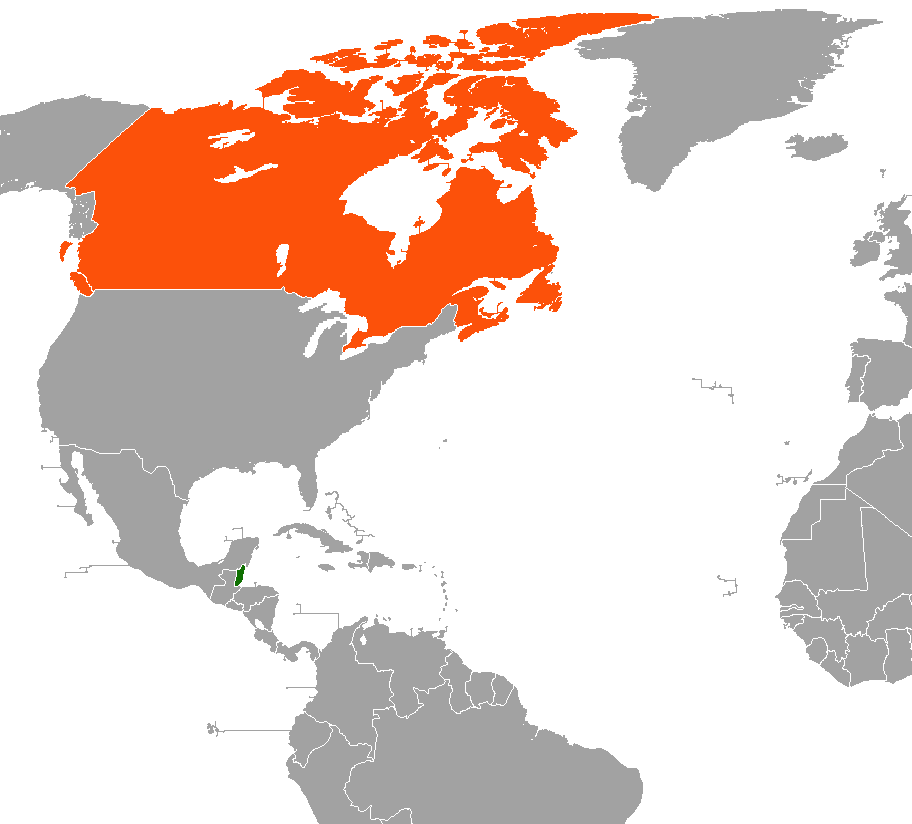

- Belize: Canada

The nations of Belize and Canada established diplomatic relations in 1981. Both nations are members of the Commonwealth of Nations, Organization of American States and the United Nations.

== History ==
In 1965, Canada appointed a commissioner to then British Honduras (present-day Belize). In September 1981 Belize obtained its independence from the United Kingdom. That same year in November, Canada recognized and established diplomatic relations with Belize. Canada first appointed a high commission to Belize with residency in Kingston, Jamaica before move accreditation to its embassy in Guatemala City. Since the establishment of diplomatic relations, relations between the two nations have been limited and have taken place mainly in multilateral forums.

In April 2001, Belizean Prime Minister Said Musa paid a visit to Quebec City to attend the 3rd Summit of the Americas. While in Canada, Prime Minister Musa met with Prime Minister Jean Chrétien.

In October 2012, Canadian Minister of State of Foreign Affairs, Diane Ablonczy, paid a visit to Belize and toured the Guatemala-Belize Adjacency Zone, a buffer region part of the terroritorail dispute between Belize and Guatemala. Minister Ablonczy also traveled to Spanish Lookout and met with members of Canadian Mennonites residing in Belize, whose number total 2,500.

Since 2015, the Canadian government has supported Belize with several security related projects by providing training to tackle illicit drugs, corruption, human trafficking, crime prevention (among others). In June 2022, Belizean Governor General Froyla Tzalam and Canadian Governor General Mary Simon held a bilateral meeting while in London attending the Platinum Jubilee for Queen Elizabeth II. In 2021, both nations held their first bilateral consultation meeting virtually. That same year, in November, both nations celebrated 40 years of diplomatic relations.

In October 2023, Belizean Prime Minister Johnny Briceño traveled to Ottawa to attend the Caribbean Community summit. While in Canada, Prime Minister Briceño met with Prime Minister Justin Trudeau.

Belize is home to over 13,000 Canadians.

== High-level visits ==
High-level visits from Belize to Canada

- Prime Minister Said Musa (2001)
- Prime Minister Johnny Briceño (2023)

High-level visits from Canada to Belize

- Minister of State of Foreign Affairs Diane Ablonczy (2012)

== Transportation ==
There are direct flights between both nations with Air Canada Rouge and WestJet.

== Bilateral agreements ==
Both nations have signed a few bilateral agreements such as a Trade and Economic Cooperation Agreement between Canada and Member States of the Caribbean Common Market (which includes Belize) (1979); and an Agreement for the Training in Canada of Personnel of the Armed Forces of Belize (1985).

== Diplomatic missions ==
- Belize is accredited to Canada from its embassy in Washington, D.C., United States and maintains honorary consulates in Calgary and in London, Ontario.
- Canada is accredited to Belize from its embassy in Guatemala City, Guatemala and maintains an honorary consulate in Belize City.

== See also ==
- Foreign relations of Belize
- Foreign relations of Canada
