= Belizean =

Belizean may refer to:

- Something of, or related to Belize, a Central American nation
- Belizean people, people originating in Belize whether they live there or in the Belizean diaspora
- Belizean population, see Demographics of Belize
- Belizean cuisine
- Belizean culture, see Culture of Belize
- Belizean society
