= Belize–Spain relations =

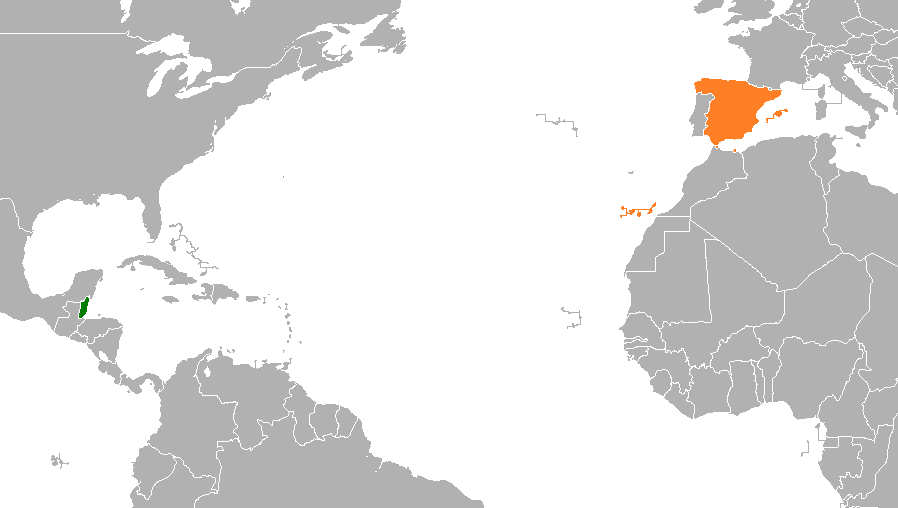

- Belize: Spain

The nations of Belize and Spain established diplomatic relations in 1989.

== Historical relations ==
In the year 1494, the Treaty of Tordesillas was signed, claiming that the entire west of New World was for Spain, including the current Belize. Later, in the mid-16th century, the Spanish conquerors explored that territory, declaring it a Spanish colony and being incorporated into the Captaincy General of Guatemala on December 27, 1527, when it was founded. In this way it is integrated, in the second half of that century, to the Government of Yucatan, in the Viceroyalty of New Spain. Thus, although in 1530 the conqueror Francisco de Montejo, after attacking the Nachankan Maya and Belize, failed in his attempt to subject the Maya to Spanish rule, The territory remained under Spanish power. Thus, it is in 1544 when the first written documents about the Spanish presence in Belize are registered. These first settlers settled in the Mayan city of Lamanai, a city in which a Spanish colonial church was built in 1570, being this city the one that absorbed major European influences in Belize. For their part, the first Spanish missionaries in Belize arrived in the territory in 1550 and evangelized the population of the Choles area (a linguistic group belonging to the ethnic group of K'ekchi), reaching the Bay of Amatique (in the current Province of the Verapaz, in the southern half of present-day Belize).

However, there were few Spaniards who settled there, due to the lack of resources for them important, such as gold, and the strong defense of the Mayan people in the Yucatán Peninsula. Thus, Spanish settlers residing in Belize frequently fought against the Maya, who, in addition, were affected by slavery and the diseases carried by the Spaniards.

However, after the mid-sixteenth century, there is little evidence of Spanish explorations in Belize, although not evangelization: in 1618 the Pucté region was evangelized, in the north of present-day Belize, and, in 1621, the region was of the Mopanes and Tipúes, in the central part of the territory.

The only exception of Spanish explorations in Belize after the mid-16th century is found on a trip made by a Dominican father, Fray José Delgado, in 1677. Delgado traveled throughout Belize towards the municipality of Bacalar, in the Mexican state Quintana Roo. However, he could not continue on his way because, before reaching the Mexican municipality, he was captured and stripped by some Englishmen in some area near the Texoc River - probably the current Mullins River.

On the other hand, between 1638 and 1695, the Mayans residing in Tipu enjoyed autonomy from Spanish rule. But in 1696, Spanish soldiers used Tipu as a base from which the area would be pacified and missionary activities would be supported. In 1697 the Spaniards conquered Itzá, and in 1707, the Spaniards forcibly resettled the inhabitants of Tipu in an area close to Lake Petén Itzá.

In 1717, after the British settlement in Belize between the 16th and 17th centuries and in order to remove foreigners from the area, the army led by Marshal Antonio Figueroa and Silva Lazo, governor of the Yucatan Peninsula, expelled the English of Rio Belize. Even so, over time, the British ended up returning, so this expedition developed a series of Spanish raids to expel them at various times.

Later, on January 20, 1783, Great Britain and Spain signed the peace and shortly thereafter signed the Treaty of Versailles, in which Spain ceded to Britain a small part of the current Belize, about 1,482 km- or 4,804-, located between the rivers Hondo and Belize. In addition, due to the request of British settlers to obtain more territory to have a greater area of action, since the territory assigned to them was very limited, the Convention of London of 1786 by which Spain gave him another 1,883 km of Belize (reaching the Sibún River or Laguna Manate, south of Belize River).

However, sometime between 1786 and 1796, a Spanish official who visited the Yucatan to report on Baymen's activities indicated that the Baymen were dangerously expanding their borders to cut the dye stick also in Campeche, near a city of Spanish population. Therefore, Spain issued orders for the immediate and effective expulsion of settlers who occupied Belize. This triggered a war between Great Britain and Spain on the coast of Belize in September 1798, a war that was called The Battle of St. George's Cay and ended with the Spanish defeat. Because of that, the British were able to stay in Belizean territory - and throughout the continental part of Central America-, being able to freely exercise their dominance in the area, although the territory remained, officially, Spanish.

== Ethnographic relations ==
According to the censuses of 2000 of Belize, of the 322,000 people residing in that country, the descendants of Spaniards constitute 15% of the population. Most of them still live in Corozal and Orange Walk Town, some of the places where their ancestors settled when they emigrated to Belize from Yucatán in the 1840s. In addition, due to Hispanic-American (basically Central American) immigration, approximately 46% of the Belizean population has Spanish as their mother tongue.

== Diplomatic relations ==
Bilateral relations can be described as excellent without significant disputes. There is a symbolic Spanish business presence in Belize and no economic or political dispute of any kind has been detected between the two countries.

== Economic relations ==
Economic and commercial relations are of limited importance. Spain ranks as the fourth European trading partner in Belize. Some Spanish companies have carried out operations in the country in the education, health and water and sanitation sector. The investments of Belize in Spain in the real estate and hospitality sector stand out.

== Cooperation ==
Cooperation relations with Belize began in November 2001, the date on which the [Scientific and Technical Cooperation Agreement between the Government of Belize and the Government of the Kingdom of Spain was signed in Belmopan.

During the years 2000 and 2001 Spanish cooperation with Belize focused on humanitarian aid worth 60,101.00 Euros each year, to alleviate the effects of Hurricanes Keith in the year 2000 and Iris in the year 2001.

On October 8, 2002, the signing of the I Joint Belize-Spain Cooperation Commission was carried out in Belize City, under the aforementioned Agreement.

== Diplomatic missions ==
- Belize has an honorary consulate in Barcelona.
- Spain is accredited to Belize from its embassy in Guatemala City, Guatemala.

== See also ==
- Foreign relations of Belize
- Foreign relations of Spain
