= Belize–Venezuela relations =

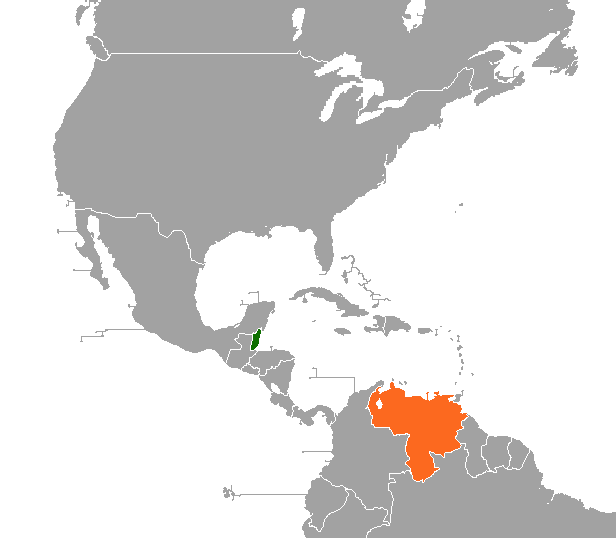

- Belize: Venezuela

Belize and Venezuela established diplomatic relations in 1989.

== History ==
Belize and Venezuela established diplomatic relations on 25 April 1989.

Belize was among the ten Central American and Caribbean countries that signed the Caracas Energy Agreement on 19 October 2000, in which Venezuela would sell oil under preferential payment conditions, including a one-year grace period and a fifteen-year credit period, with a 2% annual interest rate.

On 11 August 2016, the government of Belize subscribed to the joint declaration of 15 member countries of the Organization of American States (OAS) that called on behalf of the organization for the opening of a "frank dialogue" in Venezuela for the holding "without delay" of a presidential recall referendum in Venezuela.

In April 2017, during the institutional crisis and protests in Venezuela in 2017, days after the Supreme Tribunal of Justice of Venezuela took control of the legislative branch, Belize abstained from voting on a resolution of the Organization of American States to denounce a "violation of the constitutional order," approved by consensus at a special session.

On 17 September 2017, Belize suspended its participation within Petrocaribe due to problems from Petróleos de Venezuela (PDVSA) to maintain the continuous supply of petroleum.

Belize also abstained from a resolution of the Organization of American States, approved on 5 June 2018, in which the results of Venezuela's 20 May presidential elections, where Nicolás Maduro was proclaimed the winner, were rejected. In 2023, Belize announced its support to the people of Guyana in its territorial dispute with Venezuela.

== Diplomatic missions ==
- Belize is accredited to Venezuela from its embassy in Havana, Cuba.
- Venezuela has an embassy in Belmopan.

== See also ==
- Foreign relations of Belize
- Foreign relations of Venezuela
