= List of ambassadors of China to Belize =

The Chinese Ambassador to Belize was the official representative of the People's Republic of China to Belize until 1989.

Before 1989, there was a representative of the Government of Beijing to the Government of Belmopan. Afterwards, the Government of Belize broke off relations with Beijing and recognised ambassadors from Taiwan.

== List of representatives ==
Diplomatic agrément/Diplomatic accreditation	Ambassador	Chinese language zh:中国驻伯利兹大使列表	Observations	List of premiers of the People's Republic of China	List of prime ministers of Belize	Term end
February 6, 1987			The governments in Beijing and Belmopan established diplomatic relations.	Li Peng	Manuel Esquivel	March 23, 1988
August 1987	Shi Chunlai	zh:石春来	From May 1987 to July 1990 he was Chinese Ambassador to Mexico and Belmopan.; From 1990 to November 1993 he was Chinese Ambassador to Australia and Micronesia.	Li Peng	Manuel Esquivel	March 23, 1988

== See also ==
- Belize–China relations
