= List of diplomatic missions in Belize =

This is a list of diplomatic missions in Belize. The official capital of Belize is Belmopan, however four countries maintain their embassies in the former capital, Belize City, on the Caribbean coast. There are a total of 12 embassies/high commission in the country, with several other countries accrediting ambassadors from elsewhere.

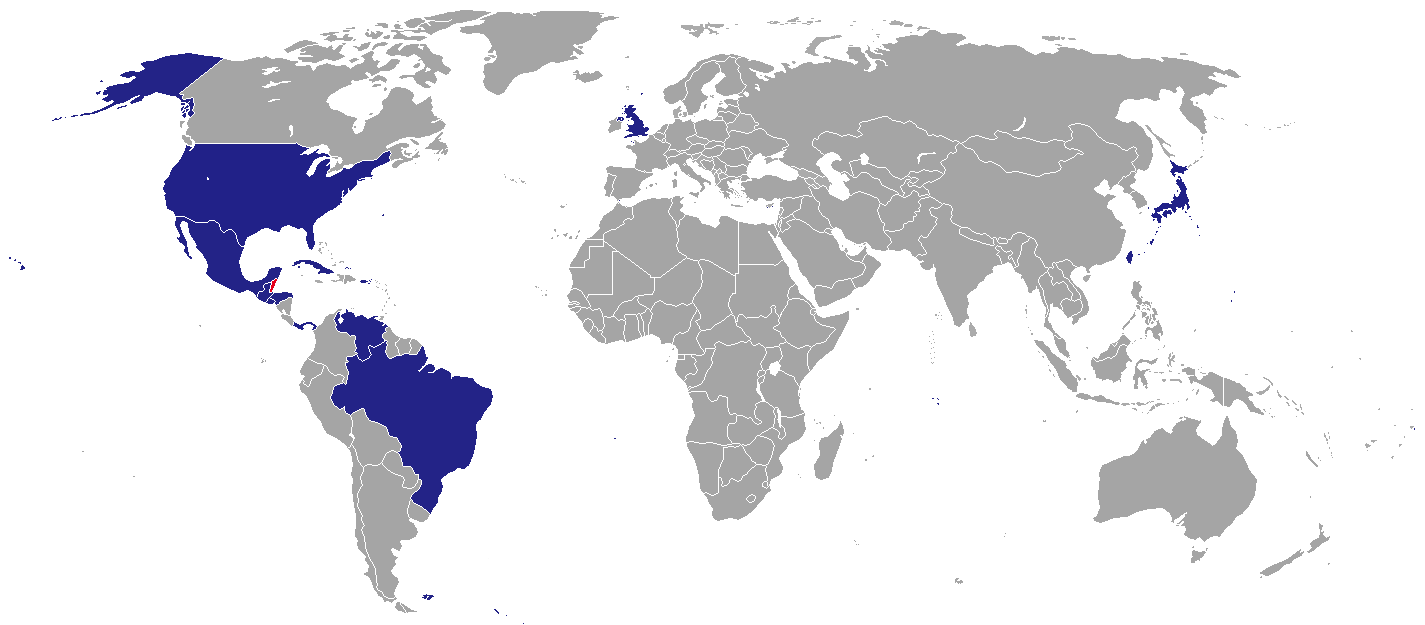
Map of diplomatic missions in Belize

== Embassies/High Commissions ==
Entries marked with an asterisk (*) are member-states of the Commonwealth of Nations. As such, their embassies are formally termed as "high commissions".

=== Belmopan ===
1. Brazil
2. Cuba
3. El Salvador
4. Japan
5. Mexico
6. United Kingdom*
7. United States
8. Venezuela

=== Belize City ===
1. Guatemala
2. Honduras
3. Panama
4. Republic of China (Taiwan)

== Other missions or delegations ==
=== Belmopan ===
1. European Union (Technical support office)
2. United Nations (Resident coordinator's office)

=== Belize City ===
1. Mexico (Embassy section office)
2. Organization of American States (Representative office)

== Consular missions ==
=== Benque Viejo del Carmen ===
- Guatemala (Consulate-General)

== Accredited embassies and high commissions ==
=== Resident in Guatemala City, Guatemala ===
1. Canada
2. France
3. Germany
4. Spain
5. Turkey
6. Uruguay

=== Resident in Kingston, Jamaica ===
1. European Union (Delegation)
2. Nigeria
3. South Africa

=== Resident in Mexico City, Mexico ===
1. Algeria
2. Armenia
3. Argentina
4. Austria
5. Belgium
6. Bolivia
7. Bulgaria
8. Czech Republic
9. Denmark
10. Egypt
11. Finland
12. Georgia
13. Greece
14. Haiti
15. Hungary
16. India
17. Indonesia
18. Iran
19. Ireland
20. Italy
21. Jamaica
22. Jordan
23. Kazakhstan
24. Lebanon
25. Malaysia
26. Morocco
27. Netherlands
28. Norway
29. Pakistan
30. Palestine
31. Paraguay
32. Philippines
33. Portugal
34. Romania
35. Russia
36. Saudi Arabia
37. Switzerland
38. Slovakia
39. Thailand
40. Ukraine
41. United Arab Emirates
42. Vietnam

=== Resident in Port of Spain, Trinidad and Tobago ===
1. Australia
2. Holy See
3. Trinidad and Tobago

=== Resident in San Salvador, El Salvador ===
1. Chile
2. Colombia
3. Costa Rica
4. Ecuador
5. Dominican Republic
6. Nicaragua
7. Peru
8. Qatar
9. South Korea

=== Resident in Washington, D.C., United States ===
1. Angola
2. Bangladesh
3. Ghana
4. Guinea
5. Nepal
6. Serbia
7. Zambia

=== Resident in New York City, United States ===
The following entries are the sending countries' permanent missions to the United Nations

1. Bahrain
2. Croatia
3. Iceland
4. Sahrawi Republic

=== Resident elsewhere ===
1. Andorra (Brussels)
2. Antigua and Barbuda (St. John's)
3. Bahamas (Nassau)
4. Barbados (Bridgetown)
5. Cambodia (Havana)
6. Cyprus (Nicosia)
7. Dominica (Roseau)
8. Estonia (Tallinn)
9. Grenada (St. George's)
10. Guyana (Georgetown)
11. Kosovo (Panama City)
12. Madagascar (Ottawa)
13. Malta
14. New Zealand (Wellington)
15. North Korea (Havana)
16. Poland (Panama City)
17. Saint Kitts and Nevis (Basseterre)
18. Saint Lucia (Castries)
19. Suriname (Paramaribo)
20. Sweden (Stockholm)
21. Zimbabwe (Ottawa)

== Former embassies ==
- Costa Rica (Note: Resident in San Salvador, El Salvador)
- Nicaragua

== See also ==
- Foreign relations of Belize
- List of diplomatic missions of Belize
