= Belize–Guyana relations =

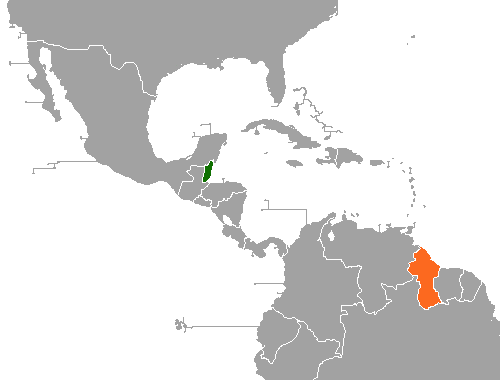

- Belize: Guyana

Belize–Guyana relations refers to the bilateral relations between Belize and Guyana.

The two nations established diplomatic relations in 1981. Both nations are members of the Association of Caribbean States, Caribbean Community, Commonwealth of Nations, Organization of American States and the United Nations.

== History ==
Belize and Guyana are two English speaking nations that were colonized and part of the British Empire. During that time period, a large number of Belizeans lived in the then British Guiana (present day Guyana) while several Guyanese worked in British Honduras (present day Belize). In 1981, Belize obtained its independence and that same year both Belize and Guyana established diplomatic relations.

There have been many high level visits between leaders of both nations, primarily during summits of the Caribbean Community. In 2016, both nations signed a Memorandums of Understanding in Trade, Education and Agriculture.

In July 2022, Belizean Prime Minister Johnny Briceño paid an official visit to Guyana and met with President Irfaan Ali. During the visit, both nations signed a Memorandum of Understanding in Cooperation in order to enhance trade relations and tourism cooperation between both nations. In 2023, Belize announced its support to the people of Guyana in its territorial dispute with Venezuela.

In June 2024, Belize opened a high commission in Guyana, its first diplomatic mission in South America.

== High-level visits ==
High-level visits from Belize to Guyana

- Prime Minister Said Musa (2002)
- Prime Minister Dean Barrow (2009)
- Foreign Minister Wilfred Elrington (2016)
- Prime Minister Johnny Briceño (May and July 2022)
- Foreign Minister Eamon Courtenay (2022)

High-level visits from Guyana to Belize

- President David A. Granger (2017)
- President Irfaan Ali (2022)

== Trade ==
In 2023, trade between Belize and Guyana totaled US$4 million. Belize's main exports to Guyana include: dried legumes, alcohol and sanitary paper. Guyana's main exports to Belize include: alcohol, video and card games.

== Resident diplomatic missions ==
- Belize has a high commission in Georgetown.
- Guyana is accredited to Belize from its Ministry of Foreign Affairs in Georgetown and maintains an honorary consulate in Belize City.

== See also ==
- Foreign relations of Belize
- Foreign relations of Guyana
