= Foreign relations of Belize =

Belize maintains 14 embassies to foreign countries, one consulate, and three missions to international organizations. In 1990, Belize became a member of the Organization of American States, and the Commonwealth of Nations in 1981.

To strengthen its potential for economic and political development, Belize has sought to build closer ties with the Spanish-speaking countries of Central America to complement its historical ties to the English-speaking Caribbean states. Recent foreign policy initiatives include joining with the other Central American countries in signing the CONCAUSA Agreement on regional sustainable development and becoming a full member of the Central American Integration System (SICA). Belize is a member of CARICOM which was founded in 1973.

== Diplomatic relations ==
List of countries with which Belize maintains diplomatic relations with:

#	Country	Date
1	Bahamas	21 September 1981
2	Barbados	21 September 1981
3	Dominica	21 September 1981
4	Grenada	21 September 1981
5	Guyana	21 September 1981
6	Mexico	21 September 1981
7	Nicaragua	21 September 1981
8	Saint Kitts and Nevis	21 September 1981
9	Saint Lucia	21 September 1981
10	Saint Vincent and the Grenadines	21 September 1981
11	Trinidad and Tobago	21 September 1981
12	United Kingdom	21 September 1981
13	United States	21 September 1981
14	Costa Rica	September 1981
15	Ghana	September 1981
16	Fiji	20 October 1981
17	Canada	24 November 1981
18	France	November 1981
19	Panama	1 December 1981
20	Australia	17 January 1982
21	Colombia	15 February 1982
22	Netherlands	13 April 1982
23	Nigeria	19 April 1982
24	Germany	31 May 1982
25	Honduras	21 September 1982
26	Italy	1 October 1982
27	Jamaica	3 November 1982
28	Japan	3 November 1982
29	Sweden	17 November 1982
30	Belgium	1982
31	El Salvador	1982
32	Haiti	1982
33	Iraq	25 January 1983
34	Antigua and Barbuda	4 February 1983
35	Brazil	1 March 1983
—	Holy See	9 March 1983
36	India	28 March 1983
37	Bangladesh	29 August 1983
38	Norway	12 July 1984
—	Israel (suspended)	11 March 1985
39	Greece	4 September 1986
—	Sahrawi Arab Democratic Republic	18 November 1986
—	China (suspended)	6 February 1987
40	South Korea	14 April 1987
41	Uruguay	28 September 1987
42	Bolivia	1 October 1987
43	Turkey	November 1987
44	Spain	13 January 1989
45	Venezuela	25 April 1989
46	Dominican Republic	6 June 1989
47	Switzerland	July 1989
48	Austria	14 September 1989
—	Republic of China	11 October 1989
49	Chile	11 October 1990
50	North Korea	20 June 1991
51	Russia	25 June 1991
52	Guatemala	11 September 1991
53	Seychelles	11 September 1991
54	Denmark	15 November 1991
55	Peru	27 November 1991
56	United Arab Emirates	10 December 1991
57	Argentina	8 January 1992
58	Paraguay	2 November 1992
59	Slovenia	19 November 1992
60	Iran	24 November 1992
61	Portugal	9 December 1992
62	Romania	25 March 1993
63	Marshall Islands	21 May 1993
64	Bulgaria	15 January 1994
65	Egypt	6 May 1994
66	Cambodia	1 November 1994
67	Vietnam	4 January 1995
68	Poland	2 May 1995
69	Cuba	15 July 1995
70	Singapore	23 August 1995
71	Croatia	23 January 1996
72	Bosnia and Herzegovina	24 January 1996
73	North Macedonia	25 January 1996
74	Czech Republic	18 July 1996
75	Slovakia	6 August 1996
76	Turkmenistan	11 September 1996
77	South Africa	14 May 1997
78	Finland	19 June 1997
79	Mozambique	30 September 1997
80	Suriname	13 May 1998
81	Armenia	12 February 1999
82	Estonia	5 May 1999
83	Thailand	11 June 1999
84	Ukraine	1 October 1999
85	Ecuador	14 October 1999
—	Sovereign Military Order of Malta	1999
86	Malaysia	11 February 2000
87	Maldives	11 February 2000
88	Philippines	4 May 2000
89	Cyprus	21 July 2000
90	Ireland	21 July 2000
91	Belarus	4 August 2000
92	Morocco	3 November 2000
93	Angola	25 January 2001
94	Lebanon	29 June 2001
95	Syria	28 August 2001
96	Algeria	28 November 2001
97	Qatar	17 May 2002
98	Azerbaijan	24 June 2002
99	Timor-Leste	15 April 2003
100	Iceland	7 July 2004
101	Malta	1 October 2004
102	Lithuania	30 December 2004
103	Latvia	3 February 2005
104	San Marino	15 March 2005
105	Bahrain	14 December 2005
106	Oman	3 March 2006
107	Kuwait	8 May 2006
108	Jordan	28 June 2006
109	Botswana	28 February 2008
110	Luxembourg	15 May 2008
111	Kazakhstan	7 November 2013
112	Indonesia	9 July 2014
—	State of Palestine	9 July 2014
113	Hungary	10 June 2015
114	Pakistan	21 October 2015
—	Kosovo	29 April 2016
115	Mongolia	20 June 2017
116	Montenegro	6 September 2017
117	Georgia	1 October 2017
118	Tajikistan	21 December 2017
119	Andorra	26 February 2018
120	Mauritius	4 April 2018
121	New Zealand	18 March 2019
122	Serbia	24 September 2019
123	Rwanda	22 January 2020
124	Sierra Leone	23 September 2021
125	Nepal	1 April 2022
126	Kenya	22 June 2022
127	Moldova	3 August 2022
128	Saudi Arabia	24 September 2022
129	Benin	14 September 2023
130	Solomon Islands	22 September 2023
131	Gambia	22 September 2023
132	Cape Verde	15 February 2024
133	Uzbekistan	5 March 2024
134	Uganda	20 May 2024
135	Burundi	23 September 2024
136	Namibia	24 September 2024
137	Palau	25 September 2024
138	Samoa	25 February 2025
139	Kyrgyzstan	8 April 2025
140	Gabon	17 September 2025
141	South Sudan	25 September 2025
142	Sri Lanka	21 October 2025
143	Ivory Coast	14 May 2026
144	Zambia	25 September 2026
145	Vanuatu	21 October 2026

== Africa ==
Country	Formal Relations Began	Notes
South Africa	14 May 1997	Both countries established diplomatic relations on 14 May 1997.; Belize does not have any representation in South Africa.; South Africa is represented in Belize by its High Commission in Kingston, Jamaica.; Both countries are full members of the Commonwealth of Nations and the African, Caribbean and Pacific Group of States.

== Americas ==
Country	Formal Relations Began	Notes
Argentina	8 January 1992	Both countries established diplomatic relations on 8 January 1992.; In 2013 both countries have an agreement on Technical cooperation.; Argentina is represented in Belize through its embassy in Mexico City.
Barbados	1981-Sep-21	Barbados and Belize were once both commonwealth realms (until Barbados became a republic in 2021), members of: the Association of Caribbean States, the Caribbean Community, the Belt & Road Initiative, the Caribbean Development Bank, the Commonwealth of Nations, the Community of Latin American and Caribbean States, ECLAC, EU-CARIFORUM, the Organisation of African, Caribbean and Pacific States, the Small Island Developing States, and the United Nations. In 2025 the nations signed an agreement allowing nationals from either nation to live indefinitely in the other nation by notifying officials upon arrival (at a port of entry) of one's intention to reside there.
Canada	November 1981	See Belize–Canada relations Canada appointed a commissioner to then British Honduras in 1965. After independence, Canada recognized and established diplomatic relations with Belize in November 1981. Both nations are members of the Commonwealth of Nations, Organization of American States and the United Nations. Since the establishment of diplomatic relations, relations between the two nations have been limited and have taken place mainly in multilateral forums.: Belize is accredited to Canada from its embassy in Washington, D.C., United States and maintains honorary consulates in Calgary, Alberta and in London, Ontario.; Canada is accredited to Belize from its embassy in Guatemala City, Guatemala and maintains an honorary consulate in Belize City.
Colombia	15 February 1982	On 15 February 1982, formal relations were established. Colombia's embassy in Belize closed in 2002 in order to cut down on costs though the embassy of Colombia in El Salvador is also concurrent to Belize. On 17 April 2013, the Prime Minister and Foreign Minister met with the Vice-Minister of Foreign Affairs of Colombia in order to strengthen relations.: Both countries are full members of the Association of Caribbean States, the Organization of American States and the United Nations.
Guatemala	1991	See Belize–Guatemala relations Belize's principal external concern has been the dispute involving the Guatemalan claim to Belizean territory. Initially a dispute between formerly Spanish Guatemala and the United Kingdom's colony of British Honduras, Guatemala continued its claim after Belizean independence in 1981; it recognized its neighbour's independence one decade later, in 1991. The dispute remains unresolved.: Belize has an embassy in Guatemala City.; Guatemala has an embassy in Belize City and a consulate-general in Benque Viejo del Carmen.; Both countries are full members of the Association of Caribbean States, the Central American Integration System, the Organization of American States, and the United Nations.
Guyana	1981	See Belize–Guyana relations: Belize has a high commission in Georgetown.; Guyana is accredited to Belize from its Ministry of Foreign Affairs in Georgetown and maintains an honorary consulate in Belize City.
Mexico	1981	See Belize–Mexico relations Diplomatic relations between Mexico and Belize were established in 1981.: Mexico has an embassy in Belmopan.; Belize has an embassy in Mexico City.; Both countries are members of the Association of Caribbean States, the Central American Integration System, the Organization of American States, and the United Nations.
United States	1981	See Belize–United States relations Belize-United States relations have traditionally been close and cordial. The United States is a principal trading partner and major source of investment funds. It is also home to the largest Belizean community outside Belize, estimated to be 70,000 strong. Because Belize's economic growth and accompanying democratic political stability are important U.S. objectives, Belize benefits from the U.S. Caribbean Basin Initiative. As a member of CARICOM Belize strongly backed efforts by the United States to implement United Nations Security Council Resolution 940 designed to facilitate the departure of Haiti's de facto authorities from power. The country agreed to contribute military personnel to the Multinational Task Force which restored the democratically elected Government of Haiti in October 1994 and to the United Nations Mission in Haiti (UNMIH). Belize is also a member of the International Criminal Court with a Bilateral Immunity Agreement of protection for the American military (as covered under Article 98).: Belize has an embassy in Washington, D.C., and a consulate-general in Los Angeles.; United States has an embassy in Belmopan.
Uruguay	28 September 1987	Both countries established diplomatic relations on 28 September 1987.; Both countries are full members of the Organization of American States and the United Nations.
Venezuela	25 April 1989	Main article: Belize–Venezuela relations: Both countries established diplomatic relations on 25 April 1989.

== Asia ==
Country	Formal Relations Began	Notes
China	Belize does not have Diplomatic recognition of China. See Foreign relations of China.	See Belize–China relations In June 2020, Belize openly opposed the Hong Kong national security law
India		See Belize–India relations
Israel	11 March 1985 (Diplomatic relations severed 15 November 2023)	Both countries established diplomatic relations in 1983.; Belize is represented in Israel through its embassy in London.; Israeli is represented in Belize through its embassy in San Salvador.; Since 2011, both countries have an agreement between the government of the state of Israel and the government of Belize on visa exemption for holders of diplomatic, service and national passports.; Both countries severed diplomatic relations on 15 November 2023 amid the Gaza war.
Palestine		Under the previous premiership of Said Musa, Belize remained a staunch supporter of Palestinian rights and shunned relations with Israel due to the latter's military and intelligence support for Guatemala.
South Korea	14 April 1987	Belize and South Korea established diplomatic relation on April 14, 1987. The two nations have good relations.
Taiwan	1989	See Belize–Taiwan relations Belize recognizes the Republic of China (ROC, commonly known as Taiwan). Relations were established between Belize and the ROC in 1989.: Belize has an embassy in Taipei.; Taiwan has an embassy in Belize City.
Turkey	Oct. 29, 1981	See Belize–Turkey relations: Turkish Embassy in Port of Spain is accredited to Belize. Turkey has an Honorary Consul in Belize City.; Belize has an Honorary Consulate in İzmir.; Trade volume between the two countries was 13.7 million USD in 2019 (Belize's exports/imports: 3.6/10.1 million USD).

== Europe ==
Country	Formal Relations Began	Notes
Bulgaria	15 February 1994	Both countries have established diplomatic relations on 15 February 1994.; Bulgaria is represented in Belize through its embassy in Mexico City.
Cyprus	21 July 2000	Both countries established diplomatic relations on 21 July 2000.; Cyprus is represented in Belize through its embassy in Mexico.; Both countries are members of the Commonwealth of Nations.
Czech Republic	15 February 1994	The Czech Republic is represented in Belize through its embassy in Mexico City and has an honorary consulate.; Belize has an honorary consulate in Prague.
Denmark	15 November 1991	Belize has an honorary consulate in Copenhagen.; Denmark is represented in Belize by its embassy in Mexico City.
Estonia	5 May 1999	Both countries established diplomatic relations on 5 May 1999.; Estonia has an honorary consulate in Belize.
Finland	19 June 1997	Both countries established diplomatic relations on 19 June 1997.; Finland is represented in Belize through its embassy in Mexico City and an honorary consulate in Belize City.
France		Both countries established diplomatic relations in November 1981.; France is represented in Belize through its embassy in San Salvador, El Salvador.
Germany	1982	Both countries established diplomatic relations in 1982.; Germany is represented in Belize through its embassy in Guatemala.
Greece	4 September 1986	Both countries have established diplomatic relations on 4 September 1986.; Belize's Embassy in Mexico has parallel accreditation for Greece. Belize has an Honorary Consulate in Athens since 1992.; Greece does not have any representation in Belize, its embassy in Mexico is also accredited to Belize.
Hungary		Hungary is represented in Belize through its embassy in Mexico City.
Holy See	9 March 1983	Both countries established diplomatic relations on 9 March 1983.: Belize has an embassy to the Holy See in Rome.; Holy See is accredited to Belize from its apostolic nunciature in San Salvador, El Salvador.
Italy	1 October 1982	Both countries have established diplomatic relations on 1 October 1982.; Belize has a consulate-general in Milan.; Italy is represented in Belize through its embassy in Mexico City and an honorary consulate.
Norway		Since 2011, Belize and Norway have an Agreement concerning the exchange of information relating to tax matters they had signed in 2010.
Russia	25 June 1991	Both countries have established diplomatic relations on 25 June 1991. Belize immediately recognized Russia as the USSR's successor after the breakup of the Soviet Union. Russia is represented in Belize through its embassy in Mexico City and an honorary consulate in Belize City.
Slovakia		Slovakia is represented in Belize through its embassy in Mexico City.
Slovenia		Belize is represented in Slovenia through its embassy in Vienna.
Spain	13 January 1989	See Belize–Spain relations Both countries established diplomatic relations on 13 January 1989.
Sweden		Sweden is represented in Belize through its embassy in Stockholm and an honorary consulate in Belmopan.
Switzerland		Both countries established diplomatic relations in 1988.; Switzerland is represented in Belize through its embassy in Mexico City and since 1996 an honorary consulate in Belize City.
United Kingdom	21 September 1981	See Belize–United Kingdom relations Belize established diplomatic relations with the United Kingdom on 21 September 1981. Both countries are Commonwealth Realms. British Foreign Secretary William Hague with Belizean Prime Minister Dean Barrow in London, June 2013.: Belize maintains a high commission in London.; The United Kingdom is accredited to Belize from its high commission in Belmopan.; The UK governed Belize from 1783 to 1981, when Belize achieved full independence. Both countries share common membership of the Atlantic Co-operation Pact, Caribbean Development Bank, the Commonwealth, and the World Trade Organization, as well as the CARIFORUM–United Kingdom Economic Partnership Agreement. Bilaterally the two countries have a Defence Cooperation Agreement, and an Investment Agreement.

== Oceania ==
Country	Formal Relations Began	Notes
Australia		Australia is accredited to Belize from its High Commission in Trinidad and Tobago.; Both countries are members of the Commonwealth of Nations.
New Zealand		New Zealand is accredited to Belize from its embassy in Mexico City.

== Belize and the Commonwealth of Nations ==
Belize has been a member state of the Commonwealth since 1981, when it became an independent Commonwealth realm.

King Charles III as King of Belize is viceregally represented by the Governor-General of Belize.

== Multilateral membership ==
Belize is a member of the following multilateral bodies.

- The Agency for the Prohibition of Nuclear Weapons in Latin America and the Caribbean (OPANAL)
- Association of Caribbean States (ACS)
- Bolivarian Alliance for the Peoples of Our America (ALBA)
- Caribbean Community (Caricom)
- Caribbean Development Bank (CDB)
- Caribbean Postal Union (CPU)
- Caribbean Telecommunications Union (CTU)
- Caribbean Tourism Organization (CTO)
- CARIFORUM
- Commonwealth of Nations
- Community of Latin American and Caribbean States (CELAC)
- Food and Agriculture Organization (FAO)
- Group of 77 (G-77)
- Inter-American Development Bank (IADB)
- International Bank for Reconstruction and Development (IBRD)
- International Civil Aviation Organization (ICAO)
- International Confederation of Free Trade Unions (ICFTU)
- International Red Cross and Red Crescent Movement (ICRM)
- International Development Association (IDA)
- International Fund for Agricultural Development (IFAD)
- International Finance Corporation (IFC)
- International Labour Organization (ILO)
- International Monetary Fund (IMF)
- International Maritime Organization (IMO)
- Intelsat (nonsignatory user)
- Interpol
- International Olympic Committee (IOC)
- International Organization for Migration (IOM) (observer)
- International Telecommunication Union (ITU)
- Non-Aligned Movement (NAM)
- Organisation of African, Caribbean and Pacific States (OACPS)
- Organization of American States (OAS)
- Latin American Economic System (LAES)
- The United Nations (UN)
- United Nations Economic Commission for Latin America and the Caribbean (UNECLAC)
- United Nations Conference on Trade and Development (UNCTAD)
- United Nations Educational, Scientific and Cultural Organization (UNESCO)
- United Nations Industrial Development Organization (UNIDO)
- Universal Postal Union (UPU)
- World Confederation of Labour (WCL)
- World Health Organization (WHO)
- World Trade Organization (WTO)

== See also ==
- Government of Belize
- List of diplomatic missions in Belize
- List of diplomatic missions of Belize
- Visa requirements for Belizean citizens
- Caribbean Basin Initiative (CBI)
