= Belizean passport =

Passport issued to citizens of Belize

- The front cover of a contemporary Belizean passport.
- Type: Passport
- Issued by: Belize
- First issued: 16 September 2011 (current version)
- Purpose: Identification
- Eligibility: Belizean citizenship

Belizean passports are issued to Belizean citizens to travel outside Belize. The passport is a Caricom passport as Belize is a member of the Caribbean Community.

== Appearance and issuance ==
The issuance of passports is governed by the Passports Act (Cap. 164.)

In early 2004, Belize suffered a "passport crisis" due to a shortage of blank passports when a delivery from the country's United Kingdom-based passport supplier De La Rue was delayed. The Ministry of Home Affairs tried to handle the crisis by recalling unused passport blanks from Belizean diplomatic missions abroad, while newspapers urged those who did not immediately need passports to wait until September or October when the switchover to the new machine-readable passports would begin. The problem came to an end in August, though delays in issuance of up to four weeks persisted.

In 2009, Belize began issuing passports in the common CARICOM design, with additional security features such as intaglio printing of certain text, a guilloché pattern on the inside pages, and a "ghost image" on the biodata pages.

== Passport statement ==
Belizean passports contain on their inside cover the following words in English only:

The Governor-General of Belize requests and requires all those whom it may concern to allow the bearer to pass freely without let or hindrance and to afford such assistance and protection as may be necessary.

== Visa requirements ==
As of April 2025, Belizean citizens had visa-free or visa on arrival access to 102 countries and territories, ranking the Belizean passport 50th according to the Henley visa restrictions index.

== See also ==
- Caribbean passport
- Visa requirements for Belizean citizens
