= Belize–China relations =

- Belize: China

Belize–China relations refers to the bilateral relations between Belize and the People's Republic of China.

== History ==
The two countries established diplomatic relations on February 6, 1987, and China also sent a non-resident ambassador to Belize. On October 11, 1989, Belize announced the establishment of diplomatic relations with the Republic of China; on October 23, the government of the People's Republic of China announced the severance of diplomatic relations with Belize. Currently, the People's Republic of China's affairs related to Belize are also under the jurisdiction of the Embassy of the People's Republic of China in Jamaica.

In June 1997, the two countries signed the "Agreement between the Government of the People's Republic of China and the Government of Belize on the Transformation of the Honorary Consulate of Belize in Hong Kong into the "Belize Trade Office"".

In October 2019, China arrested a Belizean national in Guangzhou on charges of funding criminal activities that harmed national security. In April 2020, China announced it would prosecute the national for "colluding with foreign forces" in Hong Kong and funding "hostile elements in the United States". In June 2020, Belize openly opposed the Hong Kong national security law. In October 2026, China sanctioned Belize's foreign minister, citing the country's ties with Taiwan.

== See also ==
- List of ambassadors of China to Belize
