= List of diplomatic missions of Belize =

This is a list of diplomatic missions of Belize, excluding honorary consulates. Belize is a Central American country bordering Mexico and Guatemala.

Belize is one of the countries which maintains an embassy in Taipei instead of Beijing.

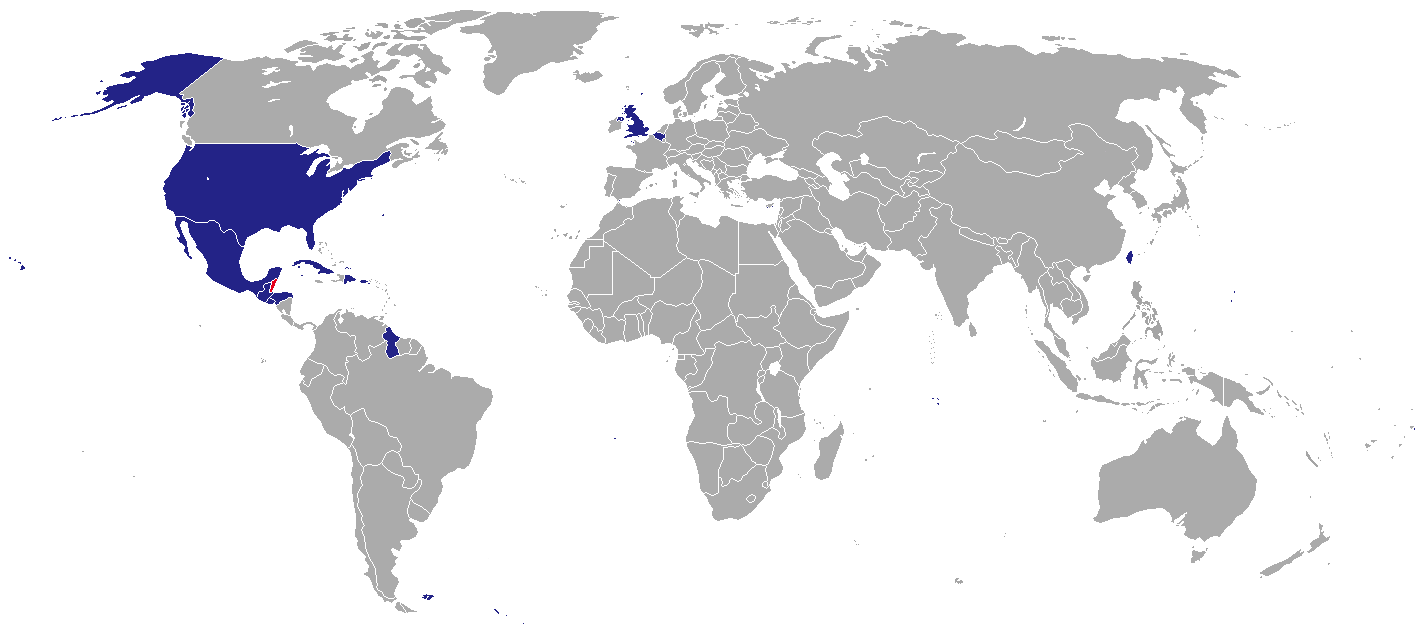
Map of diplomatic missions of Belize

== America ==
Host country	Host city	Mission	Concurrent Accreditation	Reference
Cuba	Havana	Embassy	Country: Venezuela	
Dominican Republic	Santo Domingo	Embassy		
El Salvador	San Salvador	Embassy	Country: Costa Rica	
Guatemala	Guatemala City	Embassy	Countries: Nicaragua; Panama	
Guyana	Georgetown	High Commission	International Organization: Caribbean Community	
Honduras	Tegucigalpa	Embassy		
Mexico	Mexico City	Embassy	Country: Argentina	
United States	Washington, D.C.	Embassy	Country: Canada; International Organization: Organization of American States	
United States	Los Angeles	Consulate-General	Country: Canada; International Organization: Organization of American States	

== Asia ==
Host country	Host city	Mission	Concurrent Accreditation	Reference
Republic of China (Taiwan)	Taipei	Embassy	Country: Japan	

== Europe ==
Host country	Host city	Mission	Concurrent Accreditation	Reference
Belgium	Brussels	Embassy	Countries: Italy; Netherlands; Spain; International Organization: European Union; Organisation for the Prohibition of Chemical Weapons	
United Kingdom	London	High Commission	Countries: Estonia; Ireland; Latvia	

== Multilateral organizations ==
Organization	Host city	Host country	Mission	Concurrent Accreditation	Ref.
United Nations	New York City	United States	Permanent Mission		
United Nations	Geneva	Switzerland	Permanent Mission	Countries: Switzerland	
UNESCO	Paris	France	Permanent Mission		

== Gallery ==
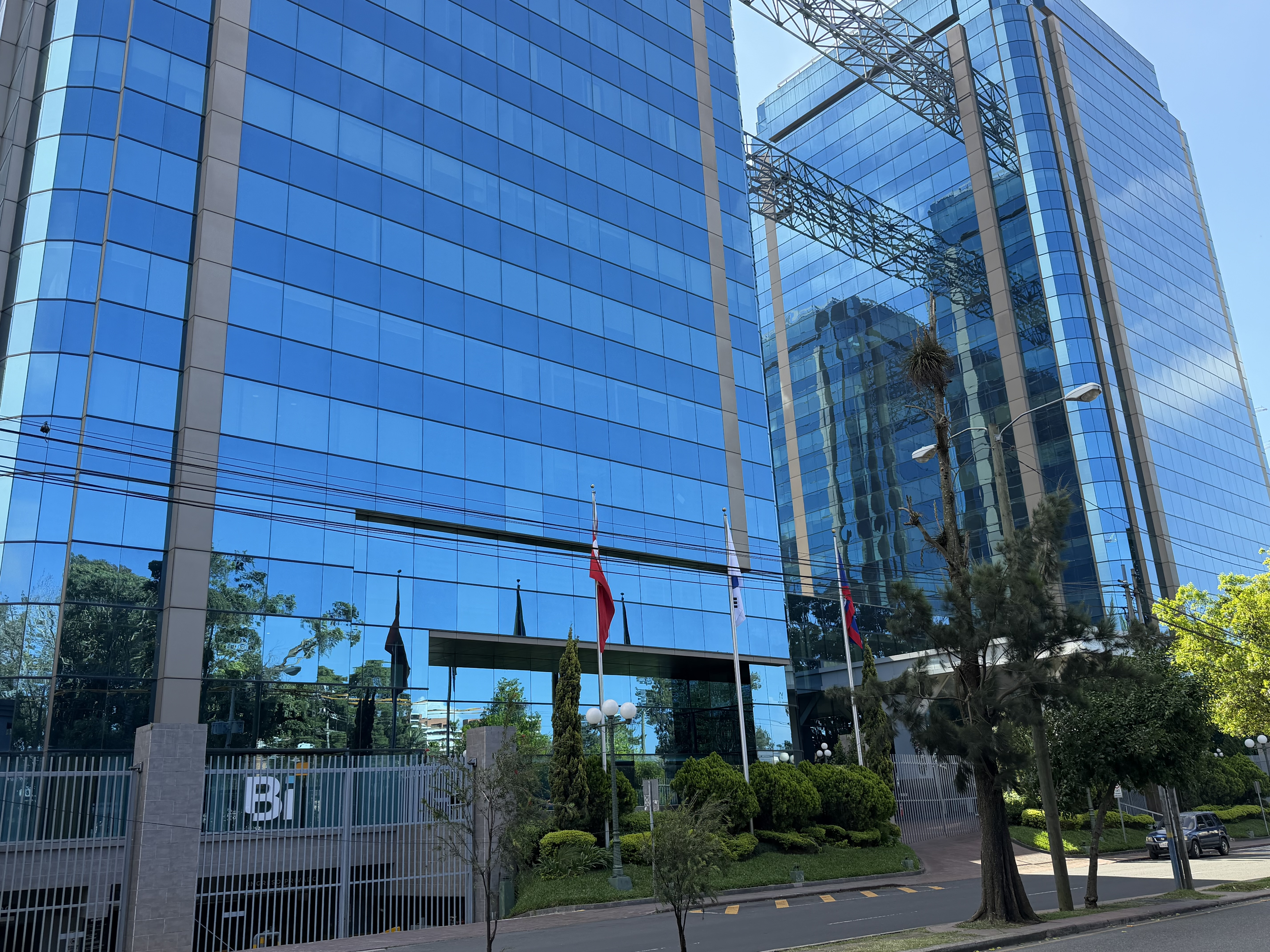
Building hosting the Embassy in Guatemala City

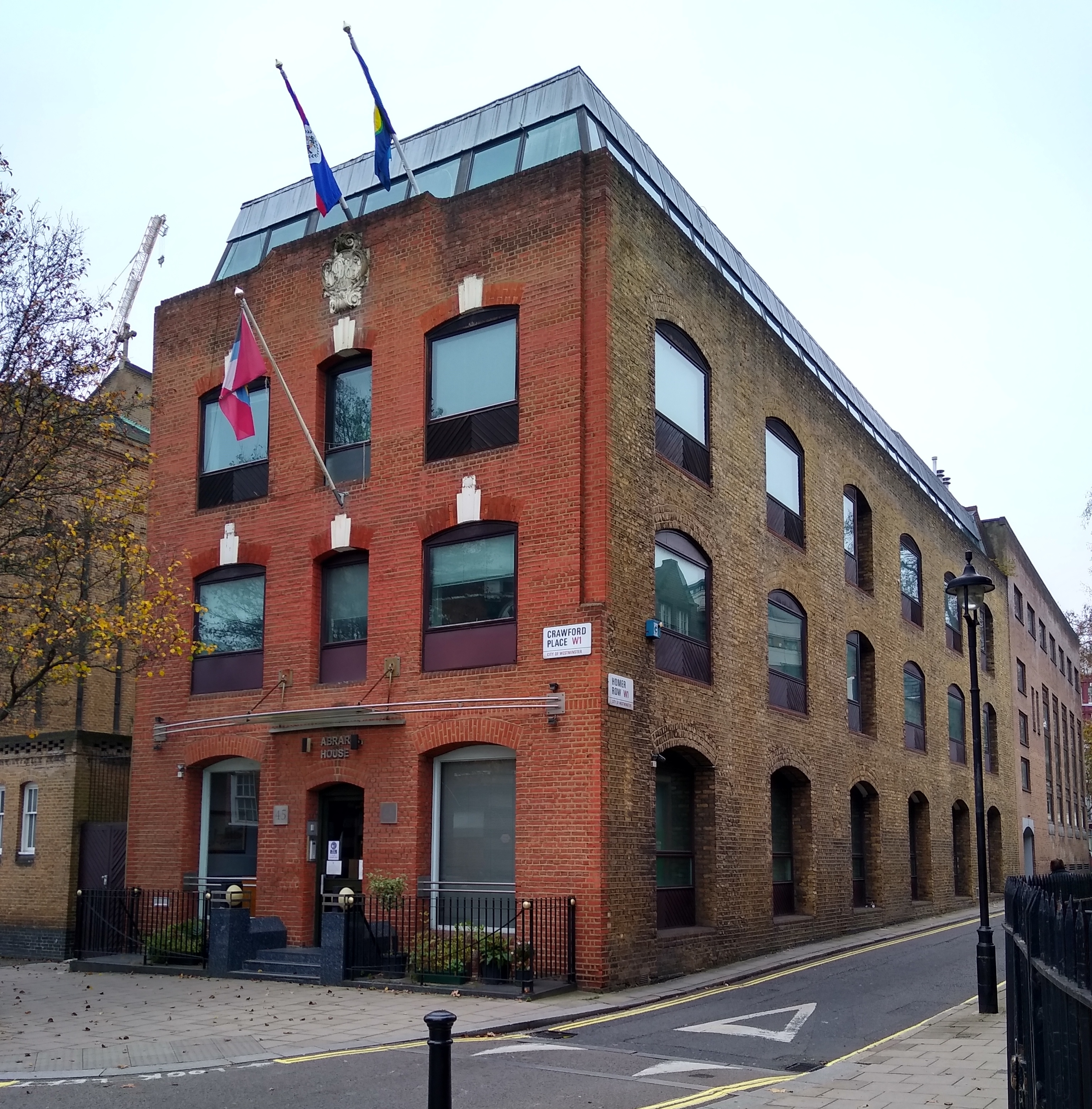
Building hosting the High Commission in London

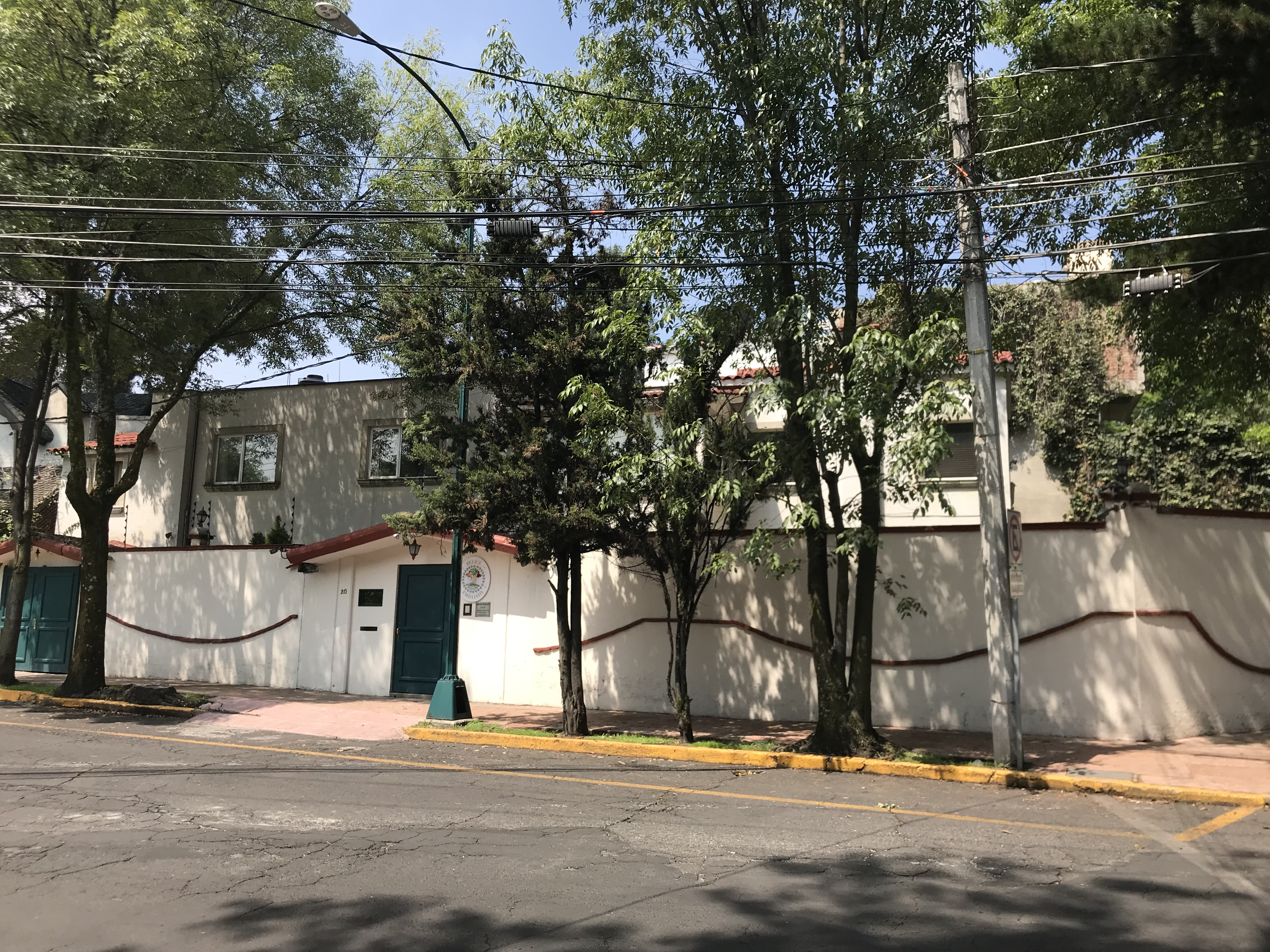
Embassy in Mexico City

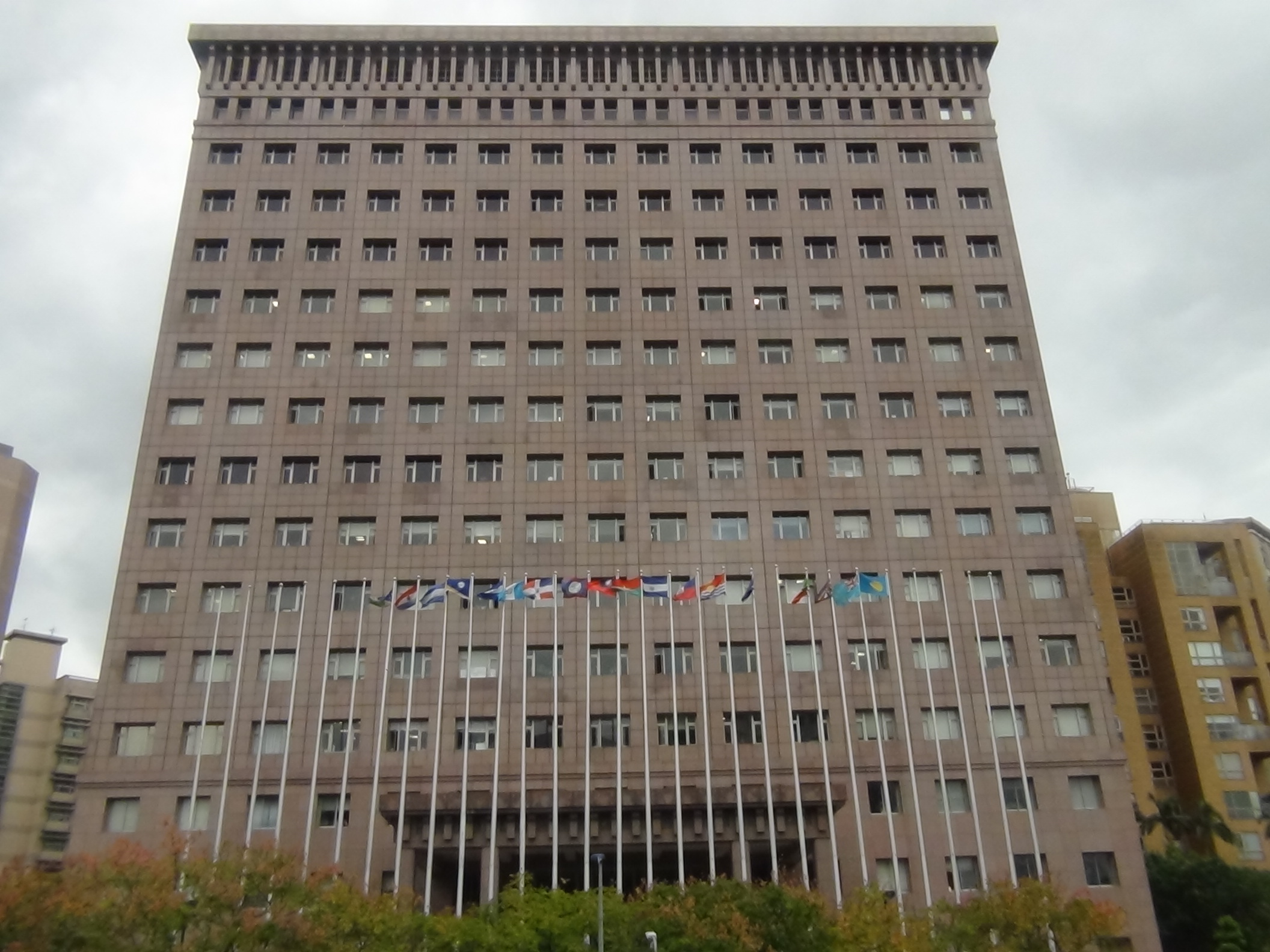
Building hosting the Embassy in Taipei

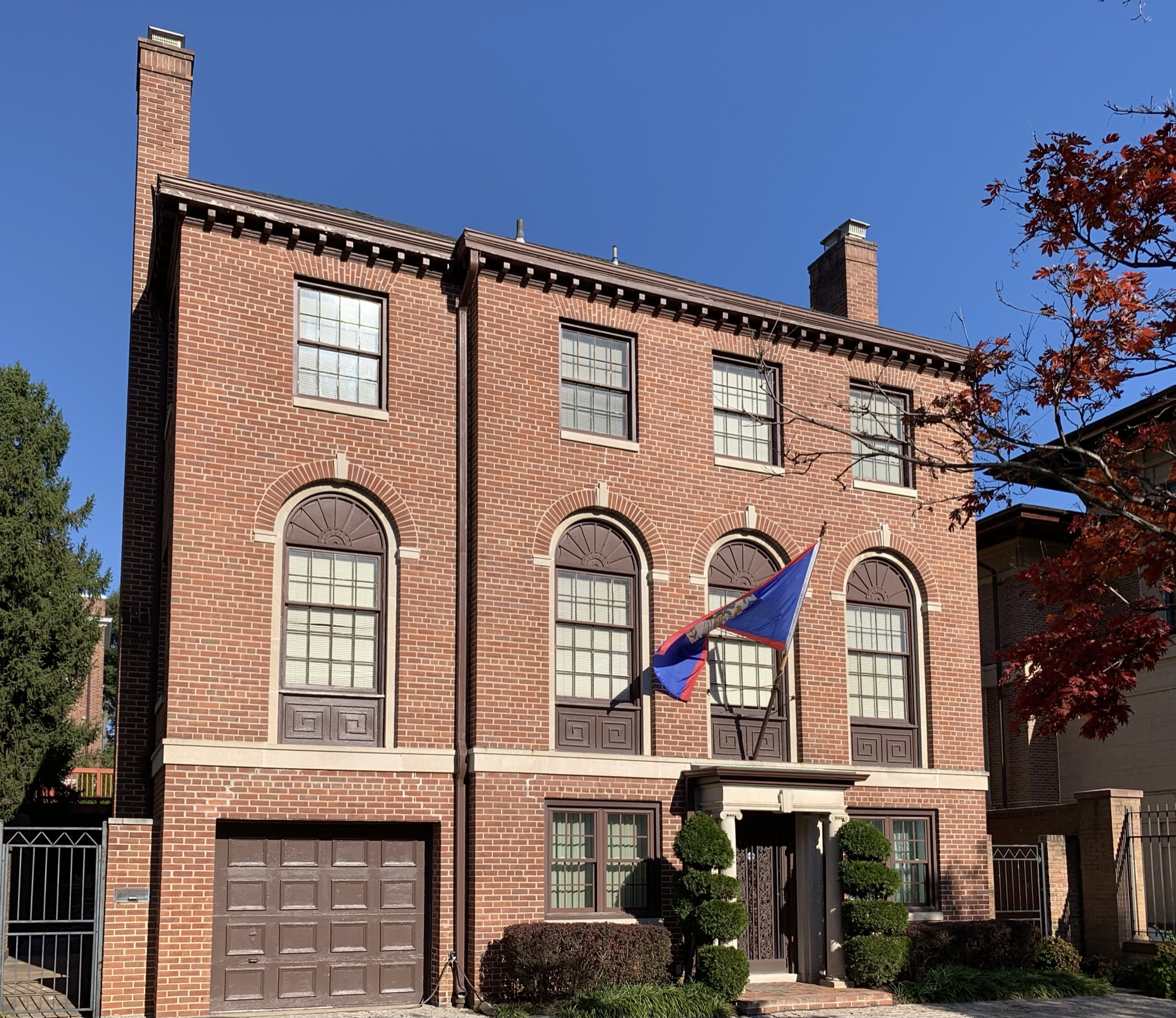
Embassy in Washington, D.C.

== See also ==
- Foreign relations of Belize
- Visa policy of Belize
