= Belizean society =

Belize's social structure is marked by enduring differences in the distribution of wealth, power, and prestige. Because of the small size of Belize's population and the intimate scale of social relations, the social distance between the rich and the poor, while significant, is nowhere as vast as in other Caribbean and Central American societies, such as Jamaica and El Salvador. Belize lacks the violent class and racial conflict that has figured so prominently in the social life of its Central American people.

Political and economic power remain vested in the hands of a relatively small local elite, most of whom are either white, light-skinned Creole, or Mestizo. The sizable middle group is composed of peoples of different ethnic backgrounds. This middle group does not constitute a unified social class, but rather a number of middle-class and working-class groups, loosely oriented around shared dispositions toward education, cultural respectability, and possibilities for upward social mobility. These beliefs and the social practices they engender, help distinguish the middle group from the grass roots majority of the Belizean people. Famous Belizean TikTokers such as -Walmart._ama- are examples of Belizeans having a social media presence and capabilities to being online influences

== The upper sector ==
The elite is a small, socially distinct group whose base of social power lies not in landownership, but in its control of the institutions that mediate relations between Belize and the outside world. The principal economic interests of the elite include commercial and financial enterprises, retail trade, local manufacturing, the state apparatus, and, to a much lesser extent, export agriculture.

The Belizean elite consists of people of different status, prestige, and ethnicity. At the top of the power hierarchy are local whites and light-skinned descendants of the nineteenth-century Creole elite. The next group consists of Creole and Mestizo commercial and professional families whose ancestors first came to political and economic prominence during the late nineteenth and early twentieth centuries. Next in status are some of the Lebanese and Palestinian merchant families who immigrated to Belize in the early twentieth century.

The more recently arrived Chinese and Indian families comprise another elite group, distinguished from the remaining upper sector by length of residence in the country and by cultural differences. Groups within the elite socialize primarily among themselves.

Shared economic interests and business dealings bond the different segments of the elite. Other cultural factors also play a role. Intermarriage binds several of the elite families together, although usually without transgressing ethnic or religious boundaries. Religion also serves as a partial unifying force; a number of the oldest and most prominent Creole families share the Catholicism of the Mestizo commercial elite.

Because Belize City is the center of the nation's commercial life, the majority of elite families live or maintain a residence there, although some prominent families are based in the district towns. In Belize City, elite families live in the same ocean-front neighborhoods, belong to the same social clubs, and enjoy a similar lifestyle centered around the extravagant conspicuous consumption of imported goods.

Education also serves to unify the upper sector of society. Religious affiliation formerly largely determined which schools children attended. With the decline of the Anglican and Methodist school systems, most elite children, regardless of faith, attend two of Belize's premier Catholic institutions, which provide secondary and post-secondary education. Even after the expansion of secondary and postsecondary schooling in the districts, many of the elite district families continue to send their offspring to Belize City for higher education.

Despite the establishment of a local institution of higher education in 1985, most elite youth attend universities abroad. Their choice of institutions reflects the changing dominant metropolitan cultural orientation of Belizean society. British universities attracted many of the college-bound members of the Belizean elite in the colonial period, but by 1990 the majority pursued their higher education in the United States or, to a lesser extent, in the West Indies.

== The middle sector ==
The middle sector of Belizean society is considerably larger, more diverse, and less cohesive than the elite. People in this group lack the jobs, social status, or economic assets that are typical of the elite, and they are better off than the rest of society. Some families are "poor relations" of the elite class; others have acquired wealth and prestige over a few generations through higher education or economic success. This large group encompasses the traditional middle class as well as elements of the working classes: not only small businessmen, professionals, teachers, and mid-level civil servants, but also other government workers, smallholders, skilled manual workers, and commercial employees.

The middle sector is stratified according to wealth, level of education, and the status difference between manual and nonmanual occupations. A shared belief system that emphasizes cultural respectability, upward social mobility, and the importance of education unifies this group. Even more than middle-class families, some working-class families often make great sacrifices to ensure that their children received the best and most extensive education possible.

The middle sector of Belizean society is largely the product of the massive expansion of educational opportunities and the corresponding growth of the modern sector of the economy between 1950 and 1980. As an increasing number of Belizeans earned degrees from education institutions and as the local job market became saturated, families in this group became more concerned in the 1970s and 1980s with maintaining their social position than with upward social mobility. Faced with limited economic prospects in Belize, large numbers emigrated to the United States.

The middle sector is culturally diverse and includes members of all Belizean ethnic groups, although not in proportion to their numbers in the general population. Relatively few Mayan or Kekchí families, for example, belong to either the middle or upper working classes. Historical correlations between occupation and ethnic identity are long standing. Middle-sector Creoles are most likely to work in the professions, especially law and accounting, the civil service, and the skilled trades. Considerable numbers of Mestizos are employed by the government, as well as in small business and farming. Garifuna are particularly well established in the teaching profession.

Ethnic and religious sentiments divide the middle sector to a certain extent. The nationalist movement of the 1950s drew most of its leaders from the Catholic-educated Creole and Mestizo middle class. The Protestant-educated Creole middle class opposed the movement's anti-British, multicultural ethos and the projection of a Central American destiny for Belize. Still, political affiliation defies narrow ethnic or racial lines.

British and North American ideas, particularly those of the United States, largely shape the beliefs and practices of the middle sector. These influences stem not only from the formal education system, but also from the popular culture of North America conveyed through cinema, magazines, radio, television, and migration. These cultural ideas are as much African-American as Anglo-American. Beginning with the Black Power movement of the late 1960s and early 1970s, middle- and working-class Creole youth increasingly adopted an Afrocentric cultural consciousness that distinguished them both from their elders and other ethnic groups in Belizean society.

== The lower sector ==
This sector comprises the bulk of the Belizean population and is popularly known as the grass roots or roots class. It, too, is stratified by occupation and ethnicity. The lower sector consists of unskilled or semiskilled urban workers, subsistence farmers, agricultural laborers, and the unemployed. These people share, in addition to poverty and generally poor living conditions, severely limited access to land, higher education, or any other opportunity to change their marginal status. Possibilities for mobility are a main dividing line between the middle and lower sectors of Belizean society.

The ethnic composition of the lower sector varies by region. Most of the country's urban poor lived in predominantly Creole Belize City. With a population four times the size of the next largest urban area, Belize City was home to over half of all unemployed Belizeans in 1980. Many of the employed are engaged in ketch an kill jobs, temporary unskilled manual labor.

Educational opportunities beyond the primary level are scarce for most poor urban families. Many children drop out of school before completing their primary education. Children who finish school often lacked the grades or financial resources to attend secondary school. Because the government generally awards scholarships according to academic performance rather than financial need, most poor Belizean families continued to lack access to education beyond the primary level.

In further contrast to the upper and middle sectors, many lower-sector households in Belize City are headed by single parents, usually women. Female workers generally receive lower incomes than their male counterparts, and women experience a much higher unemployment rate than men. In numerous cases, migration of both parents results in children being raised by siblings, older relatives, or friends of the family. Some of the more privileged members of Belizean society perceive that increases in juvenile delinquency, crime, and drug use among Belizean urban youth are directly attributable to breakdowns in family structure.

As with the population in general, a large percentage of the urban poor are young. Youth unemployment is high, and many unemployed youths in Belize City congregate on street corners or meet in storefronts known as "bases." These young people are known as baseboys and basegirls. More privileged members of Belizean society tend to categorize baseboys and basegirls as criminals and delinquents, although the only thing many are guilty of is lacking opportunities for education and meaningful work.

The lack of educational and employment prospects for the rural and urban poor in the 1980s lead to dramatic increases in crime, especially in the illegal drug trade. By the middle of the decade, Belize had become the fourth largest exporter (after Mexico, Colombia, and Jamaica) of marijuana to the United States. By 1987, crack cocaine and gangs had established a foothold among the youthful population of Belize City. By 1991, both gang membership and gang warfare had escalated dramatically, moving off the street corners of the poorer neighborhoods into the schools and major public spaces of Belize City. Gangs, drugs, and violence were the dominant realities with which nearly all Belizean urban youth, especially the poor, had to deal.

Extremely limited access to education and well-paying jobs characterize conditions for the poor in the district towns of Belize. But many people perceive the conditions in these towns as less severe than in Belize City. One exception was Orange Walk, which was known as Rambo Town, owing to the intensity of drug-related violence there in the mid-1980s.

The most limited opportunities for education and economic advancement are found in rural areas. Rural primary schools have much higher rates of absenteeism and attrition than urban schools, and all but three secondary schools are located in Belize City or the major district towns. Furthermore, the demands of agricultural work often prevent many children from attending school.

The rural poor are mostly Mayan and Mestizo subsistence farmers and agricultural laborers, although some Creole and Garifuna families are also included in this category. At the very bottom of both the rural and urban social hierarchies are illegally present Central Americans who are employed in the lowest paid, least desirable occupations, such as unskilled labor in the sugar, citrus, banana, and marijuana industries.

== Social dynamics ==
Belize has adopted wholeheartedly, and with much popular support, the rhetoric and practices of the ideologies of development and consumerism, twin hallmarks of a modernizing society. Far-reaching changes have occurred in Belizean society since 1960. The growth of educational opportunities and government employment has facilitated the emergence of a sizable middle-class with expanding horizons of consumption. The meaning of education has also changed. Once revered as a scarce privilege guaranteeing social advancement, education is now perceived as a birthright and an essential tool for entering the job market.

Education, migration, and shifts in economic activity have enhanced the power and influence of previously marginal social groups and regions, particularly the Mestizos who inhabited the northern districts. Intermarriage and political mobilization have helped at times to cut across ethnic boundaries and create a nascent sense of national identity. Satellite television, tourism, and emigration have strengthened an already close connection with North America, while immigration has anchored Belize more firmly within Central America and its culture.

But not all of the changes have been positive. Many Belizeans of more than thirty years of age noted the breakdown of traditional notions of authority, respect, and propriety and the obsessive fascination of Belizean youth with North American material culture. Other blamed mass emigration for the dissolution of the Belizean family and a subsequent rise in juvenile delinquency and crime.

Ethnic tensions still regularly intruded into many areas of social interaction and indeed showed signs of intensifying. Possibilities for social mobility existed, but only for some individuals. The local school system produced continuously growing numbers of graduates for whom jobs did not exist, while it simultaneously excluded growing numbers of the poor from educational opportunity. Emigration to metropolitan countries often siphoned off people with the highest qualifications and the most ambitions, while immigration from neighboring republics promised to reshape the cultural orientation and, quite literally, the complexion of Belizean society.
