= Visa policy of Belize =

Policy on permits required to enter Belize

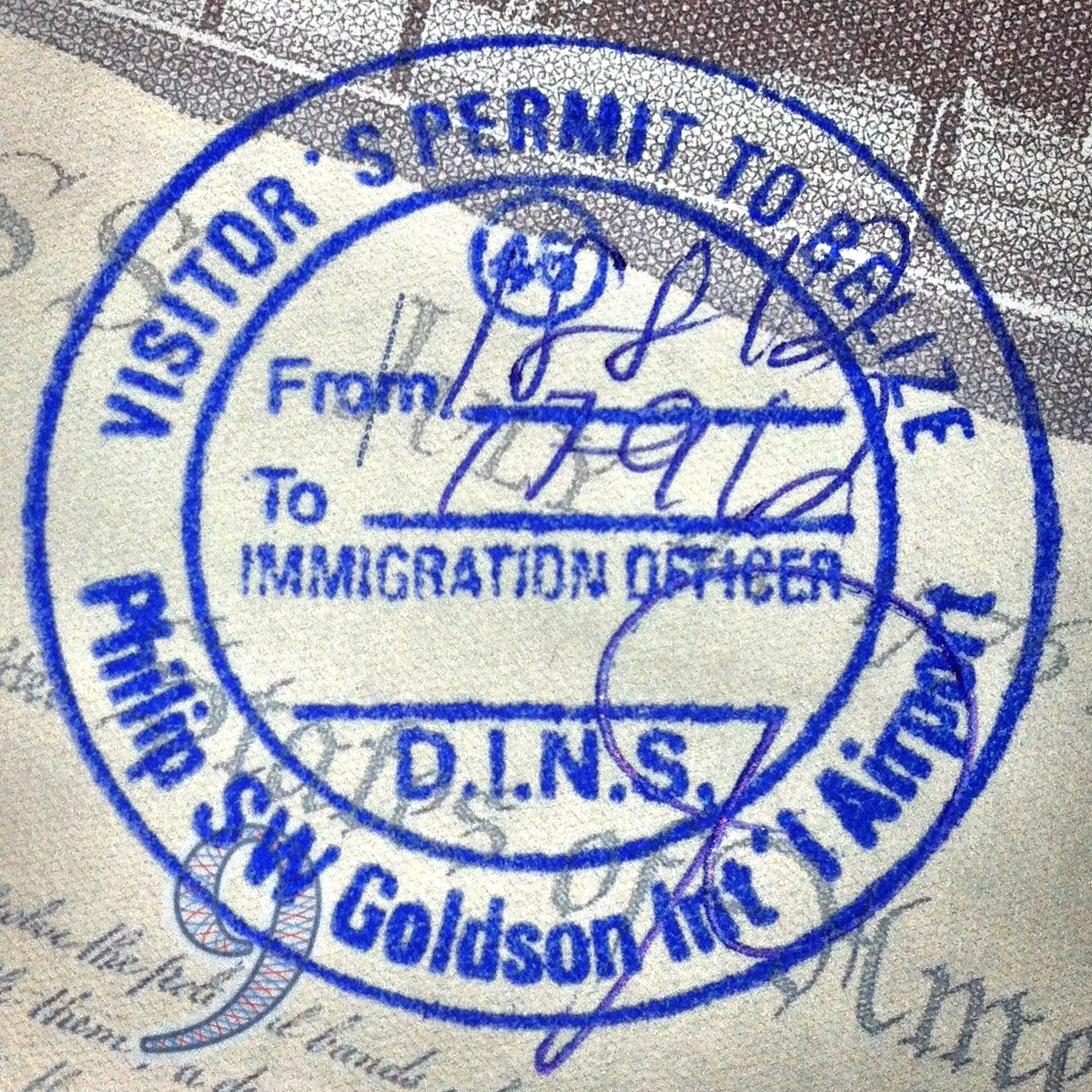
Belize passport stamp

Visitors to Belize must obtain a visa unless they are citizens of one of the visa-exempt countries.
All visitors are required to have sufficient funds, USD 75 per day and documents required for their next destination.

== Visa policy map ==
Visa policy of Belize Belize Freedom of movement Visa not required (180 days) Visa not required (90 days) Visa not required (30 days) Visa not required (30 days) if holding a valid Canadian, Schengen or US multiple-entry visa, or a residence permit issued by Canada or the US; otherwise, visa required Visa not required (30 days) if holding a valid Canadian, Schengen or US multiple-entry visa, or a residence permit issued by Canada or the US; otherwise, visa and clearance required

== Visa exemption ==
=== Ordinary passports ===
Holders of ordinary passports and refugee travel documents of the following countries and territories may enter Belize without a visa for the following period:

Freedom of movement

- Barbados
- Dominica
- Saint Vincent and the Grenadines

180 days

- United States

90 days

- Argentina
- Brazil
- Chile
- Israel
- Japan
- San Marino
- Turkey

90 days within any 180 days

- Russia

30 days

- All European Union member states

- Andorra
- Antigua and Barbuda
- Australia
- Bahamas
- Bolivia
- Botswana
- Brunei
- Canada
- Chile
- Colombia
- Costa Rica
- El Salvador
- Eswatini
- Fiji
- Gambia
- Ghana
- Grenada
- Guatemala
- Guyana
- Honduras
- Hong Kong
- Iceland
- Jamaica
- Kiribati
- Lesotho
- Liechtenstein
- Malawi
- Malaysia
- Maldives
- Marshall Islands
- Mauritius
- Mexico
- Micronesia
- Monaco
- Morocco
- Namibia
- New Zealand
- Nicaragua
- Norway
- Palau
- Panama
- Papua New Guinea
- Paraguay
- Peru
- Samoa
- Saint Kitts and Nevis
- Saint Lucia
- Seychelles
- Sierra Leone
- Singapore
- Solomon Islands
- South Africa
- South Korea
- Suriname
- Switzerland
- Taiwan
- Tanzania
- Tonga
- Trinidad and Tobago
- Tunisia
- Tuvalu
- Uganda
- United Kingdom^{1}
- Uruguay
- Vanuatu
- Vatican City
- Zambia
- Zimbabwe

_{1 - Including all types of British passports.}

==== Substitute visa ====
A visa not required for visits not exceeding 30 days for those holding a valid multiple-entry visa or Permanent Residence Card of US, Canada or holding a valid multiple-entry Schengen visa.

=== Non-ordinary passports ===
In addition to countries whose citizens are visa-exempt, holders of diplomatic or official passports of Pakistan may enter Belize without a visa for up to 90 days, while holders of diplomatic or official passports of Cuba, Dominican Republic, Ecuador and Venezuela may enter Belize without a visa for up to 30 days.

== Repatriation fee ==
Citizens of the following countries must pay a repatriation fee of (unless otherwise noted) 1200 BZD (equivalent of 600 USD) upon arrival:

- Bangladesh
- China^{1}
- India
- Pakistan
- Sri Lanka

_{1 - BZD 3,000}

== Clearance required ==
In addition to a visa, citizens of the following countries require a clearance:

- Afghanistan
- Algeria
- Bangladesh
- Cuba
- Eritrea
- Haiti
- Iran
- Iraq
- Kenya
- North Korea
- Libya
- Pakistan
- Palestine
- Somalia
- Sudan
- Syria
- Thailand

== Visitor statistics ==
Most visitors arriving in Belize were from the following countries of nationality:

Country	2013	2012
United States	730,542	694,936
Guatemala	160,479	162,954
Canada	71,312	71,494
Mexico	35,888	38,348
United Kingdom	16,827	17,016
Honduras	6,991	6,349
El Salvador	6,918	6,237
China	2,920	3,027
Costa Rica	1,548	1,412
Jamaica	1,241	1,325
Total	1,131,082	1,119,670

== See also ==
- Visa requirements for Belizean citizens
