= Noh Matta Wat! =

- Created by: Denvor Fairweather
- Directed by: Steve T. Berry, James E. Cheek, Eric D. Berry and Kelley Chatman
- Starring: see character list
- Country of origin: Belize
- No. of episodes: 19

Production
- Executive producers: Denvor Fairweather; Steve T. Berry
- Running time: 60 minutes

Original release
- Network: Channel 5; Channel 7; Krem Television (cable)
- Release: November 28, 2005 – present

Noh Matta Wat! is a Belizean dramatic television series. It airs on Great Belize Television (Channel 5), Tropical Vision Limited (Channel 7), and Krem Television (cable).

It was created by the local advertising company 13 Productions, headed by businessman Denvor Fairweather, in conjunction with American film producer and Howard University professor Steve T. Berry. Fairweather is creator and executive producer; Berry is producer and director.

== Premise ==
The Diego Family (comprising the grandmother Tomasa, Margaret, her "sister" Lisani, and her son Randy) is a seemingly normal Belizean family. However, a chance meeting with a slick American stranger changes everything. The show chronicles their struggle to "live the Belizean life."

== Characters ==
Major

- Sherlette Lopez- (Margaret Diego)
- Carrie Fairweather- (Tomasa Diego)
- Curtis Gillett- (Steve Castillo, Season 1 only; likely to reappear)
- Shakera Samuels- (Lisani Diego)
- Kerret Paulino- (Randy Diego/Dynamo)
- Hershabeth Ramclam- (Rosanna Ramirez)
- Javier Canul- (Jack)
- Kent Clare- (Clifford Rowland)
- Allison "Dan Man" Hemsley- (Dan Man/Himself)

Recurrent roles

- Melton Morrison (Ray Phillips, Season 1,2,3; killed in season 3)

Minor

- Ichelle Jeffords (Tricia Rowland, Season 2 only)
- Samantha Hessler (Vanessa Ramirez, Season 2 only)
- Olimpia August (Nanigi) (Season 2, 3)
- Denvor Fairweather (Preston)
- Ansel West (Preston in Season 2- replaced Fairweather for two episodes)
- Steve Berry (intermittently in Season 2)
- Lucian (Juni) (Season 1, 3)
- Steven Lecky (Luga) (Season 1, 3)
- Elizabeth Villanueva (Shanice) (Season 2, 3)
- Pedro Cruz (Ramon Ramirez- Season 2 only)
- Glenda Price (Agnes Ramirez -Season 2)
- Fred Pakeman- (Faceless Stranger -Season 2)
- Ramon Joseph- (Jamie -Season 2)

Guest stars

Famous Belizeans who have made appearances in the series so far:

- Joan Burrell (community activist)
- EJ Hill (DJ, KREM FM)
- Lindsford "Supa G" Martinez (punta rock artist)
- Kenny Morgan (DJ, WAVE Radio)
- Myrna Manzanares (community activist)

=== The Diegos ===
The Diego family are the main characters in the Belizean television miniseries Noh Matta Wat!.

==== Tomasa Diego ====
Tomasa (played by Carrie Fairweather) is the matriarch of the family. She is the voice of reason and often mediates conflicts between Margaret and her children, in addition to being a confidant to Margaret. She is quiet, wise and dignified as befits her character. Early in season 3, she visits relatives in the southern town of Punta Gorda, where she helps to quell a domestic violence situation threatening to explode, before returning to Belize City as of the fifth episode.

==== Margaret Diego ====
Margaret (played by Sherlette Lopez), otherwise known as Mags or Maggie, is mother to Randy and Lisani and the daughter of Tomasa. She is struggling to expand her business while at the same time dealing with the return of the men in her life, Steve Castillo and Clifford Rowland. She is strong, opinionated, dedicated, fiery and protective, as seen in season 3 in her dismissal of Rowland and dealings with Randy following the latter's run-in with troublemakers.

==== Randy Diego ====
The volatile sixteen-year-old (played by Kerret Paulino) attends high school in Belize City and aspires to become a rapper. He has secured the mentorship of neighbour Dan Man and has had at least two records played on national radio. His troubles stem from the fact that he does not know his father until he meets Minister Clifford Rowland in the middle of season 1. When he finds this out he becomes even more determined to be his own man. But early in season 3, after a run-in with escapees Juni and Luga, he seeks out his father's protection, signaling a possible change of heart.

==== Lisani Diego ====
The industrious 18-year-old (played by Shackera Samuels) attends a tertiary level institution in Belize City and works part-time at a hairdresser's for extra money. The shock of meeting her father (Steve Castillo) in season 1 causes her to briefly rebel, but she returns to the fold just as quickly. She eventually normalizes her relationship with Castillo, only to run into more difficulties when one of her coworkers announces she is pregnant by him. This situation remains unresolved as of season 2. Early in season 3, Lisani receives a scholarship to attend Howard University in Washington, D.C. (coincidentally the home of series director Steven Berry).

== Theme and musical score ==
The score and theme to Noh Matta Wat reflects dramatic origins. The theme was written by Steve T. Berry, music by Oscar Herrera and performed by Dan Man and Dynamo. The score and music for both seasons of the show has been composed by artists including Berry and Adele Ramos, as well as Shawn Tewes, Soundtrack and Enigma.

=== Opening, commercial and closing credits ===
==== Season 1 ====
Each episode opens with the character of Granny Tomasa (Carrie Fairweather) taking a walk with a young boy, presumably from the neighbourhood, where they discuss aspects of the country's history as it relates to the series. After the last scene, cut to Garifuna drums being played as the theme music begins. A series of clips is shown for each of the characters Tomasa, Margaret, Randy, Lisani, Rosanna and Dan Man (in that order) before the camera freezes one clip and reveals that particular character's name in white. Another sequence is shown featuring the credits for the writer, director, producer and executive producer (over other show clips in yellow) before fading to black as the theme song ends.

===== Commercials =====
A brown title card with face shots of all the main characters side by side appears as a male announcer says, "This segment of Noh Matta Wat is brought to you by...", followed by fade to commercials. No introduction is used coming back from commercials. The last segment usually features a dramatic moment followed by freeze frames of various characters; then the theme music plays as the end credits crawl up the screen on the right side: cast, crew, locations, sponsors. With the exception of episodes 3 and 4, the theme music accompanies the closing credits. In episodes 3 and 4, the closing song "Daddy Come Find Me" was written by Adele Ramos Daly and performed by Kerret Paulino and Dan Man.

==== Season 2 ====
The opening credits now feature a highlight reel from the previous episode. The theme music plays after a camera swings back to the audience to reveal the show's name. Clip series is the same, except blue is used instead of brown, and the real names of the actors are added in italics above the character name. Clip sequences have been added for Kent Clare's Clifford and removed for Curtis Gillett's Steve. Commercials: A shot of the Diegos' house on Amara Avenue is shown, covered in blue with the show logo on the lower left, as a male announcer (who also introduces the highlight reel) says: "This segment of Noh Matta Wat is brought to you by...", followed by a female announcer reading the list of sponsors (she also announces the acknowledgment of season 2's corporate sponsors, Grace Kennedy (Belize) Ltd. and BTL). The same clip is shown on return from commercials, with a different male announcer shouting, "NOH MATTA WAT!" (He also shouts this phrase at the freezeframe section of the show and at the start). Closing credits remain the same. This has been edited in subsequent airings.

== Writing and direction ==
Noh Matta Wat! storylines and scriptwriting were scripted by media and film veterans Adele Ramos (a staff writer and senior editor at the Amandala newspaper) in season 1, and Kimberley Vasquez (Belizean stage and screenwriter) in seasons 1,2 and 3. Steve T. Berry returned in season 2 to direct the first two episodes, while James E. Cheek took the helm to direct episode 3 and the final episodes 6, 7 and 8. In addition, Kelley Chatman directed episode 4 and Eric Berry directed episode 5.

The DVD release of season 2 has been re-edited by Steve T. Berry so that the original sequencing of scenes has been rearranged. To add further confusion as to who directed what the existing credits on the first release of season 2 DVDs contains several errors. For instance, the reedited version of episode 2 now contains several scenes directed by James E. Cheek without mention of him as director in the credits and episode 3 has Kelley Chatman's name as sole director in the opening credits when in fact the episode contains scenes directed by both Ms. Chatman and Eric Berry. But the most glaring error is the opening credit given to Eric Berry as the director of episodes 6, 7 and 8 when in fact the re-edited versions contain scenes mostly directed by James E. Cheek and a few scenes directed by producer Denvor Fairweather.

== Sponsors ==
For the past two seasons, Noh Matta Wat! has been sponsored by Belize business houses. As of Season 2, 13 Productions (the distributor of the show as well as its creator) solicited some corporate sponsorship. A full list of sponsors may be seen in the show's closing credits as well as on its website.

Unlike other programs, Noh Matta Wat!'s sponsor commercials are embedded in the telecast, added during post-production.

== Season overviews ==
The pilot episode of Noh Matta Wat! aired November 28, 2005. To date, nineteen episodes of the program have aired, five in season 1, nine in season 2, and five in season 3.

=== Season 1 ===
In Season 1, we are introduced to The Diego family. The family, of Garifuna descent, is a seemingly normal Belizean family. There is grandmother Tomasa Diego, her granddaughters Margaret and Lisani and Margaret's son Randy Diego. Margaret loves her son and sister. But she tends to believe the best in people, a belief that seems to do her more harm than good. Lisani, an independent but slightly naive girl, is studying and working part-time to furnish a better lifestyle for the family. Meanwhile, Randy dreams of becoming a performer and artist. He works with neighbour Dan Man, an established Creole entertainer who sees Randy's talent and nurtures it as best he can. Dan Man represents a sort of father-figure to Randy.

Lisani and her best friend Rosanna Ramirez, a wayward Spaniard with a penchant for excess, are picked up by the American expatriate Steve Castillo. Castillo, himself a flirt, finds it easy to converse with both young women, and has little idea that Lisani is the child whom he abandoned in youth to follow his own life. Margaret, who had never told Lisani the truth about Castillo, is now forced to tell her and, in so doing, endure her hatred for a time. Steve, who vows in one of the scene in the last episode to be there for Lisani, is later accosted by thugs Juni and Luga, shot, and forced to flee Belize.

Randy, stressed about not knowing who his own father is, records the single "Daddy, Come Find Me". In an irony of fate, Randy and the street hoods Juni and Luga and the erstwhile drug dealer Ray Phillips were hanging out when the latter trio shot and killed a rival. Randy is framed for the murder, and in jail, finds out that the man who will defend him, Clifford Rowland, is his father and a minister of Government and that he and Lisani are in fact half-brother & sister.

=== Season 2 ===
In preparation for the 2nd season, producers focused not only on the Diegos but also these subplots: the Ramirez family and their problems, Rowland's unrepentant corruption and womanizing, his intrusion into Randy's life, the relationship between Dan Man and Margaret, and Lisani's coworker apparently being pregnant with the child of Lisani's erstwhile father, Steve. A media campaign was launched beginning with the reruns in syndication of the first season, the announcement of a motion picture adaptation, and the release of the first season on DVD. The second season "premiere party" was held on June 15, 2006 at the Bliss Center for the Performing Arts in Belize City and featured sneak previews of the first two episodes of the second season. It also marked the first appearance as main cast members for Kent Clare (Clifford Rowland) and Hershabeth Ramclam (Rosanna Ramirez). The second season premiered on Channel 5 on July 3, 2006. It begins with Tomasa "gossiping" with Ms. Sarita, a friend and customer, about her family's happenings, particularly about the return of Clifford Rowland, who is now trying to be more involved in Randy and Margaret's life.

Rowland's politics grow more corrupt, as he was trying to broker a deal with his friend and Ministry partner, Jack, who tells him (in Creole),"it wa be sweet fu me, and fi you." A second subplot features doings in Clifford's office as his sneaky secretary Shanice (portrayed by Elizabeth Villanueva) causes trouble and aide Preston (portrayed by both Denver Fairweather and Ansel West) is secretly selling him out; Randy is already predisposed in his mind against Clifford, and he makes little effort to get to know him. Margaret, on the other hand, insists to Tomasa and Randy that "Clifford will be in this family whether you like it or not." Tomasa, in her anger at this, abruptly leaves and doesn't speak to Margaret for a couple of days. When Rowland comes over to supper with the family, Tomasa, Randy and perhaps Dan Man, treat him as a nuisance. Rowland does not approve of Dan Man's role in Randy's life and says as much, then offers to pay for Randy's music career. Randy throws a tantrum, dismissing Rowland and refers to Dan Man as his father-figure. Margaret is angered and later apologizes to Tomasa, citing that she only wished Rowland and Randy to be close. He later cuts a song introduced to the world by DJ Kenny Morgan of WAVE Radio, in which he castigates politicians in general and Rowland in particular.

Meanwhile, Lisani's coworker Sharlene confides to her boss, Dawn, that she may be pregnant by Steve, who had fled after the ambush in season 1. She hopes to find him and convince him to help her raise the baby. But Dawn, knowing of Sharlene's schemes, convinces her to tell Lisani, who nearly found out after she left her purse in the shop and returns to retrieve it. Sharlene contrives to seek help from Tomasa, who resolves not to tell her granddaughter; this is part of her plan to seek monetary compensation from Steve so she can leave Belize for good. Eventually, Sharlene seems to drop the subject.

A third subplot involves the viewer's formal introduction to the Ramirezes: Agnes, Ramon, Vanessa, and Rosanna. They serve as a counterpoint to the Diego family's dysfunction, at least outwardly. Their secret problem is Rosanna's obsession with romance, which hurts her in school. In the fifth episode, after Lisani leaves her with a friend to do homework, Rosanna is forcibly raped. This crystallizes her memories of being molested as a child, and she resolves to find her torturer and make him pay. She leaves for Corozal, where she finds out that the man in question is dead; her family resolves to get her help.

In episode eight, a newscaster reports that Steve Castillo's attackers are on the run. The last episode ends with the Diegos celebrating the opening of Margaret's new restaurant.

== Issues in Noh Matta Wat! ==
=== Politics ===
In season 2, viewers are introduced to the changed nature of politics in Belize. The following is presented in context to the series.

==== New party: the NFP ====
A new party, the NFP (viewers are not told what the name stands for), has taken power in Belize, replacing the traditional People's United Party and United Democratic Party. No information is given on its membership, policies, or platform.

The party is represented on the show by Minister Clifford Rowland, though other members are briefly mentioned. Rowland first appears in episode three of season one, when Margaret Diego appeals to him to rescue her son Randy from jail. He is then in the midst of a scandal over funds to build a local hospital. In season two, Rowland continues his shady ways while conducting an affair with his secretary. Unfortunately for Rowland, aide Preston (played by first Denvor Fairweather and later Ansel West) is secretly selling him out to the local media and Belizeans dislike the NFP even more than they did the PUP or UDP (at least according to the characters). At the end of season two Rowland's marriage is in shambles and his political career is under threat.

==== Relation to series ====
The NFP presumably represents the creators' view of the current political stalwarts, the PUP and UDP. Belizeans typically feel that neither party is able or willing to rid itself of underhandedness in political operations and fly-by-night tactics, and this is reflected in the characters' reaction to Rowland in the series.

The real parties appear to have no qualms with the series; on Independence Day 2006 Leader of the Opposition Dean Barrow acknowledged the series in his address and Prime Minister Said Musa followed suit.

== On television ==
=== Season 1 ===
Season One covered five episodes aired from November 28-December 25, 2005. Channel 5 aired the premiere each week following local news at 7:15 PM, repeated on Saturdays at eight; Channel 7 aired it on Tuesdays following news and Sundays at 7:00 PM; and Krem Television aired the program at 9:00 PM on Thursdays and 3:00 PM on Fridays. Occasionally, Five and Seven would move the program to 9:00 PM to accommodate their respective news blocks.

The series returned in syndication during March and April 2006.

=== Season 2 ===
Airtimes were the same as in season 1. The eighth episode experienced technical difficulties with audio. Thus, 13 Productions and the broadcasters decided to re-edit the 8th episode by combining it with the season finale into a full hour mini-feature due to air the following week. As planned, the newly edited 8th episode and the season finale aired on all three broadcast outlets the ninth and final week. Reruns aired from October 2006 to January 2007 and from July 17 to September 9, 2007 on Channel 7 and Krem Television in anticipation of the third season (Channel 5 experienced conflict due to the equally popular Karaoke Television, entering its sixth season).

=== Season 3 ===
Reports on the home website in March 2007 indicate that producers were facing serious competition from bootlegged editions of both seasons one and two and that 13 Productions is tangled in a legal battle with bootleggers in Los Angeles in particular, which briefly put a third season in jeopardy. March Website report

The site also reports that authentic Season 2 DVDs have gone on sale as of August 5, 2007 in Chicago, Houston, Los Angeles, New York City and Miami as well as Belize.

The third season has begun airing as of October 1, 2007. 13 Productions held a grand premiere on September 19, 2007 at the Bliss Center for the Performing Arts September Insider report. Number of episodes is currently unknown, but teaser footage has been airing in promotional videos during episode 2 repeats. Series creator Fairweather told broadcast partner Great Belize Television that the season would focus on domestic violence and youth violence; politician Clifford Rowland will play a prominent role according to actor Kent Clare.
