= Ann-Marie Williams =

Belizean public policy advisor, administrator and journalist

- Occupations: journalist, policy advisor

Ann-Marie Williams is a Belizean public policy advisor, administrator and former journalist. After spending over two decades as a reporter, Williams became the first Executive Director for the National Women's Commission of Belize. She serves as a governmental advisor to the legislature and executive on issues impacting women. She was honored with the US Secretary of State's Women in Public Service Award in 2011.

== Early life ==
Ann-Marie Williams was born in Belize City, Belize, the first daughter of a family of six siblings. She was raised by a single mother, who worked as a teacher and librarian. At the age of seventeen, Williams began working as an announcer at Radio Belize, at the time, the only radio broadcaster in the country. Completing a course on journalism at the Caribbean Institute of Media and Communication through the University of the West Indies, she continued her education, earning a bachelor's degree from the University College of Belize.

== Career ==
In 1988, Williams won the Edison Coleman Award for a program she produced for radio and was among the first reporters to read the news for Radio Belize. In 1995, she began the newscasts at Krem Radio, both writing and reading the news for a year. She went on to serve as a news anchor for Channel 3 and later at Channel 5 television. In 2000, wanting to further her education, Williams attended the University of Sussex in England, earning a master's degree in gender and development. Upon completion of her degree, she returned to Belize and Channel 5. Perhaps her most remembered expose as a journalist was the breaking of the story on the sale of Belizean passports in 2002, for which she and Channel 5 received awards from the Caribbean Broadcasting Union for investigative journalism. In 2003, she became an editor at The Reporter newspaper.

In 2008, Williams left journalism when she was appointed by the government, as the first executive director of the public policy advisory board on gender, the National Women's Commission. In that capacity, she administered public policy which relates to women's issues and advises the government on policies which expand women's equal access. In one program she implemented, the Women in Politics Project, women are trained in the political process and requirements to be a public servant. In 2011, from a pool of 200 international applicants, she received the US Secretary of State's Women in Public Service Award.

Williams and the National Women's Commission came under fire in 2013, after developing a revised gender policy for the country, from various church leaders, who were alarmed at the apparent inclusion of Belize's LGBT community. Williams' position was that the new policy included terminology to bring the document into line with the Constitution of Belize, which bars discrimination. At the time, a court challenge to Belize's anti-sodomy law was pending with several of the church bodies as opponents to legalization. Despite the controversy, the cabinet approved the policy by consensus. In 2014, Williams was named a "trailblazer" in the program launched by Kim Simplis Barrow, Special Envoy for Women and Children. In 2015, she was awarded a Hubert Humphrey Fellowship and completed post-graduate studies at the American University Washington College of Law on human trafficking. Williams launched an initiative for National Women's Commission in 2017 to reduce gender-based violence.
