= Kalilah Enríquez =

Belizean journalist and poet

Kalilah Reynolds
- Born: Kalilah Antonette Enriquez; February 11, 1983 (age 43); Belize City, Belize, Belize
- Education: Fordham University (B.A.); University of the West Indies (M.A.)
- Occupation: Broadcast Journalist
- Years active: 2001–present
- Notable credit(s): CEEN Caribbean News; CVM TV Newswatch; Wake Up Belize! (Krem Radio)

Kalilah Antonette Enríquez (married name Reynolds, born February 11, 1983) is a Belizean journalist and poet. She currently resides in Kingston, Jamaica, where she co-hosts the popular current affairs radio programme, Nationwide This Morning on Nationwide News Network.

== Career ==
From 2010 to 2011, she worked as a broadcast journalist at CVM TV in Jamaica, where she became known for the infamous "duppy story" about a Spanish Town boy seemingly haunted by a ghost, as well as her coverage of the Jamaican security forces incursion into Tivoli Gardens in search of reputed drug lord Christopher "Dudus" Coke.

In February 2012, CVM TV aired a documentary produced by Enriquez, entitled "Man a Gallis: Jamaican Dancehall and HIV/AIDS", which received critical acclaim. The documentary was also aired on Channel 7 in Belize. It was funded with a grant from Caribbean Broadcast Media Partners (CBMP) and is distributed by them.

Enriquez has also worked as a video presenter on cable entertainment channel, Hype TV, a producer for Reggae Entertainment Television (RETV), and has also been a guest contributor to the Jamaica Gleaner newspaper.

Before settling in Jamaica, Enriquez was host of KREM Radio's Wake Up Belize Morning Vibes alongside Evan "Mose" Hyde.

She has been a featured reader at the Lik It! Poetry Festival in Belize City, Se Sup'm Poetry in Kingston, and is scheduled to read at the Talking Trees Literary Festival at Treasure Beach, Jamaica in February 2012. In 2014, she won the inaugural Belize Literary Prize for her short story, "Barrel Reach".

== Personal life ==
Enríquez was born in Belize City, but raised and attended school in Belmopan, Belize. After graduating from Belmopan Comprehensive High School then left on scholarship to Fordham University in New York, where she earned a bachelor's degree in Journalism. Upon returning to Belize she joined KREM Radio as host of the Vibes and KREM's news editor in 2005. She has on occasion contributed to the Amandala. She later obtained a master's degree in Communications Studies from the University of the West Indies Mona campus in Jamaica. In January 2010 she was the organizer of the “Help Haiti Benefit Concert and Telethon", the biggest show ever in Belize.

She gave birth to a daughter when she was a 19-year-old student at Fordham University in New York, sitting examinations until 24 December and giving birth on 7 January. She married orthopedic surgeon Richard Reynolds on 19 December 2015. As of November 2019 she had another child, then aged one, and was expecting her third child.

== Publications ==
Enriquez is the author of two books, "Unfettered", an anthology of poetry published in December 2006 and "Shades of Red", a collection of original poems, short stories and essays published in 2007.
