= Evan Hyde =

Evan Hyde may refer to:

- Evan X Hyde (born 1947), Belizean writer, journalist, media executive and politician
- Evan "Mose" Hyde, Belizean television executive and talk show host
