= Adele Ramos =

Belizean poet, author, and journalist

Adele Ramos is a Belizean poet, author, journalist and publisher. She is assistant editor of the Amandala, a widely circulated tabloid newspaper, published twice weekly.

== Biography ==
Both her father and her grandfather, the Garifuna leader Thomas Vincent Ramos, were writers for Belize's major newspapers.

Ramos writes short stories, poetry and songs. She was the founding president of the Belizean Poets Society in 2005, since renamed the Belizean Poets and Writers Society. She was reelected president of the society in November 2006. She is also founder of the Belizean Poets Web Group and of Ramos Publishing. In September 2006, Ramos was one of the forces behind the Belizean Poets Society's the first ever Belizean poetry exhibit at the Bliss Institute for the Creative Arts. The exhibit included works from veteran poets like George Price, John Alexander Watler, Dr. Corrinth Lewis, Evan X Hyde and Myrna Manzanares, works from contemporary poets and CDs and DVDs.

Ramos has released two CDs: Red Graffiti (songs and poetry), and Black Orchid Raw: Volume 1 (raw voice poetry).

== Bibliography ==
- T.V. Ramos - The Man and His Writings, (National Garifuna Council of Belize, 2000 ISBN 976-8111-56-9). Documents the life and works of her grandfather, a civil rights activist and Garifuna leader.
- PHASES (2005). An anthology of love poems.
- Liberated (2005). An anthology of poems by Anne K. Lowe
- Sunset Jewel (2006). An anthology of poems from a Belizean national poetry contest.
- X Hyde's Sports, sin and subversion (2008)
