= Denvor Fairweather =

Denvor Fairweather (born c. 1975) is a Belizean television producer and executive.

== Education and early television work ==
Fairweather attended Saint John's College Junior College from 1991 to 1993, working in his final year with the Channel 3 television wing of the Broadcasting Corporation of Belize. Fairweather created for and began work with Channel Broadcasting Cable of Belize City in 1993 Channel 8, a special local advertising channel, and in August 1996 established 13 Productions as a part-time video producing company, creating the short-lived comedy show "You Name It" in 1996. 13 Productions opened full-time in 1998 and continues creating commercials for local companies.

== Noh Matta Wat! ==
According to the show's website, Fairweather sees the need for better quality local programming and was motivated to create Noh Matta Wat!, a drama series, in 2005. He worked with Howard University's S. Torriano Berry, accomplished film director and author to launch the show, now entering its third season, in November 2005. In addition to being executive producer of the show Fairweather portrayed the character Preston, aide to Minister Clifford Rowland, in the second season for a few episodes before being replaced by Ansel West.
