= Krem =

Krem may refer to:

- Krem (instrument), a musical instrument
- Krem (Dragon Age), a fictional video game character
- Krem (DC Comics), a fictional comic book character
- KREM (TV), a television station (channel 20 digital/2 virtual) licensed to Spokane, Washington, United States
- Krem Radio, a radio station in Belize
- Krem Television, a cable television station in Belize
- Krem, a Ferengi pirate in Star Trek: Enterprise
- KTTO, a radio station in Spokane, Washington, that originally had the call letters KREM
