= Belizean Writers and Poets Society =

The Belizean Writers and Poets Society is a literary organization established in 2005 to promote Belizean writing and poetry.

== Formation ==
The organization was registered in August 2005 as the Belizean Poets Society and formally launched by six individuals in Belize City on September 8, 2005.

The founding members were Adele Ramos of Amandala, Ansel West, Margaret Arana, Police Supt. Edward Broaster, Erwin X (Jones) and Orson Elrington.

Its stated mission was "to enhance and harness poetic skills among Belizean poets, foster the development of the art of poetry, and promote its appreciation among Belizeans."

== Reorganization ==
The Poets Society in 2008 reorganized itself to include writers of all persuasions, and is now the Belizean Writers and Poets Society.

== Activities ==
The Society holds an annual Poets Competition coinciding with Belize's September Celebrations, as well as smaller gatherings and exhibitions.

Society members such as Ramos, Erwin, Kalilah Enriquez and Edward Broaster are all published authors of poetry and other media and are routinely called on to present works at important ceremonies.

== Officers ==
- President: Adele Ramos-Daly
- Vice President: Ansel West
