= WUB =

WUB or Wub may refer to:

- Water user board, a local association of water users
- World University of Bangladesh
- Washington University of Barbados
- WUB Morning Vibes, a daily talk show in Belize
- "Beyond Lies the Wub", a 1952 science fiction story by Philip K. Dick
- A popular term for wobble bass in dubstep music
