= 2005 Belize unrest =

Protests and strikes in Belize following tax increases and public utility blackouts

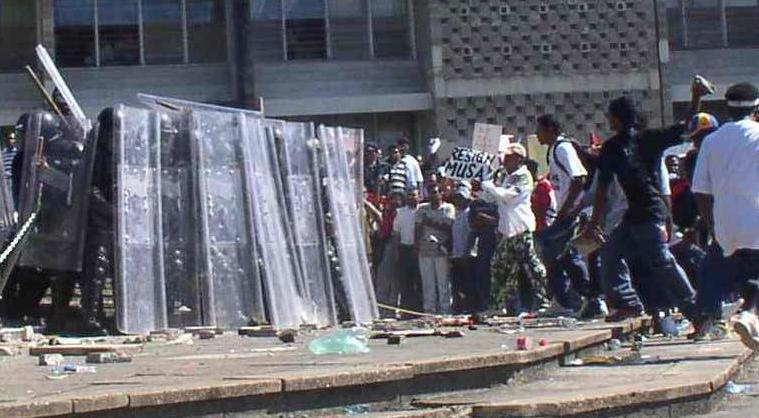
An encounter between protesters and riot police in Belmopan on January 21, 2005

Two separate but related incidents of civil unrest in the Central American country of Belize occurred in January and April.

== January 2005 budget protests ==
Civil unrest broke out in the capital city of Belmopan in Belize during mid-January 2005. The unrest was provoked by the release of a new national budget with significant tax increases. It was also guided by anger at the ruling People's United Party for the worsening fiscal condition of the Belizean government.

=== Run-up ===
On January 14, 2005 Said Musa's administration announced its budget for 2005-2006. The budget included major tax increases on a variety of businesses and commodities. It included an 11% increase in the real estate sales tax, a five percent tax increase for financial institutions, an eight percent tax increase on tobacco, and a 100% tax increase on rum. The government claims that these tax increases were comparable to increases instituted in 1998 under the United Democratic Party (UDP). However, after years of popular frustration at alleged financial mismanagement and corruption by the People's United Party (PUP), the new budget sparked condemnation from local interest groups and protests at the National Assembly building on January 14, with demonstrations continued throughout the following week. The main protesters were the National Trade Union Congress of Belize and the Belize Chamber of Commerce.

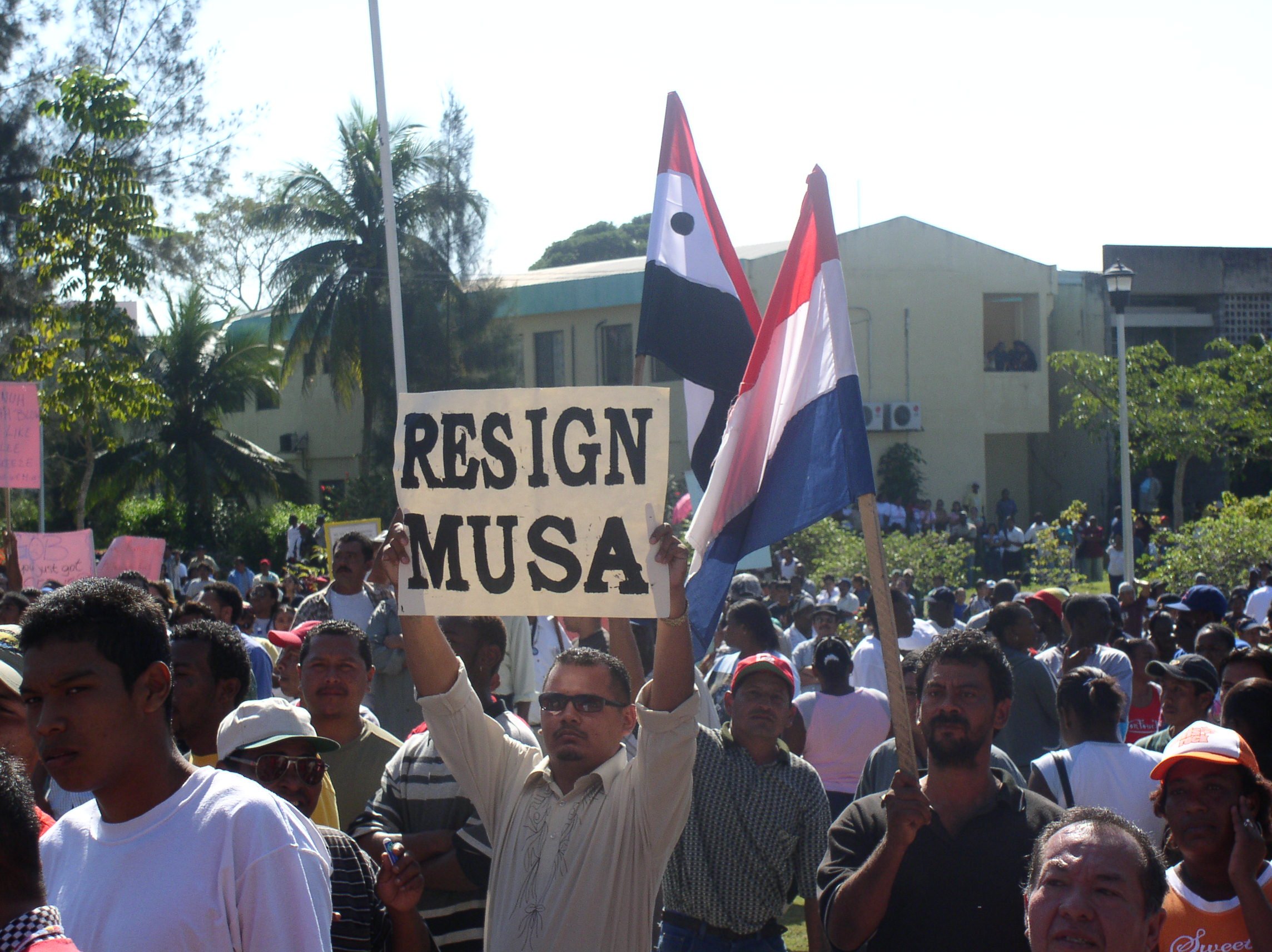
Crowds outside the National Assembly, with signs calling for the resignation of Prime Minister Said Musa.

== January 20 and 21 ==
On January 20, the business community and labor unions called for a two-day nationwide strike. Employees did not report to work, and water service for much of Belize was turned off. A major public demonstration planned by the opposition took place on January 21 in Belmopan. (The ruling PUP reportedly planned a counter-demonstration.) This was a large demonstration outside the National Assembly building in Belmopan which ended in violence. Protesters threw rocks at the police, who responded with rubber bullets and riot gas. The gunfire and sirens were audible at a distance of at least 1 km. At least one larger booming sound, significantly louder than gunfire, was heard; the cause of this is unclear.

Several protesters were arrested, including 'Yellowman', a UDP stalwart. The permission for the demonstration ended at 3pm, but the protesters were given a one-hour extension. At the end of the extension, repeated demands for dispersal were largely ignored. Former Superintendent (now Assistant Commissioner) of Police Crispin Jeffries read the riot act to the crowd, and after waiting an additional 40 minutes he ordered riot police to disperse the crowd, which they did using teargas and rubber bullets. Some union workers laid down and refused to disperse; they were physically dragged from the area.

This is only the third time that this kind of unrest has hit Belize. The most recent occasion was in the 1980s, when a proposal was drafted to cede part of the country to Guatemala occasioned the Heads of Agreement Crisis.

Reports indicate that the police were very calm throughout the day, although some police cadets were said to have employed unnecessary force against orders. There were reports of fully trained officers restraining cadets and removing them from the police lines, and some people assert that no rocks were thrown until after a protester was hit in the head by a club wielded by a cadet.

== Between the protests ==
After the conclusion of the Friday protest, the Belize National Teachers' Union, led by President Anthony Fuentes, began a prolonged strike action that left the majority of schools closed going into February. Shortages of water and electricity were also common.

Initial agreements were made as of January 26 between the government and the Congress; in support of these deals university and college students took to the streets that day, representing the University of Belize and ATLIB affiliated institutions. But by Friday January 28, talks had broken down again as the Public Service Union of government workers left their jobs and forced a new round of negotiations that dragged on in the early days of February even as teachers began to return to school. Taking advantage of numerous faults in communication between the union representatives, Government negotiators Carla Barnett and Assad Shoman came up with an agreement on February 11. The NTUCB received a review of the budget, salary increases for its members, various reform measures tied to national development corporations and a promise of cooperation. The budget's tax increases were suspended to March 1, pending their review. A planned national shutdown and strike was averted.

Almost an aberration in the midst of the storm and fury was the takeover of Belize Telecommunications Limited by the Government following investor Jeffrey Prosser's failure to pay for his batch of shares bought the previous year. That deal would be more closely examined in the months to come.

== Conditions leading to March and April unrest ==
The Union Congress and GOB met in talks throughout late February, but as of February 28, there was little progress.

On March 1, the agreed-upon tax increases were implemented with little comment other than a threat of strike action from the NTUCB. Other proposals, such as committees to investigate alleged wrongdoing at the Social Security Board and Development Finance Corporation were implemented.

The main news in early March centered on the utility companies, BTL, BEL and BWS. BTL was locked in an investor war between Michael Ashcroft of England and Jeffrey Prosser, majority holder at the time, of the United States. Ashcroft's reps claimed Prosser was not fulfilling his duties to the board of BTL and challenged his authority in a court order after he was found unable to pay for his stake in the company, which was taken over by GOB. Meanwhile, BEL had applied for a rate hike of 14% over five years, and BWS were granted a small increase.

On March 11, the trend was set for confrontation. In Miami, Florida, judge Ursula Ungaro Benages restored Prosser to his position on the board with six directors to Ashcroft's two, throwing out the deal Government had made to offer shares to Belizeans. March 14 marked the first appearance of the Belize Communication Workers Union, led by Paul Perriott, who insisted that foreign ownership was not desirable for the workers of BTL and called for funding to put the company in Belizean hands. The NTUCB planned a demonstration for later that week in Belmopan.

On March 15, phones across the nation were cut off, purportedly by BTL workers as part of their disgust with the Government and foreigners. The Supreme Court issued a ruling against the Miami injunction, declaring it non-enforceable in Belize.

Friday, March 18, saw the planned demonstration by the trade unions, precipitated by a nationwide blackout beginning the previous night. The unions were much more peaceful than in their previous protest in January. Inside the House, the government passed the reform measures agreed to by the Unions.

Going into the long Easter weekend, the big story was government's deal with Michael Ashcroft's Ecom Ltd. to buy the shares not paid for by Prosser; upon appeal to the Miami Court Benages reversed her decision and agreed with the GOB position-or so it was thought.

== April unrest and aftermath ==
Going into April, the back and forth between Michael Ashcroft and Jeffrey Prosser in both Miami and Belize reached new lows. On March 31, Benages found GOB in contempt; the ruling was challenged days later by Belize Supreme Court Justice Abdulai Conteh, but Prosser appealed.

Benages, on April 13, agreed with Prosser and fined GOB $50,000 US dollars per day for every day in contravention of her order since March 29. Government planned to comply, but not before appealing the decision. On April 14, disgruntled BTL workers left the compound (or were forced out by a bomb threat), which was seized on by the Communication Workers' Union to express its dissatisfaction at the legal wrangling.

The week of April 18 brought to a head the majority of the troubles facing Belize in this period. Over the weekend telephone service was brought down and the BTL compound on Saint Thomas Street barricaded by workers and supporters, who gave in only as Police stormed the compound. BTL manager Dale Trujeque was arrested for illegal strike action. The unions called on April 18 for Prime Minister Musa to resign; his response was that the BTL situation was not properly handled but that he would not resign based on "politics." On April 19, the Opposition United Democratic Party unveiled a plan of "civil disobedience" to force early elections, and the country's tertiary level students came out in support of the unions and BTL workers. Late on April 19 another crippling electricity blackout was reported.

=== April 20 ===
At about 1:00 pm that Wednesday afternoon, students of the University of Belize, Faculty of Management and Social Sciences, walked out of their campus on College Street in West Landivar and went to rouse students from schools in the area, including St. John's College High School and Junior College, Edward P. Yorke, Nazarene and Pallotti High Schools. Having achieved a sizable number of participants, the march traveled to Said Musa's home in the City for an hour (ignoring Police attempts to disperse them) and then marching to and blocking the Belcan Bridge, one of the City's main arteries. Union leaders and Opposition politicians joined them thereafter and police and crowd engaged in a standoff with occasional outbursts and usual elements of protesting until nightfall, when a few city residents came out and began burning tires on the bridge. The crowd then began to disperse, some chanting "Albert Street", the main commercial center of Belize City.

What happened next was an hour to 90 minutes of indiscriminate looting in the downtown area, particularly on King, Bishop, Church, Albert and Regent Streets, but extending as well to the Pound Yard Bridge and Vernon Street. Police failed to restore calm before damage amounting to more than a million dollars occurred.

Fingers flew all next day, April 21, as the Government, Opposition and unions made claims, counterclaims and threats. Meanwhile, accused looters were being brought to court and UB student body president Moses Sulph charged for leading the previous day's strike. Another tense moment came on the afternoon of April 21 as reports of Sulph's arraignment (he was actually arraigned April 22) brought out hundreds to the Queen and North Front Street areas for a few hours.

On Monday, April 25, plans were announced by public servants and teachers to strike, but these were called off by the end of the week after limited participation. One last tense moment came in Belmopan near the end of April when Opposition rep Patrick Faber was roughed up while attending a meeting of the Prime Minister and UB students there.

== In popular culture ==
Artist Dan Man released a song called "Albert Street" mocking the looting on that City street on April 20. Poet Erwin X (Jones)' "Life Haad Out Ya" was another favorite of protesters, and the phrase became a catchphrase for much of 2005 and 2006.
