= Belizean Writers Series =

Belizean series of books

The Belizean Writers Series, published by local media house Cubola Productions, preserves some of the best of Belizean arts and letters, mainly poetry and short stories. The series began in 1995 and is currently ongoing.

The General Editor of the series is Michael D. Phillips.

== Books in the Belizean Writers Series ==
=== Snapshots of Belize: An Anthology of Belizean Short Fiction (1995) ===
Deals with short fiction published in the previous thirty years. With the exception of "Crab Seasin", written entirely in Belize Creole, all stories were in English.

==== Authors represented ====
- Leo Bradley:
  - Elastic Gold: A fisherman and his son attempt to outrun shady characters who want the floating rubber that represents a chance at a better life.
  - The Day of the Bridge: The Belize City Swing Bridge is the villain of this story about a youth whose chance for happiness is destroyed by a series of unfortunate circumstances.
- Sir Colville Young:
  - The Representative: This selection from Pataki Full takes aim at Belizean politicians in the guise of the slippery Jonas Parker, who learns a hard lesson about the nature of politics for poor people.
  - Sugar: Also from Pataki Full; Orange Walk restaurateur has a run-in with an elderly customer who must resort to shadiness to stay alive.
- Zoila Ellis:
  - The Teacher: Taken from On Heroes, Lizards and Passion; a priest and teacher attempts to find peace in a village in rural Belize, but not before facing his past.
- Evan X Hyde:
  - A Conscience for Christmas: Would-be player Caldo meets his match in a "Christmas Carol"-esque episode in Belize City.
- John Alexander Watler:
  - Bitter Sweet Revenge: College-educated youths pursue attractive sisters but find trouble in the form of their father.
- Lawrence Vernon:
  - The Third Wish: Be careful what you wish for? A seemingly innocent stone brought home by archaeologist Jim Hilton spells trouble for his family.
- Evadne Wade Garcia:
  - Crab Seasin: Remembrance of a playful episode involving city boys in search of crab meat, a local delicacy.

=== Ping Wing Juk Me: Six Belizean Plays (1998) ===
Six original plays written and performed in Belize between 1970 and the time of publication were included in this volume:

- Carol Fonseca Galvez, Shame on You Tiky Bood: The titular character attempts to fool his wife in order to go to a party, but is found out and tricked himself.
- Sir Colville Young, Riding Haas: theatrical adaptation of a story featuring the trickster spider Anansi, who plays a clever trick on nemesis Braa Tiger to prove a point.
- Gladys Stuart, Dog and Iguana: Moral fable about the value of company.
- Shirley Warde, When My Father Comes Home: The absentee father of a youth sentenced to hang tries to reason with his mother about the circumstances leading to his death.
- George Gabb, Yellowtail: Philosophical story about four men trying to understand their roots.
- Evan X Hyde, Haad Time: Deals with the topic of teenage pregnancy from the eyes of a young Belize City couple.

=== Of Words: An Anthology of Belizean Poetry (1999) ===
Features poems by a number of Belizean authors, young and old, published and unpublished.

=== If Di Pin Neva Ben: Folktales and Legends of Belize (2001) ===
Covers folktales and mythological legends native to Belize and surrounding areas.

==== Contributors ====
- Mary Gomez Parham
- Dr. Timothy Hagerty
- Dr. Ervin Beck
- David Ruiz
- Jessie Castillo
- Elizabeth Cardenas
- Ines Sanchez
- Daviid Vansen
- Colin Bradley
- Willy A. Villalda
- Tata Balam

=== Memories, Dreams and Nightmares: A Short Story Anthology by Belizean Women Writers ===
==== Contributors ====
- Iris Abraham
- Sandra Crough
- Zee Edgell
- Helen Elliot Rocke
- Carol Fonseca
- Shannon Gillett
- Mary Gomez Parham
- Yvette Holland
- Ivory Kelly
- Lydia Loskot
- Myrna Manzanares
- Corinth Morter Lewis
- Ingrid Reneau.

==== Contributors ====
- Minerva Aponte-Jolly
- Jessie Nuñez Castillo
- Sandra Crough
- Holly Edgell
- Zee Edgell
- Zoila Ellis
- Kathy Esquivel
- Felicia Hernandez
- Yvette Holland
- Arifah Lightburn
- Myrna Manzanares
- Melba Marin-Velasquez
- Sylvia Nablo de Vasquez
- Natalie Williams
- Gorlee Marin
