= List of Belizean people =

This is a list of notable and well-known Belizean people, ordered alphabetically.

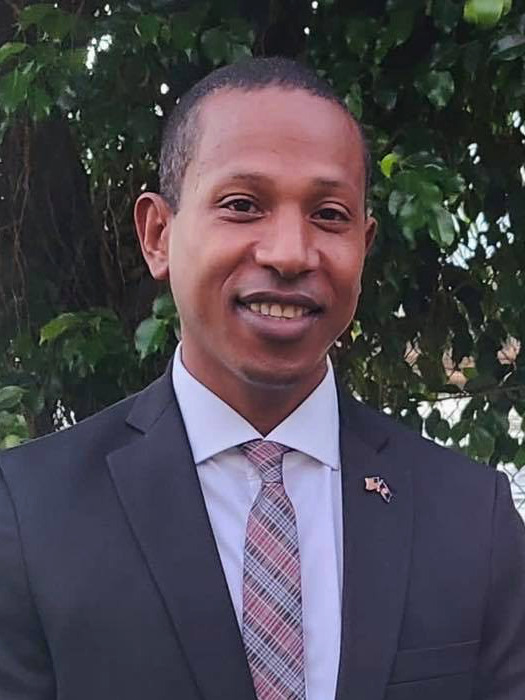
Shyne Barrow

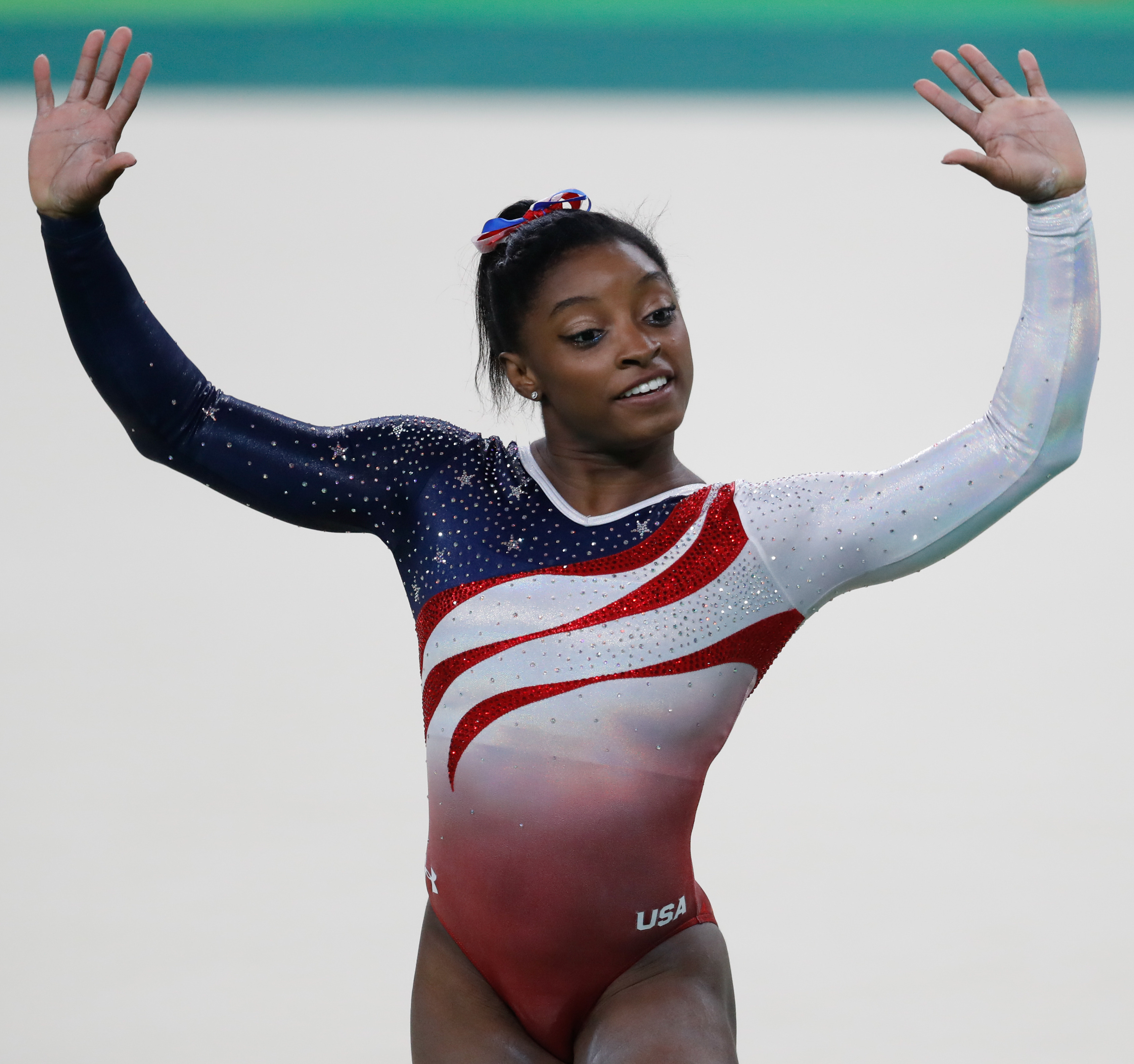
Simone Biles

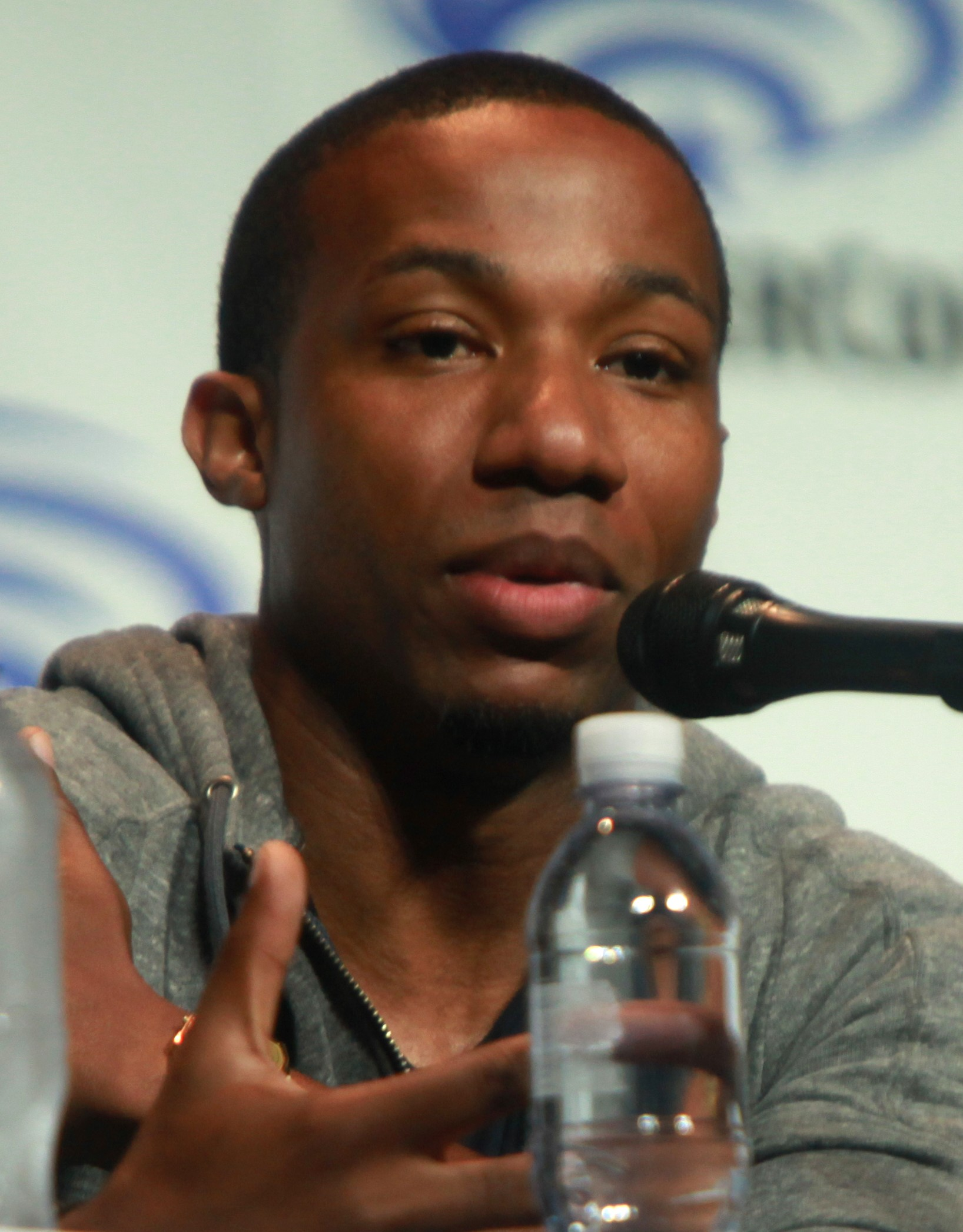
Arlen Escarpeta

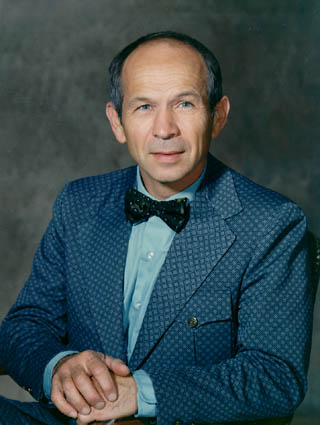
Maxime Faget

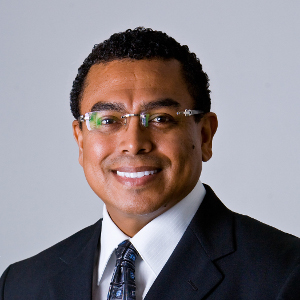
Arlie Petters

- Michael Anthony Ashcroft, international businessman, philanthropist and politician
- Dolores Balderamos-García, lawyer, activist politician and broadcaster
- Moses Michael Levi Barrow (born Jamal Michael Barrow; 1978), better known by his stage name Shyne, rapper and politician
- Simone Biles, American gymnast and Olympian
- Pi'erre Bourne, rapper and record producer
- Barry Bowen, bottling magnate, politician and entrepreneur
- Sharon Carr, murderer who killed a woman in Britain aged only 12
- Nadia Cattouse, actress, singer-songwriter
- Pen Cayetano, artist and musician
- Sue Courtenay, architect
- Ivan Duran, musician, and the founder and director of Stonetree Records
- Zee Edgell, novelist and educator, considered Belize's principal contemporary writer
- Arlen Escarpeta, actor, born in Belize; holds dual Belizean and American citizenship
- Maxime Faget, designer of the Mercury capsule
- Thea Garcia-Ramirez, women's rights activist and politician of the People’s United Party (PUP)
- Antonio Soberanis Gómez, activist in the Belizean labour movement, he founded the Labourers and Unemployed Association in 1934 to demand poverty relief work and a minimum wage. He was jailed for sedition in 1935
- Samuel Alfred Haynes, soldier, activist and poet
- Houston (of Belizean descent), R&B singer, best known for the hit single "I Like That"
- Marion Jones (holds dual-citizenship), former world champion track and field athlete, and a former professional basketball player for Tulsa Shock in the WNBA
- Emory King, historian, author, journalist and National Film Commissioner
- Chito Martínez, first Belizean player in the history of Major League Baseball (MLB)
- John McAfee, British-American computer programmer and founder of McAfee, Inc.
- Deon McCaulay, international footballer who last played for R.G. City Boys United in the Premier League of Belize
- Monrad Metzgen, national hero of Belize
- Andy Palacio, punta musician and government official. He was also a leading activist for the Garínagu and their culture
- Milton Palacio (holds dual-citizenship), Belizean American professional basketball player, currently with the Lithuanian team Lietuvos rytas
- Elijio Panti, traditional healer who used Mayan herbal medical techniques
- Wilfred Peters, accordionist and band leader, known as the "King of Brukdown"
- Arlie Petters, mathematical physicist, who is the currently the Provost of New York University Abu Dhabi. He was previously the Benjamin Powell Professor and Professor of Mathematics, Physics, and Business Administration at Duke University
- George Cadle Price, the first prime minister of Belize, considered to have been one of the principal architects of the country's independence
- Francis Reneau, pianist and composer. In 1994 he was commissioned by the government to produce a representative compilation of Belizean music
- Gerald Rhaburn, calypso, soca, reggae and brukdown musician
- Marie Sharp, entrepreneur
- Lisa Tucker (of Belizean descent), singer, musical theater and television actress
- Ann-Marie Williams, public policy advisor
- Selwyn Walford Young, musician and composer
- Destiny Wagner, Miss Earth 2021

== See also ==
- List of people by nationality
