= XTV (Belize) =

Television station in Belize City

- Belize City; Belize
- Channels: Analog: 15 (UHF)

Programming
- Affiliations: Independent

Ownership
- Owner: Kremandala Ltd.

History
- Founded: November 2004
- Former names: Krem Television

Links
- Website: XTV's website

XTV (formerly known as Krem Television) is a Belizean television station established in 2004 and serving Belize City.

Its manager is KREM Radio alumnus Evan "Mose" Hyde and it is part of Kremandala Ltd.

== Establishment ==
Since the late 1990s Kremandala Ltd., already holding portions of the newspaper and radio market in Belize, applied for a television license. The feud over the license dragged on for months; established media houses claimed Krem chairman Evan X Hyde was trying to corner the media market in Belize. Eventually KREM was granted license, and test broadcasts started in 2002.

== Test broadcasts ==
Test broadcasts were conducted in 2002 and 2003, on CBC Channel 3 in Belize City. Among the programs shown were live audio feeds of KREM FM programs, old semi-pro basketball games featuring company team the Kremandala Raiders and documentaries.

== XTV today ==
XTV came on the air in September 2004 as KREM Television, under the slogan "Show weself, see weself, be weself" (Kriol for "Showing Ourselves, Seeing Ourselves, Being Ourselves"). The slogan captures the idea of creativity and not being a slave to a certain format, something KREM has long championed. A Christmas program aired in December attracted modest viewership.

In 2005, most of KREM's primetime radio programs began to be aired by television, including The Kremandala Show, Women at Work and WUB Morning Vibes. Framed around these programs were international documentaries featuring African and African-American issues and occasionally sports.

In 2006, KREM added local dramatic series Noh Matta Wat!, teen show Teen Speakout and a show hosted by UDP politician and attorney Wilfred Elrington. The shows named above mark most of KREM TV's airtime.

XTV now airs a 16-hour schedule from Mondays to Saturdays and a truncated schedule on Sundays. It can be seen on UHF channel 15 in Belize City as well as on cable.

In March 2024, KREM Television was rebranded as XTV, named after Evan Hyde's alias.

== Original programming ==
- Sunday Review
- WUB Morning Vibes
- Evening News (premiered in 2014)
- Bad Ting Mek Laugh
