= Venise T. Berry =

American novelist

- Born: Kansas City, Kansas, U.S.
- Education: University of Iowa (BA, MA); University of Texas at Austin (PhD)
- Employer: University of Iowa
- Notable work: So Good
- Relatives: S. Torriano Berry (brother)
- Website: www.veniseberry.com

Venise T. Berry (born 1955) is an American novelist known for her novels about contemporary African-American relationships. With her brother S. Torriano Berry, she has also written several books on African-American cinema.

== Background ==
Venise Torriana Berry is the oldest of three children born to Virgil and Jean Berry. She received a BA in Journalism and an MA in Communication Studies from the University of Iowa. From the University of Texas at Austin, she received a Ph.D. in Radio, TV and Film.

== Career ==
An Associate Professor of Journalism and African American Studies at the University of Iowa in Iowa City, Iowa. Berry is the author of three national bestselling novels: So Good (1996), All of Me (2000) and Colored Sugar Water (2002). She is co-author with S. Torriano Berry of The 50 Most Influential Black Films (Citadel, 2001) and The Historical Dictionary of African American Cinema (Scarecrow Press, 2007).

== Awards and recognition ==
- 2001: Honor Book Award, Black Caucus of the American Library Association for All of Me
- 2001: Iowa Author Award, Public Library Foundation, Des Moines, Iowa
- 2003: Creative Contribution to Literature Award, Zora Neale Hurston Society

== See also ==
- Chick lit
- Women's literature
- African-American Literature
