= North Amerikkkan Blues =

1971 novel by Evan X Hyde

- Author: Evan X Hyde
- Language: English
- Genre: Autobiographical novel
- Publisher: Angelus Press
- Publication date: 1971 (original); 1995 (re-release in X-Communication)
- Publication place: Belize
- Media type: Print
- Pages: 90 pp

North Amerikkkan Blues, published in 1971, is the first novel from Belizean Evan X Hyde. It is an autobiographical tale of Hyde's time at Dartmouth College, an Ivy League school in Hanover, New Hampshire, United States, from which Hyde received a B.A. in English in 1968.

== Plot summary ==
Evan Anthony Hyde tells the story of his last few months at St. John's College Sixth Form (now Junior College) in which he receives a scholarship from the local embassy to study at Dartmouth. After enduring threats from a Jesuit teacher who dislikes Hyde and wants to take his scholarship away despite his academic performance, the eighteen-year-old leaves Belize for Dartmouth. While there, he makes new friends and learns much more than he would have wished about the world outside of Belize. After two years and many adventures, Hyde makes a decision that affects his life irrevocably.
