= John Alexander Watler =

- Born: 9 November 1938; Stann Creek District, Belize (British Honduras)
- Died: 23 December 2015 (aged 77); Baltimore, Maryland, USA
- Occupations: Novelist, master storyteller, poet, playwright and literary performer
- Writing career
- Period: 1995-2015

John Alexander Watler (6 November 1938 – 23 December 2015) was a Belizean novelist, master storyteller, poet, playwright and literary performer. He was born in Monkey River Village, Stann Creek District, Belize (British Honduras). Watler was regarded as a folk hero for his literary works that were geared towards keeping the Kriol Culture alive.

== Early career ==
Watler began writing compositions at the age of 13. His schoolmaster encouraged his talent by giving him private lessons in English and grammar. Walter went on to excel in both elementary school and high school. Seeing that his parents were unable to send him to University, he began looking for work. At the age of 18, he got his first writing job as a court reporter for The Belize Times. In 1958, he began submitting short stories to be aired on the British Honduras Broadcasting Service. Here his stories were read on the radio by Lawrence Vernon and Leo Bradley Senior. Later, the trio published an anthology of short stories by the name of, Among My Souvenirs .

After publishing the anthology of short stories, Watler submitted a copy of Among My Souvenirs to the Jamaican newspaper, The Daily Gleaner. He received an invitation from The Gleaner to study journalism for one year under a program for Caribbean writers at The Gleaner in-house. Upon his return to Belize from Jamaica, Watler worked as an acting editor for the Belize Billboard, a daily newspaper.

Watler received a diploma in journalism in 1995. In that same year, his short fiction, Bitter Sweet Revenge, was featured in the Belizean Writers Series in Snapshots of Belize: An Anthology of Belizean Short Fiction. Watler continued to write many engaging stories and poems. However, his first published novel, Cry Among Rainclouds debuted until Watler was in his 60s.

== Works ==
His published novels include:

- Cry Among Rainclouds (2001)
- De Works (2002)
- Sea Lotto (2004)
- Boss of Dangriga (2007)

Among his other published works are novels such as: Blue Hole, The Bomba Codex, The Banjuju Tribe, The Snake Doctor, Renaissance and Antics. He also published “Escape to Nomo Nomo” which is a lyrical folklore comedy and “Story of Belize City,” which is a historical, epic poem.

In addition to his many contributions to Belizean Literature, John Alexander Watler was also Master Storyteller, well known in Belizean theater for his lively one-man performances portraying folk characters such as Brer Anansi or some of his playwright creations, such as: “Wapye’s Letter”, “One Foot Was Pushed”, and ”Sunkutu’s UFO Experience.” These stories and energetic performances formed the basis for Watler's efforts to keep Kriol culture alive. Universities in the US, including Texas A&M, Marlborough College and Sterling College, had hosted John Alexander Watler as literary performer.

On September 8, 2005, Watler released an audio CD with three of his stories: an epic poem– "The Story of Belize City", a historic poem– “While They Fight I Write”, and an ecological poem– “The Grand Tour of Monkey River”.

Watler also served as an elder member of the American National Association of Black Storytellers (NABS) and served on their Scholar's Panel at their 2010 national convention in Minneapolis, MN. He was also a member of the International Storyteller's Association.

== Awards ==
Watler was the recipient of the Gold Medal Award in 1978 by National Festival of Arts: Historic Narrative as well as the National Poetry Contest Award in 1999 by National Institute of Cultural and History in Belize. He also received the Lifetime Achievement Award in 2011/2012, in Chicago, Illinois.

== See also ==
- John Watler Sea Lotto Interview
- John Alexander Watler Author of The Story of Belize
