= Edison Coleman =

Denburg Edison Clifford Coleman (January 8, 1931 – February 6, 1994) was a radio pioneer, comedian and journalist. He worked primarily with Radio Belize and is recognized as having brought that station to a position of prominence in the small Central American nation.

== Biography ==
Coleman was born in Benque Viejo del Carmen to descendants of Honduran immigrants from Isla Roatan. Having attended primary school in Benque Viejo and high school in Belize City, he had been involved in the nationalist movement on the labour front, working with George Price and the General Workers' Union in the 1950s.

He had also gotten a part-time job with Radio Belize as a temporary announcer. There, at first he had only been working in Spanish because his bosses thought he had not had the right accent for delivering an English-language newscast. However, he had received a certificate and a job as Labour Inspector but was fired a few months later after an altercation with a fellow employee. He fell back on his job at Radio Belize and within a decade had risen to become the voice of Belize, with a sometimes risque repartee of jokes and witticisms and a ready supply of listener approved music.

About this time he married childhood sweetheart Carmen "Panchita" Aguallo; they had one son, current broadcaster with Positive Vibes FM Gerard Coleman. He also had a step granddaughter, Susan Hernandez, whom he loved very much like his own blood granddaughter. He often let her speak over the radio and pick songs for the playlist. Coleman also frequently performed at the former Bliss Institute, now Center for the Performing Arts. He died in 1994, at Radio Belize's ebb in Belize City, Belize, prior to the station's demise in 1998.

== Radio style ==
Coleman was termed a perfectionist by some of his coworkers. But he always kept them- and listeners- on edge with his own brand of humor, much of it focused on unseen companion "Panchita", which many listeners thought represented his wife, though this was not the case. Among several bad habits was his lack of judgement with regard to time, some mornings barely making it to studios in downtown Belize City; and his rampant alcoholism, which only after several scares was repudiated in the late 1970s. Coleman succeeded because he represented the resiliency of Belizeans in the face of the many disasters affecting the nation as it struggled toward independence.
