= Edward Broaster =

Belizean police officer and writer

Edward Robert Broaster is a Belizean police officer and writer.

== Career ==
In 2005, while holding the rank of Assistant Superintendent, Broaster was assigned as Deputy Commander of the Patrol Branch. In September 2006 he was promoted to Superintendent. After the 2008 election, a conflict arose between Broaster and fellow officer Chester Williams with whom he had worked before, for example in 2007 on responding to Belize's first bomb threat against an outgoing flight. Media reporting on the relationship between the two officers added fuel to the fire by pointing out that Williams was an alleged People's United Party supporter who seemed to have lost favour due to Minister of Home Affairs Ralph Fonseca's fall from power, while Broaster was on the United Democratic Party's side and thus alleged to be the new administration's favourite. Broaster accused Williams of making threats on his life, and also accused him of having murdered a man who later turned out to be alive. He became the object of further political controversy in 2012 when a document he had written about internal affairs in the police department, known as "The Broaster Report", came to public attention.

Broaster is known for his work against gang violence. In 1995 he helped broker the Bird's Isle gang truce involving George McKenzie. He is the director of the Conscious Youth Development Program, an anti-crime initiative aimed at at-risk youth. In that capacity he brokered another gang truce in 2010 among Belize City gang leaders from Kraal Road, George Street, South Side Gangsters, Supaul Street, and Martins. In 2011 he represented Belize at the CARICOM's Fourth National Consultation on Youth Gangs and Gang Violence in Trinidad and Tobago. Under his leadership, CYDP youth summer camps added life skills training and anger management courses through cooperation with Restore Belize.

== Personal life ==
Broaster is a founding member and the treasurer of the Belizean Poets Society. In 2007, he released a book of short stories entitled All About Lawful Affairs!, tackling the tough subject of exploitation within romantic relationships.

== Works ==
- Broaster, Edward Robert (2003). Belizean poems from a grass root perspective. Brasta Productions. OCLC 63130972.
- Broaster, Edward Robert (2004). Belizean poems of exciting tales. Brasta Productions. OCLC 257363847.
- Broaster, Edward Robert (2007). All about lawful affairs!. Brasta Productions. OCLC 435967869.
