= Corinth Morter Lewis =

Belizean educator and poet

Corinth Irene Morter-Lewis is a Belizean educator and poet. She has served as the President of the University of Belize and as President of the Governing Board of International Institute of UNESCO for Higher Education in Latin America and the Caribbean.

== Biography ==
Corinth Irene Morter was born in Belize City, British Honduras, and received her primary education at Ebenezer School. She began her career as a clerical assistant for the Government of Belize and later studied to be a teacher. She completed university studies at the University of New Brunswick in Canada and graduated in 1980 with a master's degree from Ball State University in Muncie, Indiana. She then pursued a doctorate at the University of Alberta, where she earned her PhD in Psychology of Education. She began teaching at the Belize Technical High School, which later became the Belize Technical College, later becoming a department head and Vice-Principal there.

She served as the acting President of the University of Belize between 2010 and 2011, having previously served as its President from January 2003 to June 2007. In 2008, she began working as the President of the Governing Board of International Institute of UNESCO for Higher Education in Latin America and the Caribbean, having previously served as vice president.

== Personal life ==
Lewis was married to Charles Victor Lewis with two children (Charles Omari Lewis and Idolly Micere Lewis). She has 3 grandchildren (Shay, Conor and Davu). She writes poetry in her spare time and is a member of the Belizean poets society. Several of Lewis' poems and works were reproduced in the Belizean Writers Series.

== Selected works ==
- Morter-Lewis, Corinth (2001). Fathers of Belize. National Library Service. ISBN 978-976-8111-72-2.
- Morter-Lewis, Corinth (2002). "Moments in time". In Wilentz, Gay Alden; Abraham, Iris (eds.). Memories, Dreams and Nightmares: A Short Story Anthology by Belizean Women Writers. Cubola Productions. ISBN 978-976-8161-03-1.
- Morter-Lewis, Corinth (2004). Heritage: A Poem Read at the First Belize Black Summit, September 13-15, 2003 at the Biltmore Plaza Hotel, Belize City, Belize. University of Belize Press. ISBN 978-976-8111-89-0.
- Morter-Lewis, Corinth (2013). Moments in Time (two volumes). BRC Printing Ltd. ISBN 978-976-9-53581-7.
