= Knocking Our Own Ting =

Satirical pamphlet published by Belizean writer Evan X Hyde

Knocking Our Own Ting is a satirical pamphlet published by Belizean writer Evan X Hyde in 1969 discussing the Battle of St. George's Caye, a naval battle off the coast of Belize which occurred in 1798. The battle had been celebrated since 1898 on September 10 as St. George's Caye Day, with Hyde's work seeking to question the traditional celebration of the engagement.

== Synopsis ==
Hyde, already exposed to the theories Black Power movement, argued in the pamphlet that celebrating the Battle of St. George's Caye tended to divide Belizeans more than unify them. The combatants in the battle – white slavemasters (Baymen) and enslaved Blacks – were the ancestors and forefathers of the Belizean Creole people; while their Spanish opponents were the ancestors of the Mestizos in Central America after intermarrying with indigenous Central Americans. Hyde argued that the celebration of the efforts by both Blacks and whites to defeat the Spanish only served to alienate Mestizos who had emigrated to Belize. In Hyde's view, the holiday only served to increase divisions in Belizean society between whites, Blacks and Mestizos. Hyde also questioned the relevancy of the holiday in a multiracial and multiethnic Belize which was significantly different demographically to the region in 1798, when the battle was fought. He concluded that the only celebrations which should occur on September 10 was that of the efforts of the Black soldiers in the battle, rather than any national pride, given that Belize was still a colony.

== Publishing ==
Benex Press issued the first edition of Knocking Our Own Ting in 1969. It then went out of print until the publication of X-Communication by Angelus Press in 1995.
