= George Gabb =

Belizean artist (1928–2007)

- Born: February 28, 1928
- Died: March 1, 2007 (aged 79)
- Children: Elena, Antonio, Rupert, George, Jose, Deirdre

George Seymour Gabb M.B.E. (February 28, 1928 – March 1, 2007) was a Belizean artist, sculptor, writer and entertainer.

== Career ==
Gabb was born in Belize City and received no more than a primary school education. At age 13, he began to take up the arts and soon gained a following as a sculptor. Among his many creations are "The Sleeping Giant", a version of which is on the Belize $100 currency note, and the "Freedom of Thought" sculpture at the entrance to the city of Belmopan. He also had many other passions, and during his career he engaged in performance and entertainment, as well as writing poetry and plays. Some of his work in this area included "The Naked eye", a collection of poems and proverbs, and "Yellowtail", a play first performed in the 1960s. In 1974 he was awarded an M.B.E for his services by the British Empire.

== Family ==
Gabb had six children, Elena, Antonio, Rupert, George, Jose, and Deirdre. George was chair of the CIS department in the School of Computer and Engineering Technologies at Miami Dade College, North Campus in Miami, Florida. His son, Rupert, was a prominent architect in Belize, designing and building multiple luxury resorts in the island of San Pedro, Belize. He and his son Rupert also collaborated to create the Belmopan Regional Language Center Monument.

His niece, Margaret Gabb-McKenzie, was the first female Chief Magistrate of Belize.

== Works ==
- Gabb, George (1976). Ethnic Soul Song. Pioneer Playhouse.
- Gabb, George (1996). Naked Eye: Belizean Proverbs and Philosophy. Kriol Gyal Prodokshans. ISBN 9789768111043.
- Gabb, George (1996). Michael D. Phillips (ed.). Ping Wing Juk Me: Six Belizean Plays. Cubola Productions. ISBN 9789768142108.
- Gabb, George (2004). George Gabb, the Gifted Giant. Factory Books. p. 24. ISBN 9789768111920.
