= WUB Morning Vibes =

WUB Morning Vibes (Wake Up Belize) is a popular radio / TV show in Belize aired by Krem Television. It is a daily morning call-in talk show covering local issues and current affairs. The poet Kalilah Enriquez is a co-host on the show, along with KREM TV’s general manager, Evan "Mose" Hyde.

The show is frequently a vehicle for public statements on controversial subjects. For example, in April 2007 the show read a letter by councilor Wil Galvez that was highly critical of other Punta Gorda Town Councilors, causing a political storm. In October 2007, Foreign Affairs Minister Lisa Shoman gave a public undertaking on WUB Morning Vibes that the illegal Santa Rosa settlement of Guatemalans would be gone by year-end. In January 2010 a legal advisor of the Dean Barrow administration and an ex-Minister of Foreign Affairs used the show to criticize a statement by foreign affairs minister Wilfred Elrington calling Belize’s border with Guatemala “artificial”.

The show's co-host Evan Hyde has been the target of attack. In October 2007, he found that his car window had been smashed and an attempt made to burn it using Molotov cocktails.
