= Evan X Hyde =

Belizean writer, journalist, media executive and former politician

- Born: Evan Anthony Hyde; 30 April 1947 (age 79); Belize City, British Honduras (now Belize)
- Education: Dartmouth College
- Occupation: Publisher of Amandala (1969–present)
- Political party: People's United Party (1977); United Black Association for Development (1969–1974)

Evan Anthony Hyde (better known as Evan X Hyde; born 30 April 1947) is a Belizean writer, journalist, media executive and former politician. He publishes and writes for the nation's largest newspaper, Amandala, and oversees its subsidiaries, KREM Radio (formed in 1989) and XTV (formerly known as KREM Television) (formed in 2004).

Between 1969 and 1974, he headed the United Black Association for Development (UBAD), which demanded better conditions for Belize's black people and emphasized unity. He earned a B.A. in English from Dartmouth College.

== Early life and education ==
Hyde was born in Belize City to a large family led by his father, Charles B. Hyde, a public servant. He attended the Holy Redeemer Boys' School, prior to its amalgamation with a girls' school of the same name, and the all-male St John's College High School (SJC) in Belize City. Hyde particularly excelled at creative writing.

He was among the first students to attend the SJC Junior College in 1964 and 1965, before being granted a scholarship by the U.S. Embassy to study at Dartmouth College in Hanover, New Hampshire. He enrolled in September 1966 and graduated in June 1968 among the top students in his class.

== UBAD and entry into politics ==
Upon Hyde's return to Belize in 1968, the nation he had left behind two years prior was in turmoil due to the latest rejected proposal to end the Guatemalan claim. He took a job teaching at Belize Technical College and in the meantime attempted to link up with other young intellectuals to try to influence the course of Belizean development. Hyde had been exposed to the teachings of the early Black Power movement in the United States, particularly Stokely Carmichael and Malcolm X (who had recently been assassinated).

These early seeds bore fruit when, on New Years Day, 1969, Hyde participated in a protest at a local cinema against the Vietnam War film The Green Berets, starring John Wayne. The group he was a part of, the Ad Hoc Committee for the Truth About Vietnam, evolved into the United Black Association for Development (UBAD) and the People's Action Committee chaired by Assad Shoman and future Prime Minister Said Musa. Hyde helped formed UBAD in February and took over its presidency in March after initial leader Lionel Clarke faced charges of inappropriate conduct.

Hyde left Technical to devote his time to the movement, in addition to courting Audrey Scott, whom he would later marry. With her he had four children: Tifara, Eva, Rachel, and Evan "Mose" Hyde (DJ and manager of Krem Television). They later separated and Hyde had three more children with another woman, Claudette Coleman: Cordel (present Lake Independence representative and Deputy Prime Minister), as well as Vonetta (a lawyer currently residing in London) and Michael (manager of Krem Radio). Hyde also had a daughter Jacinta (present business manager of Amandala) with another woman. Hyde and his wife later reconciled. Hyde has several grandchildren.

Hyde published Knocking Our Own Ting, a satirical analysis of the Battle of St. George's Caye, in 1969; North Amerikkkan Blues in 1971, profiling his time at Dartmouth, and The Crowd Called UBAD in 1972, a complete history of the organization to that point. He also briefly taught at Wesley College, a high school in Belize City.

Hyde also participated in politics. As a UBAD member, he was one of the nine candidates running in coalition with the National Independence Party in 1971 Belize City Council elections, in which the coalition lost badly. Hyde ran for the Belize House as a UBAD candidate in the Belize City-based Collet constituency in 1974. Although he finished a distant third, Hyde was widely seen as a spoiler in the race as the outcome was decided by one vote. Hyde ran a second unsuccessful campaign for Belize City Council in 1977 as a People's United Party (PUP) candidate.

In 1973, a significant portion of UBAD voted to join the newly formed United Democratic Party. As party chair Hyde opposed this decision, a situation which directly led to UBAD's demise the following year.

== Post-UBAD ==
After the dissolution of UBAD in February 1974, Hyde turned to journalism, while publishing two other works: Feelings in 1975, consisting mainly of fiction pieces; and Poems of Passion, Patriotism and Protest, a poetry collaboration with Rowland Parks and Richard "Dickie" Bradley in 1981.

But, increasingly, Hyde found himself devoted to Amandala as editor and then publisher. His "From the Publisher" columns found a wide audience in discussion of current topics in Belize and African and Mayan history. In 1989, Hyde presided over the creation of KREM Radio and hosted one of its original shows, the Kremandala Show, on Monday nights (it is now on Tuesdays) at 7:30.

Hyde's three earliest works returned to print along with other non-fiction pieces and past editorials of the Amandala to 1991 in X-Communication, published by the Angelus Press in 1994. A few of Hyde's fictional works were reproduced in editions of the Belizean Writers Series later in the decade.

Hyde today is chair of the UBAD Educational Foundation, successor to UBAD, and owner of the Library of African and Indian Studies on Partridge Street.

== Publishing history ==
Fiction:

- Feelings, 1975
- Poems of Passion, Patriotism and Protest (with Rowland Parks and Dickie Bradley), 1981
- Snapshots of Belize (story "A Conscience for Christmas"; Belizean Writers Series)
- Ping Wing Juk Me (play "Haad Time"; Belizean Writers Series)
- Of Poems (several poems; Belizean Writers Series)

Non-Fiction:

- Knocking Our Own Ting (historical satire), 1969
- North Amerikkkan Blues (autobiography), 1971
- The Crowd Called UBAD: Story of A People's Movement (history), 1972
- Sports, Sin and Subversion (sports, history), 2008

== Sources ==
- Hyde, Evan X. X-Communication. Belize City, Belize: Angelus Press, 1995.
- Shoman, Assad. 13 Chapters of A History of Belize (Chapter 10, Different Drums). Belize City, Belize: Angelus Press, 1995.
