= S. Torriano Berry =

American film director

- Born: Steven Torriano Berry; January 3, 1958 (age 68); Kansas City, Kansas, U.S.
- Education: University of Iowa, ASU, UCLA
- Occupations: Film director, producer, screenwriter
- Years active: 1981–present
- Relatives: Venise T. Berry (sister)

Steven Torriano Berry is an American film producer, writer and director. He directed Noh Matta Wat!, the first Belizean dramatic television series, which first aired on November 28, 2005.

== Background and career ==
A native of Kansas City, Kansas, Berry was raised in Des Moines, Iowa. After receiving his Bachelor's degree at Arizona State University, he entered the Master's program at UCLA's prestigious film school. While at UCLA, Berry worked on numerous film and video projects including an award-winning short, Rich, in which he wrote, produced and directed as well as starred. On October 21, 2011, Rich was screened as part of a major film retrospective, "L.A. Rebellion:Creating a New Black Cinema," part of Pacific Standard Time:Art in L.A. 1945-1980.

Berry is currently an associate professor at Howard University in Washington, D.C., where he directed the Indie horror film, The Embalmer. It is considered one of the earliest examples of the "urban horror film." He is also the author of two books on black film.

Berry is a member of Omega Psi Phi fraternity.

His latest project is The Kusini Concept: The Pride and the Sabotage, a documentary about the making of the film Countdown at Kusini.

== Film credits ==
- Black Independent Showcase, WHMM-TV 32, Washington D.C.
- The Black Beyond Anthology Series
- The Light (half-hour TV movie), WPVI-TV 6, Philadelphia
- When It's Your Turn, WPVI Philadelphia
- The Embalmer
- Noh Matta Wat! (TV series), Belize (Channel 5/7/Krem Television)
- The Kusini Concept: The Pride and Sabotage (documentary)

== Awards and recognition ==
- 1983: 2nd Place, Black American Cinema Society Award for Rich
- 1985: Honorable Mention, Black American Cinema Society Award for In the Hole
- 1990: First Place, Black American Cinema Society Award for The Light
- Black Horror Movie Hall of Fame
