= The Kremandala Show =

- Genre: News: analysis, commentary, features, interviews, specials
- Running time: 120 min.
- Country of origin: Belize
- Home station: Krem Radio
- Hosted by: Various
- Created by: Evan X Hyde
- Original release: November, 1994 - December 9, 2008 – April 14, 2009 - present
- Website: KREM website

The Kremandala Show
- Created by: Evan X Hyde
- Starring: Evan X Hyde
- Country of origin: Belize

Production
- Running time: 2 hours

Original release
- Network: Krem Television
- Release: 2005 - December 9, 2008; April 14, 2009 - present

The Kremandala Show is a Belizean political commentary talk show airing on Krem Radio and Krem Television. It premiered in 1994 on radio and 2005 on television and was hosted by KREM founder Evan X Hyde.

== Format ==
Hyde is joined weekly by four panelists to discuss current issues in Belize. The four official panelists as of January 2008 are Bill Lindo, Cedric Flowers, Henry Gordon and Rufus X.

After three rounds of often furious debate and discussion, occasionally punctuated by questions from moderator Hyde, the last segment of the show, called "The Parting Shot", presents the final opportunity for panelists to share their final thoughts for the week.

== Broadcast history ==
The Kremandala show premiered in late 1994 on Krem Radio, airing on Monday nights. Joining Hyde, Rufus and Lindo on the original program were physician Leroy Taegar and preacher Henry Gordon. The show aired at 7:30 PM CST, a constant ever since. In about 1998 or 1999, several changes were made: Taegar and Gordon left in favour of accountant Cedric Flowers and engineer and member of the UDP Ambrose Tillett, later made a Senator. The show also moved to Tuesday nights in a swap with a similarly themed program, Women at Work.

The program transitioned to television in 2005 on Hyde's newly created Krem Television. But the program has entered another spate of instability, beginning with the loss of Tillett and then Lindo (on some nights the show had only three panelists beside Hyde). Lindo's departure came after a threat of litigation from Opposition Leader Dean Barrow over comments Lindo made on a recent Kremandala Show. The major political parties, according to Hyde, have trouble with the show's free-thinking aspect. Independent Patrick Rogers joined after Tillett's departure but announced his own in June 2007 to pursue elected politics with Vision Inspired by the People (VIP).

Lindo has returned to the program as of December 11, 2007, the last episode of the 2007 season. Henry Gordon has returned to the show as a fill-in and later a semi-permanent fixture later in the 2007 season.

=== Post-program attack on Rufus X ===
Late on Tuesday October 2, panelist Rufus X was attacked upon arriving home from the program. The unknown assailant whacked Rufus in the side repeatedly until Rufus barred him with the gate of his yard. A defiant Rufus X appeared on both local news programs to insist that the attacks were "politically motivated", but both major political parties condemned the attacks vociferously, the Opposition UDP pointing the finger at the ruling PUP for supposedly encouraging the attack, the PUP pointing right back by claiming the incident was typical UDP behaviour. Prime Minister Said Musa, in an unrelated interview, obliquely blamed local media houses for giving Belize bad press internationally and seemed to implicitly condone the attacks. The attacks were loudly condemned by the newly formed Independent Media Association, of which Kremandala is a part, third parties, the Chamber of Commerce and others.

- Amandala editorial with Godfather references
- Amandala's Charles X on the attacks
- Second Amandala editorial
- Amandala's Frankie Rhys on the attacks

== Cancellation and reappearance ==
In a statement aired during the midday news on Krem Radio on January 5, 2009, Hyde announced that the show would not return for a fourth television season and fifteenth radio season.

However, the show returned on April 14 with the following lineup: Evan X Hyde, Bill Lindo, former Ombudsman Paul Rodriguez, Patrick Rogers and Senator Henry Gordon.
