= The Reporter (Belize) =

Belizean weekly newspaper

- Front page of the February 12, 2017 edition
- Type: Weekly newspaper
- Format: Tabloid
- Owner: The Reporter Press
- Editor: Dyon Elliott
- Founded: 1967
- Headquarters: Cor. West and Allenby Streets, Belize City, Belize, Central America
- Circulation: about 40,000

The Reporter is one of the chief newspapers of Belize. It was established in 1967 by publisher Harry Lawrence, who has authored every issue since. It is published weekly and sells for BZ $1.00. The Reporter's tagline is "Independently Serving Belize since 1967."

== Staff ==
- Publisher: Harry Lawrence
- Office Manager and Financial Controller: Rosa Maria Lawrence
- General manager: Lisbeth Ayuso
- Editor: Dyon A. Elliott
- Freelance Writer: William Ysaguirre
- Desktop Publisher: Jackie Fuller
- Lithographer: Pastor Novelo
- Staff Reporters/Writers: Michelle Sutherland and Britney Gordon
- Accounts/Advertising: Rodolfo Castro

== History ==
The Reporter began as a Belize Chamber of Commerce newsletter in 1967. The founding editor was Zee Edgell who had just returned from England with a diploma in journalism. It featured local news, business reports and other information on Belize. For most of the 1970s (and ever since), its main competitor has been the Amandala, established two years later.

Lawrence was involved in the formation of the UDP in 1974 and ran for municipal elections in 1974 and 1977 under its banner. He won, and the Reporter has been identified as a pro-UDP newspaper ever since.

The Reporter was one of the three newspapers sued in 1982 by then prime minister George Price over a controversial article about drug cultivation. The Reporter was fined for its actions in this regard along with the Amandala, but the third newspaper The Beacon's case was never heard. (The Beacon is a forerunner of today's Guardian.)

The 1990s saw the arrival of Meb Cutlack and Karla Vernon, both insightful analysts, and news editor and veteran media personality Anne Marie Williams. The Reporter also began featuring articles on the environment and culture and literature. Both Cutlack and Vernon have now left the newspaper.

The Reporter today is an amalgamation of these cumulative effects. Its reporting has been described as the least partisan and most accurate, and observers of Belize should note that it and the Amandala together offer the best view on Belize.

=== Publishing of Noticias ===
Beginning in December 2006, The Reporter began publishing a Spanish-language newspaper called Noticias (News). According to publisher Harry Lawrence, Noticias is separately managed but publishes at the Reporter Press.

Official website: https://www.thereporter.bz/
