= Dan Man =

Belizean entertainer

Dan Man is the stage name of Belizean entertainer Allison Hemsley. Hemsley (born 1973 in Belize City) is a local musician and rapper and actor. He received national attention after starring in the television series Noh Matta Wat!.
