= Amandala =

Belizean tabloid newspaper

- Front page of the February 7, 2017, edition
- Type: Twice-weekly newspaper
- Format: Tabloid
- Owner: Kremandala Ltd. (Amandala Press)
- Publisher: Evan X Hyde
- Editor: Marco Lopez
- Founded: 13 August 1969
- Political alignment: None (formerly United Black Association for Development)
- Headquarters: 3304 Partridge Street, P.O. Box 15, Belize City, Belize, Central America
- Circulation: about 40,000
- Website: Amandala.com.bz

Amandala is a Belizean tabloid newspaper. Published twice weekly, it is Belize's largest newspaper. Amandala was established in 1969 as the print organ of the now-defunct United Black Association for Development (UBAD), but has been politically independent since the mid-1970s. Its offices are located at 3304 Partridge Street in Belize City.

As of 2017, it has published over 3000 issues.

== The name ==
The name "Amandala" is adapted from the Xhosa/Zulu word "amandla", which means "power". Editors felt that Belizeans might mispronounce the word, so they added an extra "a" after the "d". Amandala editors often like to say the word means "power to the people", although the correct term for that is "Amandla, Ngawethu". The phrase occurs in English throughout the newspaper, most often in the Editorial and in publisher Evan X Hyde's column; however, it may appear in advertisements in the original African language.

== History ==
=== Establishment ===
Amandala began as a stenciled spreadsheet given out by members and supporters of UBAD in the streets of Belize City. After the third issue was published, UBAD officials decided to begin selling the paper for five cents a copy. The newspaper was published on Thursdays and dated and sold on Fridays. The first publisher and editor of the newspaper was Ismail Shabazz, a Muslim and member of UBAD; Hyde, the eventual publisher of the newspaper, was at times also an editor.

Many of the newspaper's first issues were dedicated to promoting the affairs of its parent organization, advertising meetings, celebrations and protests, and containing articles on topics considered important to Belizeans as well as criticism of the ruling People's United Party and its leader, George Price.

The first issue claimed of the new newspaper's intentions: "We don't know too much about this newspaper thing... We'll do the jerk, we'll do the fly... who bex, bex. Who bex fus, lose."

=== The RAM merger ===
In October 1969, UBAD merged forces with a similar movement, the People's Action Committee (PAC) chaired by Assad Shoman and Said Musa. Their newspaper, FIRE, joined Amandala to create "Amandala with FIRE", and this was the newspaper's masthead for the rest of 1969 and into January 1970, when RAM dissolved. Thereafter, Amandala reverted to its original name.

==== "Games Old People Play" ====
In the Amandala of February 20, 1970, the newspaper ran an article slandering an election petition heard and dismissed in the Supreme Court after General Elections on December 5, 1969, won by the PUP. The full text of the article follows here:

"Games Old People Play"
Election Petition
Starring: Clifford De Lisle Innis
D.B. Courtenay
Edward Laing (International)
Theodore Warrior
Agapito Hassock, other famous lip professors and cast of yeri-so PUP and NIP fanatics.
See: The rats of Charley Cadle Price
See: The bald white dome of S. Hulse
Thrill to the Dramatic Ending:
Dismissal of the Case.
UBADRAM advice to the cast of children: After this, let's play Mommy and Daddy: Hee, Hee.

A none too pleased PUP administration accused UBAD president Hyde and publisher Shabazz with sedition for the text of the article, which they claimed "meant that the administration of justice was a farce and that ... (those) who participated in it were participants in a childish game of amusements". (Shoman, 13 Chapters)

The case went to trial in June 1970, with former colleagues Shoman and Musa representing Hyde and Shabazz. For the next month, the fate of Amandala and UBAD hung in the balance as Attorney General V.H. Courtenay tried to prove that the Amandala had in fact committed sedition by lampooning the event and the defendants tried to exonerate themselves and improve the credibility of the fledgling newspaper. Shoman, perhaps showing some partiality, calls it the "most exciting trial in Belizean history", right down to the verdict, delivered on July 7, 1970, and clearing Hyde and Shabazz.

=== The 1970s: rockbottom and revival ===
A relieved Amandala staff began making moves to develop the newspaper's technology. First, in 1971, Amandala purchased a Chandler and Price letter press to replace the Gestetner stencils used on the paper to that point. This technology lasted, with many trials and errors, to 1977, when it was shelved in favor of modern offset technology being favoured by competitors such as The Reporter and The Belize Times. Despite ravages from Hurricane Greta-Olivia, Amandala became the nation's leading newspaper by 1981 due in part to using offset printing.

Parent organization UBAD soon crumbled around Amandala as formerly faithful members went their own way: some to the U.S., some to England, some to the newly formed UDP and some elsewhere. It remained for UBAD to be permanently dissolved, and the occasion came after Evan X Hyde's loss at the polls in elections of October 30, 1974. In the Amandala of November 8, 1974, Hyde formally ended UBAD, quoting Frank Sinatra and explaining why the time had come for the Association to be shut down. But Amandala, he said, would move in the direction of being a "community newspaper" rather than a political one.

For the remainder of the 1970s, Amandala tried to avoid controversy. Indeed, editor Hyde ran unsuccessfully for the PUP in City Council elections of 1977, and the paper generally toed the line with government policy, although reserving its usual candor for certain situations. Joining the paper in this period was the "Ros'lin" serial about Belizean adolescents, a special "Jumble" word puzzle, columns by the publisher's father Charles B. Hyde and "The Old Man", a forerunner of today's "Smokey Joe" column.

=== The 1980s: becoming mainstream ===
As Amandala entered the 1980s, it had updated its technology, expanded its scope of writing and was reaching more people. The often impassioned editorials of the UBAD era were replaced by more mainstream content.

Amandala became more well known when it covered the 1981 Heads of Agreement uprisings. Toward the end of 1981, it published an article linking Prime Minister Price and Minister Louis Sylvester to a report from Mexico about drugs in Belize. For the second time in its publishing life, Amandala went to court because it was accused of libel in a lawsuit. Judgements of BZ $10,000 and BZ $7,500 were imposed against the paper in 1982 and 1983. The newspaper went into debt but continued publishing. Relief arrived briefly with the ascension of the UDP to power in 1984, but the UDP and Amandala soon found themselves at loggerheads.

Popular columns during this period included "Far and Near" (before it moved to the Belize Times), "Bill Williamson" (before it moved to The Reporter as "Roving Eye") and "Smokey Joe" (the first appearance).

=== The 1990s: maintaining dominance ===
The 1990s for Amandala really began on November 17, 1989, with the establishment of Belize's first commercial radio station, KREM FM, on the compound at Partridge Street. Amandala dedicated much of the next three years to weaning the young radio station and protecting it from its rivals, the now defunct Radio Belize and LOVE FM. UBAD celebrated what would have been its twenty-second anniversary in 1991, and Amandala publisher and former UBAD president Hyde wrote a reminiscence of the UBAD glory days in the "From the Publisher" column of February 8, 1991. In addition, Amandala became the chief sponsor for local semi-professional team "The Raiders", which would win five national titles in the 1990s out of a total of seven. Through KREM and the Raiders, Amandala's name remained well-known. However, it did not escape criticisms of partisanship from rivals including the defunct People's Pulse, which derided all things Amandala for much of the 1990s until its closure in 1998, its sponsor the UDP being in power for much of that period. Amandala eventually admitted to a partnership with the then-Opposition PUP established in 1994 and dissolved ten years later. There was also a claim of sensationalism, bias and overhyping of events ascribed to the newspaper. Things got so bad there was an attempt by foreign nationals to buy out the newspaper that was only turned down at the last minute, and KREM Radio even briefly shut down. Despite Amandala's troubles, Belizeans faithfully bought the paper, which by this time dated its weekend issue for Sunday instead of Friday.

Popular columns included Evan "Mose" Hyde's entertainment column "Chat Bout", educator and activist Silvana Woods "Weh A Gat Fi Seh" (What I Have to Say), Belize's first column written entirely in Belize Creole (prior to its moving to The Reporter), and Los Angeles-based Pam Reyes' "Caribbean Pulse", in addition to Glenn Tillett's "Between the Lines" and Russell Vellos' "Viewpoint".

== Amandala today ==
The newspaper is a mix of editorial opinion and journalism.

=== News coverage ===
Amandala is noted for sensational stories about violent crime. It is significantly more likely to publish such crime stories than The Reporter, a competing newspaper, based on a random sampling of stories from both papers by a scholar at the Rochester Institute of Technology spanning 2010 to 2014.

=== Editorial positions ===
Amandala is strongly opposed to LGBT rights in Belize. The paper's editorial staff complains of a "gay agenda" that wants to legalize "public displays of their lifestyle, same-sex marriage, and worse." The paper has editorialized against Caleb Orozco and his LGBT rights organization, UNIBAM. Editor-in-chief Russell Vellos has written that he considers homosexuality to be "evil."

=== Current staff ===
- Publisher: Evan X Hyde
- Editor in chief: Russell Vellos
- Assistant editor: Adele Ramos
- Lithographer: Cassian Glenn, Roy Lord
- Layout/design: Victoria Tun, Deshawn Swasey
- Business manager: Jacinta Hyde
- Office secretary/Receptionist: Odessa Robinson
- Collation manager: Jason Barrera

=== Columns ===
- Charles Hyde's "Ideas and Opinions", under the name Janus, taking a scholarly look at Belize today;
- Novelist Colin Hyde's short takes on current topics with humorous dialogue;
- In Search of Truth, by Henry Gordon, combining discussion of current events with sermons from the Bible (Gordon is a pastor).
- Press Predictions (by Gilroy "Press" Cadogan, moved from Belize Times)
- Clinton Uh Luna (firebrand from Corozal)

=== Pricing ===
- Midweek edition (published Tuesdays, dated Wednesdays): BZ $1.00
- Weekend edition (published Thurs./Fri., dated Sundays): BZ $1.35

=== Website ===
Amandala has maintained an online presence since the early 2000s. It was previously a tenant of Belizemall.com before establishing its own address. This address, amandala.com.bz, was revamped in 2006.

== Recent developments ==
There has been discussion about a possible Spanish-language version of the paper; however, this has yet to be detailed. Amandala moved closer to endorsing a Spanish-language version of its newspaper in a recent editorial which explained what a Spanish-language Amandala would have to overcome in order to achieve success. In a more recent "From the Publisher", Hyde reported that the project was on hold.

Beginning in February 2010, the Editorial and From the Publisher columns appear in Spanish on separate pages from their English counterparts.

In the issue for October 22, 2006, Colin Hyde appeared to be closing his column "Sixes and Sevens", saying he would move on to other projects, including new novels, but that he would continue contributing to the Amandala. Hyde has since written numerous letters and occasional short columns dedicated to sport and politics. In October 2007, Hyde joined the paper for a brief period as assistant editor, during Adele Ramos' maternity leave, and reverted to his old post on her return in January 2008.

=== Barrow and Williams lawsuits ===
In April 2007, attorney and then leader of the opposition Dean Barrow wrote Amandala requesting payment on a loan accruing to some $262,000 procured from Sagis Investments, a company apparently owned by Lord Michael Ashcroft. Amandala is insisting that the move is an attempt to destabilize KREM in an election year and that the major political parties may be complicit in this attack.

Less than a week later on The Kremandala Show of April 24, panelist Bill Lindo, a supporter of the ruling People's United Party, claimed that Opposition leader Barrow in his capacity as chief litigator for the Belize Bank drafted an unlimited guarantee for the Government of Belize concerning a loan of $33 million to a consortium of investors for Universal Health Services, a local private hospital which is currently insolvent. Barrow had previously denied this accusation and wrote the Amandala within 24 hours of the statement to announce legal action against Bill Lindo for defamation of character, though he proposed to ignore Kremandala as an equally guilty partner (given that they hosted Lindo) because there was no evidence of a prior conspiracy. Lindo subsequently left the program, but has returned as of December 11, 2007, its last episode of the year. No mention has since been made of the lawsuit.

The Sagis case went to court in May 2008 and Chief Justice Dr. Abdulai Conteh ruled in KREM Radio's favor (see that article for details).

However, recent events led Amandala to change their tune. In May and June 2007 Belizeans rose up in protest over the unilateral signing of a loan note by the Government and Michael Ashcroft's Belize Bank over a 33 million dollar arrangement with the struggling Universal Health Services. That matter is currently on standstill, but the PUP has fallen out of favor with Kremandala, or vice versa, as explained by Hyde in a recent "From the Publisher".
