= Evan "Mose" Hyde =

Evan Anniko "Mose" Hyde is a Belizean television executive and talk show host. He is one of eight children for KREM patriarch Evan X Hyde. He has been with local media powerhouse Kremandala Ltd. since its inception and has worked for all three branches: Amandala, KREM FM and Krem Television. In addition to his duties as executive producer and host of Krem Radio/Television's morning talk show Wake Up Belize (WUB) morning vibe, he is a part-time DJ and one-third of local studio system The Dignitaries. Mr "Mose" Hyde currently hosts his morning show with Sharon Marin. Together they create an inviting atmosphere for Belizeans to call into the show and give their input about past and current occurrences.

Evan Hyde has been the target of attack. In October 2007 he found that his car window had been smashed and an attempt made to burn it using Molotov cocktails.
