= Myrna Manzanares =

Belizean writer and activist (1946–2021)

Myrna Manzanares MBE
- Born: 30 October 1946; Gales Point, Belize District, British Honduras
- Died: 21 December 2021 (aged 75); Belize City, Belize

Myrna Kaye Manzanares MBE (30 October 1946 – 21 December 2021) was a Belizean writer and activist, considered an ambassador of Belizean Creole culture. She worked to preserve this culture, particularly the Creole language, and advocated for racial justice both in Belize and among its diaspora.

== Early life and California years ==
Myrna Manzanares was born in Gales Point, a small village in Belize District, British Honduras, on 30 October 1946. Her mother was the town's craft instructress. At age 8, she left her home village to attend St. John’s Anglican Primary School in Belize City.

She moved to the U.S. state of California in 1965 to join family who had already left after Hurricane Hattie. She obtained a degree in psychology at Pepperdine University, as well as taking English as a second language classes at the University of Southern California. She completed postgraduate studies in psychology at California State University, Long Beach.

During her time in California, Manzanares became deeply involved in the Belizean diaspora community of Los Angeles, which she was active in organizing.

== Activism and career ==
Manzanares returned to Belize in 1986 and became involved in community organizing there, including through the now-defunct PRIDE Belize.

She was a longtime activist and organizer around black identity and Belizean Creole (Kriol).

In 1995, she co-founded the National Kriol Council, which aims to promote the culture and language of Belizean Creole people. She was also a longtime president of the institution.

Her cultural activism included extensive oral history work. Manzanares also fought for women's rights and sexual and reproductive health, as well as for substance abuse prevention and against HIV/AIDS, serving as chair of the National AIDS Task Force and president of the Addiction Alert Rehabilitation Center. She was also involved with the Belize History Association and the Belize National Library Service Board, and she was politically involved in the United Democratic Party, including an unsuccessful run for the Belize City Council in 1999.

Manzanares worked for Peace Corps Belize, the Belize Teachers College, and the University of Belize. She was appointed a Justice of the Peace.

== Writing ==
Manzanares wrote poetry, prose, and nonfiction. Her work was included in both Volumes I and II of Memories, Dreams and Nightmares, an anthology of short stories by Belizean women writers published by the Belizean Writers Series.

She contributed to Tek Mi! Noh Tek Mi!, a collection of Caribbean folktales, and edited Kriol language materials and journals. She took part in creating the dictionary of Kriol and translating the Bible into Kriol.

Her other published works include Tell Me a Story (folklore); Life Lines (poetry); Traditional Games of Belize (compiled for UNICEF); Faith-Based Response to HIV and AIDS; and Healing Circle, a 2017 poetry collection in collaboration with teenager Azizi Hoy.

== Personal life and recognition ==
In 2008, she was honoured as a Member of the Order of the British Empire "for services to education, culture and social development." The same year, she was honored in Belize's Outstanding Women Awards.

In 2018, she was named one of the first-ever Artists Emeritus by Belize's National Institute of Culture and History.

Manzanares had two children, a daughter, Shalini, and a son, Robert. She was admitted to Karl Heusner Memorial Hospital on 15 December 2021 with a suspected stroke and died several days later on 21 December at the age of 75.
