= Radio Belize =

Former public radio station of Belize

The Broadcasting Corporation of Belize, otherwise known as Radio Belize (using the call-sign of VPM; no relation to the current VPM-FM), was a radio station in Belize that shut down in November 1998. Until the 1980s, it was Belize's only radio station.

== Beginnings ==
The BCB began as the British Honduras Broadcasting Service, modeled on the home country's British Broadcasting Corporation (BBC). Amandala columnist Selvin "Smokey Joe" Wade remembers the station by its original callsign, ZIK 2, with which it signed on in the 1930s. At this stage it played mainly music from abroad. With the rise of the nationalist movement efforts were made to bring the BHBS closer to Belizean identity and it assumed the name Radio Belize.

== The Sefe Coleman era ==
Edison Denburg Clifford Coleman, better known to Belizeans as "Sefe", entered the radio business in the 1960s and completely revolutionized radio in Belize. He was very popular and funny and was Belize's foremost comedian. Coleman was a mainstay of Radio Belize through the 1980s until his death in 1994. Son Gerard Coleman has followed him into the radio business at LOVE FM and Positive Vibes. During this time Radio Belize was considered the official voice of the ruling People's United Party.

Radio Belize entertained Belizeans with a variety of music. In that era television broadcasting was unavailable in Belize, so the population was dependent on the only radio station in the country for entertainment and news. Popular programs from the BBC stable included "Portia Faces Life", and Doctor Paul which were aired daily and nightly.

== The Belize Radio One experiment and brand extension ==
With the accession of the UDP in 1984, Radio Belize began to experiment with being more of a culture-oriented station rather than simply playing music. Now known as Belize Radio One, it mixed contemporary music with chatter from local radio personalities: Debbie Tillett, Mike Nicholson, Rudy Aguilar, Andy Palacio, Paul Mahung, and in the 1990s, Silvana Woods, Clover Broderick and Brian Mossiah. But the revamped Belize Radio One, even with a new television wing, still found trouble holding its own against the all-music format of KREM Radio, established in 1989. The government first tried privatizing the BCB and then extending its brand to include an all-music station named Friends FM, but with the proliferation of radio stations in Belize and an increase in technology, the BCB was rapidly becoming obsolete. General Manager Rene Villanueva Sr. resigned in 1992 after helming the BCB for two years and working there for 23.

== Limping to the finish line ==
As it entered its last decade the BCB seemed anachronistic compared to other local stations. While still owning some of the best equipment in Belizean radio at that time, it could not handle the introduction of competitive and new formats of radio. All that remained was to shut it down, and after one last act of service—informing the nation of the progress of 1998's Hurricane Mitch—DJ Neil Hall (and, according to Villanueva, himself and Patrick Jones) shut down at noon Central Standard Time (18:00 G.M.T.) on 30 November 1998. The equipment was bidded out and purchased by LOVE FM and KREM Radio, respectively. While the BCB itself is defunct, former employees are still to be found on the Belizean airwaves, working for other stations. LOVE FM is unique in this respect; former BCB manager Villanueva now owns and operates that station and Mossiah, Terry Gordon, Ruben Morales Iglesias and some other veterans work there. Mike Nicholson worked for FM 2000 and now for Positive Vibes FM. In this way, the BCB remains, as its slogan says, "The Voice of Belize."

== Frequencies ==
=== Radio Belize ===
- Ladyville, Belize District: AM 834 kHz (shifted to 830 in the early 1980s), FM 91.1 MHz.
- Punta Gorda, Toledo District: FM 88.3 MHz
- International: shortwave radio (90 m "tropical band") 3.285 MHz

=== Friends FM ===
(all frequencies in MHz)

- Belize City, Belize District: 91.3
- Independence, Stann Creek District: 94.7
- Ladyville, Belize District: 88.9

== Reference and external links ==
- Article originally written by Don Moore in the January 1989 Monitoring Times with a 1996 addendum
- Channel 5's G. Michael Reid on losing the BCB
- Radio World's frequency listings for Belize
