= Belizeans =

People of Belize

Beliceños (Spanish); Bileezian pipl (Kriol)
- Flag of Belize

Total population
- Belize 415,789

Regions with significant populations
- United States: 42,970
- Canada: 2,146
- Mexico: 2,127
- United Kingdom: 1,694
- Bolivia: 1,007
- Guatemala: 984
- Taiwan: 384
- Honduras: 372
- El Salvador: 344
- Costa Rica: 167
- Panama: 103
- Australia: 85
- Switzerland: 46
- Bahamas: 45
- Spain: 44
- Italy: 38 – 13 (2024)
- Netherlands: 25
- Nicaragua: 24 – 54
- Barbados: 21 – 33
- Venezuela: 18
- Norway: 13
- Sweden: 13
- Antigua and Barbuda: 13
- Belgium: 12
- Austria: 9
- France: 8 – 50
- Jamaica: 7 – 200
- Argentina: 6
- Denmark: 6
- Brazil: 5
- Romania: 3

Languages
- English (Official) Widely spoken: Spanish, Kriol and Spanglish Minority: Mayan languages, Garifuna, German, Chinese, and Spanglish

Religion
- Christianity (Predominantly Protestants and Catholics), and minority Buddhist, Hindus, Muslims, Rastafarians, Baháʼís and Maya religion

Related ethnic groups
- Belizean Mestizos, Belizean Creoles, Garinagu, Mayas, Belizean Mennonites, Jamaicans, Mexicans, Guatemalans, Hondurans, Nicaraguans

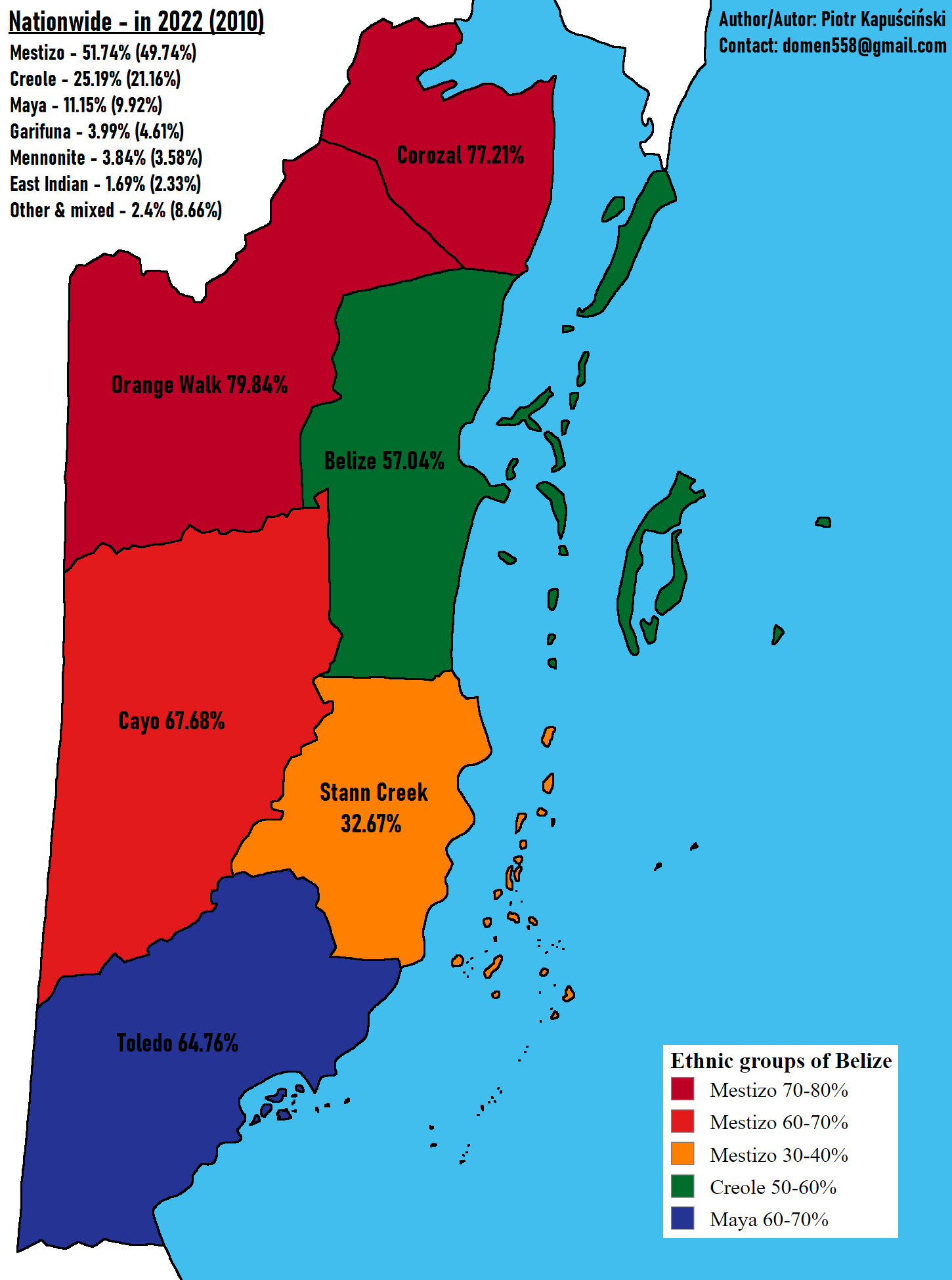
Distribution of ethnic groups in Belize according to the 2022 census

Belizeans are people associated with the country of Belize through citizenship or descent. Belize is a multiethnic country with residents of Amerindian, African, European, Asian and Middle-eastern descent or mixed-race with any combination of those groups.

Colonisation, slavery, and immigration have played major roles in affecting the ethnic composition of the population and as a result, Belize is a country with numerous cultures, languages, and ethnic groups.

== Maya and early settlers ==
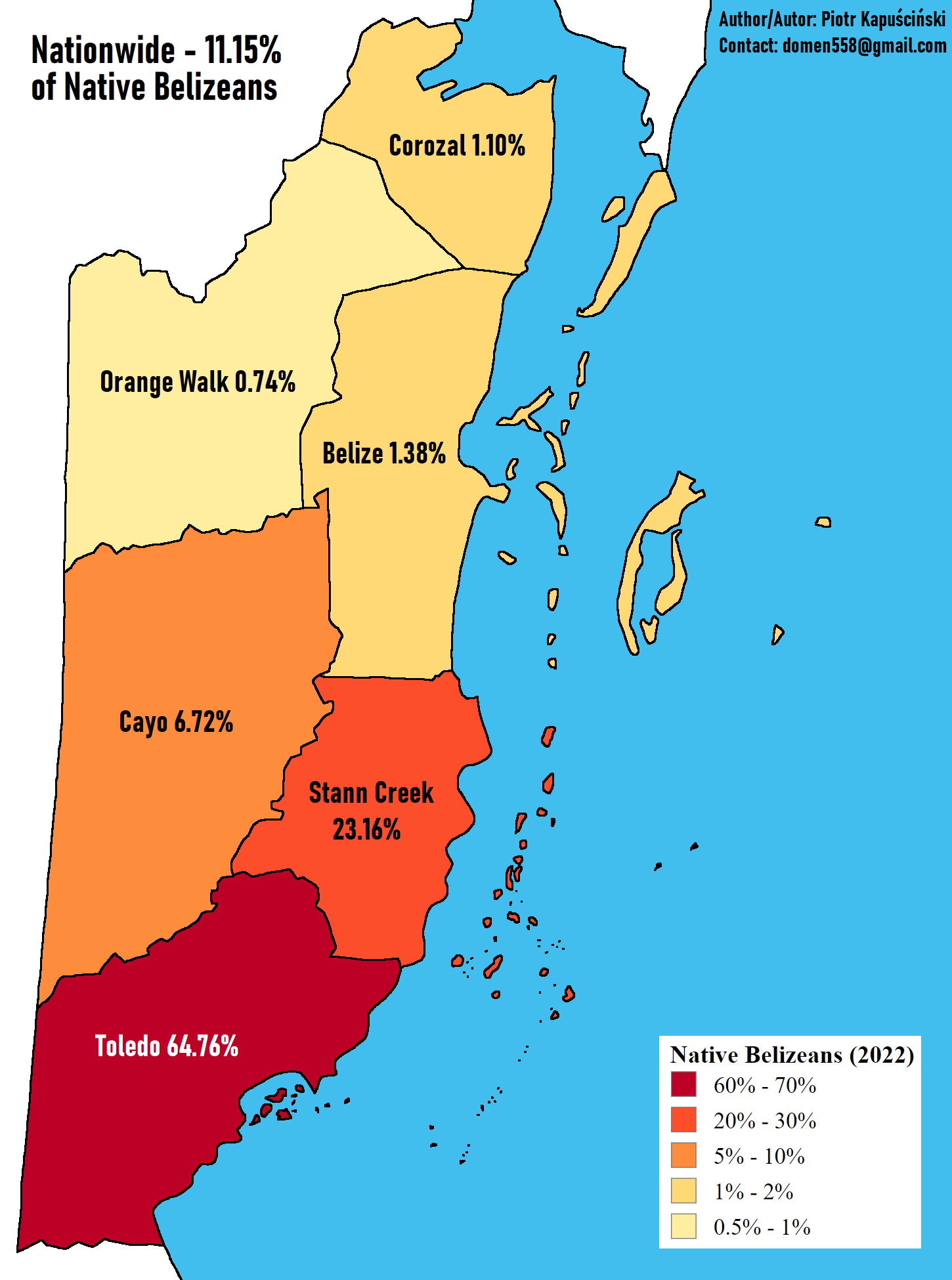
Distribution of Maya peoples in Belize acccording to the 2022 census

The Maya are thought to have been in Belize and the Yucatán region since the second millennium BC; however, much of Belize's original Maya population was wiped out by disease and conflicts between tribes and Europeans. The Belizean Maya consist of three Maya groups who now inhabit the country: the Yucatec Maya (who came from Yucatán, Mexico to escape the Caste War of the 1840s) who mostly live in Corozal, Orange Walk and Cayo District; the Mopan (indigenous to Belize but were forced out by the British; they returned from Guatemala to evade slavery in the 19th century) who mostly live in Toledo; and Qʼeqchiʼ (also fled from slavery in Guatemala in the 19th century). The latter groups are chiefly found in the Toledo District.

== Kriols ==
Kriols make up roughly 21% of the Belizean population and about 75% of the Diaspora. They are descendants of the Baymen European slave owners, and slaves brought to Belize for the purpose of the logging industry. These slaves were mostly Black (many also of Miskito ancestry) from Nicaragua and born Africans who had spent very brief periods in Jamaica and Bermuda. Bay Islanders and more Jamaicans came in the late 19th century, further adding to these already varied peoples, creating this ethnic group.

For all intents and purposes, Kriol is an ethnic and linguistic denomination. Some natives, even those blonde and blue-eyed, may call themselves Kriols. The designation is more cultural than racial, and is not limited to any particular physical appearance.

The Kriol language was invented by slaves, and historically only spoken by them. However, this ethnicity has become synonymous with the Belizean national identity, and as a result it is now spoken by about 75% of Belizeans. Kriols are found all over Belize, but predominantly in urban areas such as Belize City, coastal towns and villages, and in the Belize River Valley.

Belize Kriol, also written as Belize Creole, is derived mainly from English. Its substrate languages are the Native American language Miskito, and the various West African and Bantu languages which were brought to the country by slaves. These include Akan, Efik, Ewe, Fula, Ga, Hausa, Igbo, Kikongo and Wolof.

== Garinagu ==
The Garinagu (singular Garifuna) are a mix of West/Central African, Arawak, and Carib ancestry. Though they were captives removed from their homelands, they were never documented as slaves. The two prevailing theories are that in 1635, they were either the survivors of two recorded shipwrecks, or somehow took over the ship they came with.

Throughout history they have been incorrectly labelled as Black Caribs. When the British took over Saint Vincent and the Grenadines after the Treaty of Paris in 1763, they were opposed by French settlers and their Garinagu allies. The Garinagu eventually surrendered to the British in 1796. The British separated the more African-looking Garifunas from the more indigenous-looking ones. 5,000 Garinagu were exiled from the Grenadine island of Baliceaux. However, only about 2,500 of them survived the voyage to Roatán, an island off the coast of Honduras. The Garifuna language belongs to the Arawakan language family, but has a large number of loanwords from Carib languages and from English.

Because Roatán was too small and infertile to support their population, the Garinagu petitioned the Spanish authorities of Honduras to be allowed to settle on the mainland coast. The Spanish employed them as soldiers, and they spread along the Caribbean coast of Central America. The Garinagu settled in Seine Bight, Punta Gorda and Punta Negra by way of Honduras as early as 1802. However, in Belize 19 November 1832 is the date officially recognised as "Garifuna Settlement Day" in Dangriga. According to one genetic study their ancestry is on average is 76% Sub Saharan African, 20% Arawak/Carib and 4% European.

== Emigration, immigration, and demographic shifts ==
Kriols and other ethnic groups are emigrating mostly to the United States, but also to the United Kingdom and other developed nations for better opportunities. Based on the latest U.S. Census, the number of Belizeans in the United States is approximately 160,000 (including 70,000 legal residents and naturalised citizens), consisting mainly of Kriols and Garinagu.

According to estimates by the CIA in 2009, Belize's total fertility rate currently stands at approximately 3.6 children per woman. Its birth rate is 27.33 births/1,000 population, and the death rate is 5.8 deaths/1,000 population.

== See also ==
- Demographics of Belize
- List of Belizean people
- Mennonites in Belize
