= VPM-FM =

KREM Radio (VPM-FM)
Belize City; Belize
- Broadcast area: National
- Frequency: 96.5 MHz
- Branding: "KREM"

Programming
- Format: Urban AC

Ownership
- Owner: Kremandala Ltd.

History
- First air date: November 17, 1989; 36 years ago

Technical information
- ERP: 96,500 watts
- Repeaters: 91.1 MHz Corozal; 101.1 MHz Belmopan

Links
- Website: KREM radio website

KREM Radio (call-sign VPM-FM) is a Belize City radio station operating on the F.M. band at 96.5, 91.1 and 101.1 MHz since November 17, 1989. Its headquarters are located at 3304 Partridge Street in Belize City, also the home of the Amandala newspaper and XTV (formerly known as Krem Television). It brands itself the "first private radio station in Belize" (not counting the now defunct British Forces installation in Ladyville).

== History ==
KREM Radio chairman and shareholder Evan X Hyde had briefly dabbled in radio broadcasting in the late 1970s at the country's only radio station at the time, Radio Belize. He hosted various sports programs such as local football and basketball games. After the 1977 City Council elections in which he ran as a People's United Party candidate, Hyde complained in the Amandala that he had not wanted to enter the race anyway. He believed he was being chiseled by the party's officials and elements in the party led by Minister C.L.B. Rogers, according to Hyde, conspired to take him off the air in 1978 at a football game in Orange Walk. Michael Hulse, a government employee whose responsibility it was to inform Hyde of his termination scornfully asked him, "You come to announce in Spanish or what?" when Hyde attempted to begin broadcasting the match. Manfred Atkins of the BCB and Hulse were pre-selected as game announcers despite a commitment to Hyde, and Orange Walk is predominantly Mestizo.

=== Establishment ===
Hyde left, vowing never to return to the air without a radio license in hand. His attempts to get this license lasted through 10 years and two governments, but eventually KREM made it to the air on signals 96.5 and 89.9 FM. Its DJs made use of dancehall and Belizean punta medleys in short two- to three-hour blocks, a sharp contrast to the educational half-hour programming then being favored by Radio Belize. Among the most popular DJs playing on KREM in those days were J.C. Arzu and Dion Gentle aka "Presi-D" or the "President", Kenny Morgan, and on Saturdays Evan "Mose" Hyde and partner Marshall Nunez, dubbed the "M&M Attack". In early 1991, KREM sponsored an entertainment awards show featuring the best performers of that day, dubbed "KREMEXCEL".

KREM also won acclaim for its primetime programming, most notably "Women's Roundtable" (later titled "Women at Work"), "The Kremandala Show" (hosted by Evan X), attorney Dickie Bradley's call-in talk show on Wednesday nights, "Belize Musicians Past and Present" hosted by musician Tony Wright, "The M&M Attack" on Saturday mornings, and sports telecasts featuring KREM-sponsored teams such as the Kremandala Raiders in basketball and Kremandala Lakers in football. A few of these programs are still on the air.

Balanced against KREM's successes was the privatization of Radio Belize in 1991, a move that forced the fledgling station to compete with a deep-pocketed former government entity. Soon Radio Belize branch Friends FM adopted the same format as KREM, emphasizing music over education, and KREM was facing financial ruin. A KREM broadcast tower was also attacked in 1992 at Baldy Beacon in the Cayo District.

=== Trouble in Trenchtown: 1995-2000 ===
With the accession of the United Democratic Party (UDP) to power in 1993, a conscious effort was made by UDP officials to stifle the expanding Kremandala empire, a signal of the enduring feud between the party and Hyde. UDP organs attacked KREM ad nauseam, and the ruling UDP handed out radio licenses left and right, including one that led to the formation of the UDP-owned WAVE Radio in 1998 after the UDP left office. The floundering radio station was actually forced to shut down for a week in 1995 and was continually unable to pay its bills. But it never lost its sense of pioneerism.

Dickie Bradley was the mainstay of the KREM lineup. His call-in talk show afforded listeners the opportunity to voice their thoughts on important Belizean issues and was an irritant to the authorities. Bradley launched his political career from the program in 1998 but lost to incumbent representative Dean Barrow narrowly, then again by a larger margin in 2003.

1998 was a particularly troublesome year for Krem: first, their on-site tower on Partridge Street was vandalized and nearly torn down, then sitting Minister Hubert Elrington denied the station a license for a few months after their current one expired. KREM was seen as being too friendly with the then Opposition PUP, and Hyde son Cordel was due to run against Elrington in a City division (he would win). Plus, sponsorship for semi-pro basketball had dried up because of the UDP's anti-Krem campaign and the dominance of the Raiders (four championships and one runner-up in six years), and the UDP-orchestrated 1998 Caricom Men's Basketball Tournament, which Belize won, as a slap to the face of semi-pro.

The PUP won elections in 1998, and things quickly settled down. But it did not take long for them to flare up again, when in 2000 KREM sought a television license which was objected to by broadcast leader Channel 5 on grounds of monopoly. KREM TV would set up shop in 2004.

=== KREM today ===
Recently, KREM lost significant advertising revenues from businesses related to British businessman Michael Ashcroft as a result of an undeclared war over Ashcroft's high-handed business dealings in Belize in recent years, particularly over BTL. BTL's BelizeWeb portal knocked KREM's livestream access near the end of May. From The Publisher

==== Sagis claim ====
A company called Sagis Investments Limited sued KREM through Barrow and Williams law firm (the firm of current Prime Minister Dean Barrow when he was still a practicing attorney and Leader of the Opposition) in March 2007 for over $262,000 due in 10% of shares in the company, bought in 1994 as part of a loan deal for $100,000 with the Belize Bank.

The case went to court in May 2008 before Chief Justice Dr. Abdulai Conteh; Michael Young represented KREM and Vincent Nelson, Q.C., Sagis. In late May the Chief Justice ruled in favour of KREM, dismissing Sagis' claims and ordering KREM to pay back the loan at a 6% rate.

The case was appealed at the Belize Court of Appeal and the decision overturned, but after the Government nationalized BTL in 2009 the matter was settled.

== On-air staff ==
=== Hyde family ===
- Evan X Hyde - Creator and chief shareholder; host of the Kremandala Show
- Michael Hyde - station manager
- Evan "Mose" Hyde - former manager, DJ, morning show host

=== Other employees ===
- Lisa Kerr- daytime and weekend host
- Desiree Cain- news anchor, daytime and weekend host
- Tony Wright- musician and activist, "Belizean Beat" and "Saturday Morning Special" host
- E. Jay Hill- sportscaster, afternoon host
- DJ Frisco - early evening host
- DJ Hard Rock - late night host
- J.C. Arzu - announcer and technician
- Anthony Grant - announcer and technician
- Steve Anthony - announcer and technician
- Cliff Lewis - support technician
- Marisol Amaya - KREM News editor
- Yaya Marin Coleman - KREM TV camerawoman
- Edward "Bart" Sanchez- television director (previously played ball for the Raiders)
- Leticia Guerra-radio producer
- Hon. Cordel Hyde-former panelist, Belizean Sports (former Minister of Sports and son of Evan X)
- Gilroy "Press" Cadogan-panelist, Belizean Sports (contributes to Amandala; previously wrote for The Belize Times)
