= KTV =

KTV may refer to:

- An Asian term for a karaoke box

== Medicine ==
- Kt/V, a measure of haemodialysis
- Standardized Kt/V, a measure of haemodialysis, different from Kt/V

== Television ==
=== Broadcasters ===
- Korea TV, Korea
- Kansai Telecasting Corporation, Japan
- Kent Television, Canterbury, UK
- Kohavision, a Kosovo TV station
- KTV Ltd., Falkland Islands
- Kurdistan TV, Iraq
- Kuwait TV
- KTV (Mozambique)

=== Channels ===
- KTV (India), Tamil-language
- KTV, fictional television channel in the 2000 Indian film Phir Bhi Dil Hai Hindustani
- Kids & Teens TV, Florida, USA
- K-T.V. or Kids TV, South Africa

=== Programs ===
- Karaoke Television, Belize music competition

== Organisations ==
- Municipal Workers' Union, a Finnish former trade union

== See also ==
- K (disambiguation)
- KT (disambiguation)
- Karaoke (disambiguation)
