= Soico Televisão =

Mozambican television channel

STV
- Country: Mozambique
- Broadcast area: Mozambique

Ownership
- Owner: Grupo Soico
- Sister channels: STV Notícias

History
- Launched: 25 October 2002

Links
- Website: stv.co.mz

Soico Televisão, abbreviated STV (styled in mixed case as Stv) is a Mozambican commercial terrestrial television network founded in 2002 by Daniel David's Grupo Soico.

== History ==
Soico TV started on October 25, 2002, after a month of experimental broadcasts, by former TVM employee Daniel David. Initially, the channel's programming was entirely in English, due to an affiliation agreement with the South African pan-African television network TVAfrica (at the time CTV Africa), with which it established a strong partnership. TVAfrica owned a 20% stake in the station. Within months, the channel quickly consolidated itself as a competitor to TVM, in terms of programming, as it had more liberties in creating programs as opposed to TVM, which caused the public sector to rearrange its structure.

The station was initially domiciled inside a makeshift facility in a rented apartment. One bedroom housed the control room, the other housed a solitary Apple Macintosh and mixers. The living room was the studio. When it started broadcasting, Daniel David had appointed a reduced staff of just seven. Within three months on air, the agreement with TVAfrica was halted, because this went against David's will for STV to aim for a more local profile, as the network aimed at a more international audience.

STV in its early years was also noteworthy for carrying sporting events, with the prime example being UEFA Euro 2004, and won an award by TVZine that same year, on the grounds of the quality of its news and current affairs programming. The channel also took part in the production of causes related to HIV-AIDS and other campaigns.

The channel was initially only available in Maputo, when it gained the rights to air Euro 2004, the channel caused massive controversy due to the coverage, as STV was unable to secure a deal with TVM to license the matches. STV had successfully licensed the rights to Rádio Moçambique ahead of the start of the tournament, which was the only solution for viewers outside of Maputo to follow the matches.

STV already had a considerable influence, in spite of its limited coverage, thanks mostly to the broadcast of political discussions and Brazilian telenovelas. A study conducted in January 2006, out of 2,300 people, showed heavy preference for STV, with 45% of the sampled population preferring the network, in opposition to 44,2% to TVM. The primary vectors that defined such preference were in news, debates, telenovelas and movies. By then, STV's coverage area had extended to include the provinces of Gaza, Inhambane, Manica and Sofala, with the aim of extending to Zambézia and Nampula in 2007.

A contract was signed with TV Globo in 2004, which also included a contract with Canal Futura (in 2005, four editions of Globo Ecologia were filmed in Mozambique, while in 2006, three episodes of Um Pé de Quê? were co-produced between the two). In 2007, STV also had agreements with LIM Group, e.tv, M-Net and the BBC.

On 24 April 2012, STV signed a protocol with Portuguese commercial channel SIC.

On March 31, 2023, STV started high-definition broadcasts on TV Cabo.

In July 2024, Linha Directa moved to a 1:30pm timeslot and local entertainment programming increased.
