= Daniel David (disambiguation) =

Daniel David is a Romanian professor.

Daniel or Dan David may also refer to:

- Daniel Alexandru David (born 1983), Romanian footballer
- Daniel David (media entrepreneur) (born 1966), media entrepreneur from Mozambique
- Dan David (songwriter) (born 1977), Canadian violinist, musician, and songwriter
- Dan David (businessman) (1929–2011), Romanian-born Israeli businessman and philanthropist
- Dan David (money manager), American money manager and whistle-blower

== See also ==
- Dan David Prize
