= Karaoke (disambiguation) =

Karaoke is a form of entertainment in which an amateur singer or singers sing along with recorded music.

Karaoke may also refer to:

- Karaoke (album), by Swedish musician Magnus Uggla
- Karaoke (TV series), a British drama written by Dennis Potter
- Karaoke (1999 Canadian film), a Canadian film directed by Stéphane Lafleur
- Karaoke (1999 Japanese film), a Japanese film directed by Shirō Sano
- Karaoke (2009 film), a Malaysian film directed by Chris Chong Chan Fui
- Karaoke (2022 film), an Israeli film directed by Moshe Rosenthal
- "Karaoke", a song by Big Freedia from the 2018 album 3rd Ward Bounce
- "Karaoke", a song by T-Pain from the 2008 album Three Ringz
- "Karaoke", a song by Boomdabash and Alessandra Amoroso from the 2020 album Don't Worry (Best of 2005-2020)
- "Karaoke", a song by Drake from the 2010 album Thank Me Later
- "Karaoke", a song by Beach Bunny from the 2022 album Emotional Creature

== See also ==
- Cairokee, an Egyptian rock band
- Karaoke box, also called KTV, karaoke television, karaoke TV
- Karaoke Television
- KTV (disambiguation)
