= KTV (Mozambique) =

KTV is a commercial television station in Mozambique. It was the first commercial station breaking the monopoly held by Televisão de Moçambique, but was plagued by financial issues and the death of its founder. It resumed under a new guise and a new format in 2006, but was quickly sold to the World Church of God's Power.

== History ==
KTV was the first private television station in Mozambique and Portuguese-speaking Africa. At the time it was known as RTK (Rádio e Televisão Klimt), with the K coming from its founder, Carlos Klimt. The channel competed with TVM and had similar programming, however it started showing notable differences from the state broadcaster, such as Catholic programming and news in the Tsonga language. Before then, Rádio Moçambique was the only media outlet to openly use native languages. By 1997, RTK was showing signs of a possible closure.

RTK's pioneering attitudes gave the channel the upper hand, aside from programming made for the channel, it aired pirated movies and cartoons. After some time, the channel started facing a crisis, to the extent that it started selling slots to the Universal Church of the Kingdom of God. With limited human resources, the channel continued its decline, which culminated with the death of Carlos Klimt in 2002 and its eventual shutdown.

The channel resumed operations in 2006 under a new name, KTV. The channel was owned by Media Eventos. In its first year, the new KTV was still carrying experimental broadcasts, promoting sister radio station KFM. It also carried some Formula 1 races and became the first television channel to use live texting, which was quickly emulated by other channels (TVM, STV and TIM)

The editorial line of the reformed network was generalist, with basic provisions including one newscast per day, three interview programs per week and one debate per week. Six movies were being inserted in the weekly schedule.

Within a few years, around 2010, the channel was sold to the World Church of God's Power led by Valdomiro Santiago, the channel drastically changed its programming line to match its guidelines, emphasizing more on its activities instead.
