= Walter Rossa =

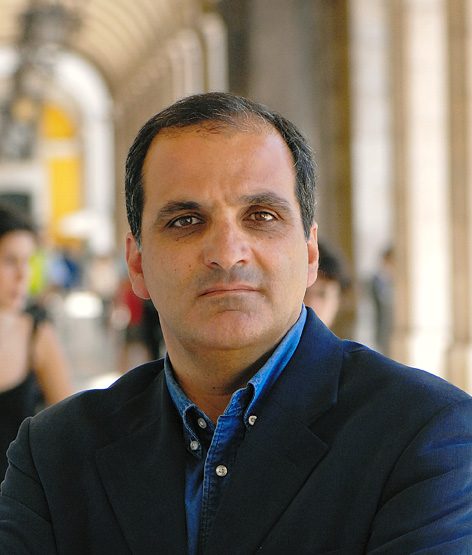
Walter Rossa

Walter Rossa is an architect, an urban planner, a researcher, and a Professor of the University of Coimbra.

== Training and career track ==
Graduate in Architecture by the Technical University of Lisbon (1985), Master in History of Art by the Universidade Nova de Lisboa (1991), PhD (2001) and Aggregate in Architecture (2013) by the University of Coimbra. Full Professor at the Department of Architecture of the University of Coimbra (1989), and researcher at the Center for the History of Society and Culture of the University of Coimbra (2021). He has been visiting professor at Federal University of Bahia, Fluminense Federal University, Pablo de Olavide University, M_EIA - Instituto Universitário de Artes, Tecnologia e Cultura do Mindelo, University of Porto, University of Lúrio, Goa University (Cunha Rivara Chair), University of the Algarve (Odebrecht Capistrano de Abreu Chair), and [[University of Massachusetts Dartmouth, (Hélio and Amélia Pedroso/ Luso-American Development Foundation Endowed Chair)]]. Till 2016 he was the first director of the interactive website HPIP, Heritage of Portuguese Influence/ Património de Influência Portuguesa and, he still is, with Miguel Bandeira Jerónimo, coordinator of the PhD programme Heritages of Portuguese Influence.

== Academic track ==
He has published works on the history and theory of urbanism, history of architecture, and cultural heritage in Portuguese, English, Spanish, French, and Italian. His research has been developed following two main tracks:

I. One dedicated to land ordinance, urban planning, and urbanism of Portuguese Influence, which main milestones are:

1. His master's degree thesis published in Portuguese and English (1998): Beyond Baixa: signs of urban planning in eighteenth century;
2. The book chapter A cidade portuguesa (1995), published at the História da Arte Portuguesa directed by Paulo Pereira;
3. The bilingual book Indo-Portuguese Cities: a contribution to the study of Portuguese urbanism in the Western Hindustan (1997);
4. The consolidation of that research track has been reached in 2002 with the book A urbe e o traço: uma década de estudos sobre o urbanismo português gathering his most relevant papers produced from 1989 to 2001;
5. The research project Bombay Before the British: the Indo-Portuguese layer. (2004-2007), held under his coordination is another milestone.

During the last years, his work evolved through the reading of Iberian urbanism cultures as a whole, with respect to the transfer of the main European urbanizing procedures and models on the configuration of colonial cities and territories. The first synthesis comes out as the keynote lecture Stone Raft: allegory on the spread of European urbanistic in Early Modern times, addressed to the 12th International Conference on Urban History: Cities in Europe Cities in the World (2014), held by the European Association for Urban History (EUHA).

II. The second research track is about urban planning for relevant cultural heritage contexts. Although his work was primarily focused on planning and project experiences during the first years, it became gradually more and more centered on the theoretical discussion. Among those experiences are:

1. The proposal for the Conservation Project of S. Salvador of Grijó Competition (2002). 1st Prize-winner;
2. The proposal for the Conservation Plan for Rua da Sofia (Coimbra) Ideas Competition (2003). 3rd Prize-winner;
3. The proposal for the Project of the Coa Valley Museum Competition (2004). 3rd Prize-winner;
4. The coordination of the Pombaline Nucleus of Vila Real de Santo António Conservation Plan (2003-2005), and the rebuilding project for its Casa da Câmara e Cadeia City Council Building (2006-2009).

These plans and projects have been published, including its theoretical support and discussion. Other texts addressing the conceptualization of cultural urban heritage and safeguard and/ or conservation planning, are gathered in the book Fomos condenados à cidade: uma década de estudos sobre património urbanístico.

III. During the last years the finding of synergies between that two research tracks lead him and his research team to the formulation, testing and development of concepts like grammar and urbanistic heritage, drawing history, hyperdraw and heritage as technology, leading his urbanistic analysis work to be made under the trinomial guidance of structure, form and image. His last work on that is the book chapter "Urbanismo ou o discurso da cidade". In Patrimónios de Influência Portuguesa: modos de olhar. Coimbra, Lisboa e Niterói: Imprensa da Universidade de Coimbra, Fundação Calouste Gulbenkian, Editora da Universidade Federal Fluminense, 2015. He is also become more committed with cooperation in the Portuguese Speaking countries, trying to apply his expertise on behalf of sustainable development actions in advanced teaching and strategic planning.

The last and most representative action on that is the cooperation he established between the universities Lúrio and Coimbra regarding teachers' interchange and training. Among some ongoing actions within that frame, in July 2018, he edited with his Ph.D. students Nuno Lopes and Nuno Simão Gonçalves the book Oficinas de Muhipiti: planeamento estratégico, património, desenvolvimento (Mihipiti Workshop: strategic planning, heritage, development), that gathered the methods and results of the homonymous event that took place in the Island of Mozambique in July 2017, regarding issues of that UNESCO's World Heritage Listed site.

Walter Rossa's academic track includes a set of research projects and other activities from which are especially relevant:

- Director (with Renata Araujo and Hélder Carita) of the project The city as civilization: Portuguese Urbanistic Universe 1415-1822, held by Comissão Nacional para as Comemorações dos Descobrimentos Portugueses between 1996 and 2002. It was a crucial milestone to the consolidation of research and network building. Besides a couple of scientific meetings (including a large congress in Coimbra in 1999), it produces a set of relevant publications.
- Curator (with Artur Teodoro de Matos, João Paulo Oliveira e Costa and Fernando António Baptista Pereira) of the exhibition Os espaços de um Império held by the Comissão Nacional para as Comemorações dos Descobrimentos Portugueses at Porto in 1997.
- Project Leader of the project Bombay Before the British: the Indo-Portuguese layer, (2004-2007) granted by Fundação para a Ciência e Tecnologia.
- Coordination (with Leão Lopes) of SIRUM, International Seminar of Urban Conservation of Mindelo (Cape Verde) (2006), co-produced by Centro de Estudos de Arquitetura da Faculdade de Ciências e Tecnologia of the Universidade de Coimbra, Atelier Mar and Instituto Universitário de Artes, Tecnologia e Cultura do Mindelo (2006).
- Curator (with Ana Tostões) of the exhibition Lisbon 1758, the Baixa Plan today, produced in 2008 by the Lisbon Municipality.
- The editorial project Património de Origem Portuguesa no Mundo: arquitetura e urbanismo (Portuguese Heritage Around the World), granted by Calouste Gulbenkian Foundation. José Mattoso directed the project and Walter Rossa coordinated the Asia and Oceania volume published in Portuguese in 2011, in English in the following year. This project culminated with the creation of the interactive website HPIP, Heritage of Portuguese Influence, directed by Walter Rossa.
- Coordination for the Portuguese Language Countries "Region" of the UNESCO's Global Report on Culture and Sustainable Urban Development (2016).
- Coordination (with Isequiel Alcolete) of Oficinas de Muhipiti/ Muhipiti Workshop: strategic planning, heritage, development, a universities of Coimbra and Lúrio joint action regarding the Island of Mozambique, a site of the UNESCO's World Heritage List (2017).

He has pedagogical experience. Beyond a teaching practice, he has supervised 81 theses (16 PhDs). The PhD programme Patrimónios de Influência Portuguesa (Heritages of Portuguese Influence) that he coordinates at the University of Coimbra since 2010, has been awarded the prize Projetos Inovadores no Domínio Educativo (Education Innovative Projects) granted by Calouste Gulbenkian Foundation, not only because of component but also due to its purpose to raise up an international think tank on the Portuguese influence heritages subject, that now has a more comprehensive and institutional framework with the UNESCO Chair described above.

Walter Rossa is seldom requested to consult on heritage subjects, to scientific committees, and to make conferences in many countries (Argentina, Brazil, Cabo Verde, China, France, Guatemala, India, Italy, Macao, Morocco, Mexico, Mozambique, Nederland, Portugal, Singapore, South Africa, Spain, Taiwan, USA, and Uruguay).

== Relevant publications ==
Author and co-author:

- 1995: A cidade portuguesa. História da Arte Portuguesa. Lisboa: Círculo de Leitores;
- 1997: Indo-Portuguese Cities: a contribution to the study of Portuguese urbanism in the Western Hindustan. Lisboa: Comissão Nacional para as Comemorações dos Descobrimentos Portugueses;
- 1998: Beyond Baixa: signs of urban planning in eighteenth century Lisbon. Lisboa: IGESPAR;
- 2002: A urbe e o traço: uma década de estudos sobre o urbanismo português (1989-2001). Coimbra
- 2003: Portuguese land ordinance and urbanising strategies for Asia. Congress Rivalry and Conflict, European Traders and Asian Trading Networks. Leiden: dir. Leonard Blussé, CNWS Publications. 2005;
- 2005: Lisbon's waterfront image as allegory of baroque urban aesthetic. Symposium Circa 1700: Architecture in Europe and the Americas. Washington (Studies in the History of Art, 66) National Gallery of Art
- 2005: Problems and precedents of the "Portuguese City": understanding medieval urbanism. Murphy. Coimbra: Departamento de Arquitectura da Faculdade de Ciências e Tecnologia da Universidade de Coimbra. nº1, 2006. With Luísa Trindade;
- 2006: Bombay Before the British: the indo-Portuguese layer. Mumbai Reader. Mumbai: Urban Design Research Institute;
- 2011: Former Portuguese Urban Settlements in Indian Ocean borders: last developments on its research, Entretiens du Patrimoine de l’Ocean Indien / Indian Ocean Heritage Conference La Réunion. Montpellier: dir. Attila Cheyssial, Editions de l’Espérou. 2013;
- 2012: Il piano per Lisbona dopo il terremoto del 1755. Terremoti e ricostruzioni tra XVII e XVIII secolo, atti dei seminari internazionali. Palermo: Maria Giuffrè e Stefano Piazza (ed.), Edibook Giada;
- 2015: Fomos condenados à cidade: uma década de estudos sobre património urbanístico (2002-2013). Coimbra: Imprensa da Universidade de Coimbra. 2015;
- 2015: Urbanismo ou o discurso da cidade. Patrimónios de Influência Portuguesa: modos de olhar. Coimbra, Lisboa e Niterói: Imprensa da Universidade de Coimbra, Fundação Calouste Gulbenkian, Editora da Universidade Federal Fluminense;
- 2015: Modos de olhar. Patrimónios de Influência Portuguesa: modos de olhar. Coimbra, Lisboa e Niterói: Imprensa da Universidade de Coimbra, Fundação Calouste Gulbenkian, Editora da Universidade Federal Fluminense; with Margarida Calafate Ribeiro.
- 2018: "Lisboa Moderna: da utopia de uma imagem de capital ribeirinha". Projecções de Lisboa: utopias e estratégias para uma cidade em movimento perpétuo. Lisboa: Caleidoscópio: 42-59.
- 2021: "Juvarra: scenografia urbanistica per una Lisbona dell’Illuminismo". Filippo Juvarra, Domenico Scarlatti e il ruolo delle donne nella promozione dell’opera in Portugallo, ed. Giuseppina Raggi & Luís Soares Carneiro. Roma: Artemide. 11-22.
- 2022: "Myth as the catalyst of a cultural heritage-building process: the case of Goa". Portuguese Literary & Cultural Studies, 36/37. Dartmouth: Tagus Press: 81-105

Editor and co-author:

- 2001: A construção do Brasil urbano. Oceanos 41. Lisboa: Comissão Nacional para as Comemorações dos Descobrimentos Portugueses;
- 2001: Actas do Colóquio Internacional Universo Urbanístico Português 1415-1822. Lisboa: Comissão Nacional para as Comemorações dos Descobrimentos Portugueses. 2001. With Renata Araujo and Hélder Carita;
- 2002: fac-similæ da Exposição Universo Urbanístico Português 1415-1822. Lisboa: CIUL/CML and CNCDP. 2002. With Renata Araujo and Hélder Carita;
- 2007: O Terramoto de 1755: impactos históricos. Lisboa: Livros Horizonte. 2007. With Ana Cristina Araújo, José Luís Cardoso, Nuno Gonçalo Monteiro and José Vicente Serrão;
- 2008: Lisboa 1758: the Baixa plan today, catalogue. Lisbon: Câmara Municipal de Lisboa. With Ana Tostões;
- 2011: Portuguese Heritage Around the World: architecture and urbanism: Ásia. Lisbon: Calouste Gulbenkian Foundation, Lisboa; with José Mattoso, (2011's APOM Prize winner for an International Project, and 2012's Nuno Viegas Nascimento Prize by Fundação Bissaya Barretto);
- 2015: Patrimónios de Influência Portuguesa: modos de olhar. Coimbra, Lisboa e Rio de Janeiro: Imprensa da Universidade de Coimbra, Fundação Calouste Gulbenkian e Editora da Universidade Federal Fluminense; with Margarida Calafate Ribeiro.
- 2016: Mafalala: memória e espaços de um lugar. Coimbra: Imprensa da Universidade de Coimbra; with Margarida Calafate Ribeiro.
- 2018: Dossier Portuguese colonialism in Goa: Nineteenth-Century perspectives. Revista Crítica de Ciências Sociais, 115; with Rochelle Pinto and Sidh Losa Mendiratta.
- 2018: Oficinas de Muhipiti: planeamento estratégico, património, desenvolvimento. Coimbra: Imprensa da Universidade de Coimbra; with Nuno Lopes and Nuno Simão Gonçalves.
- 2021: Patrimónios Contestados. Lisboa: Público: with Miguel Bandeira Jerónimo.
- 2022: Heritage of Portuguese Influence: histories, spaces, texts, and objects. Portuguese Literary & Cultural Studies, 36/37. Dartmouth: Tagus Press; with Miguel Bandeira Jerónimo e Anna M. Klobucka.
