= Economic and Social Forum of Mozambique =

Economic organization in Mozambique

The Economic and Social Forum of Mozambique was created in 2014 by the SOICO Group and today is also supported by the SOICO Foundation - FUNDASO. MOZEFO is a private economic and business forum whose purpose is to establish economic contacts in various areas of development, as well as to discuss the social and cultural conditions of the Mozambican people in various domains.

== Purpose ==
It wished to build a platform for fostering a balance between public and private decision-making bodies in identifying Mozambique's problems in its development process. It also proposes lines of action resulting from the debate and agreement on the challenges raised, and finally, monitoring the impact of the lines of action defined, establishing regular monitoring and interaction points and ensuring the continuity of the topics between the forums.

MOZEFO was born with the objective of serving as a platform for understanding and seeking endogenous, inclusive and sustainable solutions. Daniel David, founder of SOICO, argues that:

In order to form an enlightened society capable of implementing Mozambique's projects, it is necessary to promote operational efficiency and the creation of jobs and services, establishing appropriate business practices that transform knowledge into pulsating energy, an inexhaustible source of action. The commitment to solidarity and the valorization of man reaches its full meaning with the participation of all the fringes of society, thus realizing the true and essential exchange of knowledge.

== Editions ==
=== 1st Edition - 2015 ===
It took place from December 2 to 4, 2015, in the city of Maputo and under the motto: "The Future Is Now. Humanizing Growth" It was based at the Eduardo Mondlane University and held a preparatory cycle of five thematic conferences on different key sectors for the country's growth. There was talk of energy, agriculture, tourism and infrastructure and logistics. MOZEFO organized four forums for these major themes. Then a fifth conference on funding. It also published five books that were the conclusions of the 1st Forum under the motto "A challenge to the future". In the forums, there are national and international speakers. Forum was attended by 2,700 people.

Presidents Joaquim Chissano and Thabo M'beki, Prime Minister Luísa Diogo, Social Activist Graça Machel and current President of the Portuguese Republic, Marcelo Rebelo de Sousa, participated. Also invited were present and former governors, entrepreneurs, academics and artists, as well as foreign guests such as the executive director of Galp, Carlos Gomes da Silva, the president of the Luso-American Development Foundation, Vasco Rato, and the former minister of Portuguese Finance Jorge Braga de Macedo.

=== 2nd Edition - 2017 ===
It was held between November 22 and 24, 2017, with the motto "Knowledge, Motivation, Action: Accelerate the Road to Sustainable Development". It aimed to provoke broad reflection from the following question: How can nations invest in knowledge and seek motivation to trigger concerted action to accelerate inclusive and sustainable development? In this sense, the MOZEFO Forum 2017 gathered in Maputo a group of prestigious international and national speakers such as Joaquim Chissano, former President of the Republic; Vicente Fox, former President of the Republic of Mexico; Laura Chinchilla, former President of the Republic of Costa Rica; José Luis Rodríguez Zapatero, former Prime Minister of Spain; José Maria Neves, former Prime Minister of Cape Verde; Paulo Portas, former Prime Minister of Portugal; or Rama Sithanen, former Deputy Prime Minister and Minister of Finance of Mauritius.

=== 3rd Edition - 2019 ===
The 3rd edition of the Forum was convened for 21 and 23 November 2019 in Maputo. The slogan "Africa 2030. Mozambique as a catalyst for transformation"
