= Daniel David (media entrepreneur) =

Media Entrepreneur

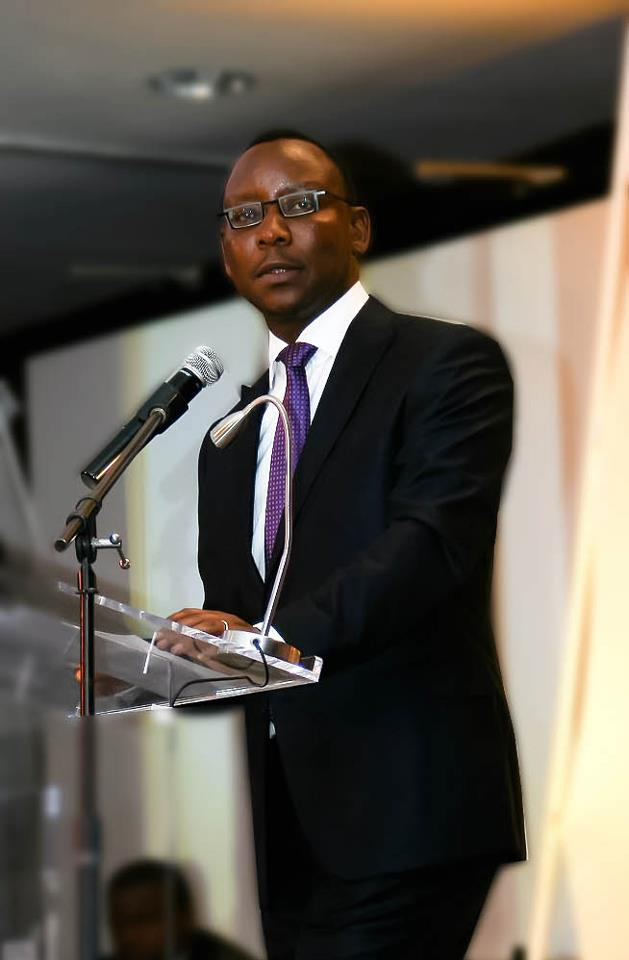
- Born: 15 February 1966 (age 60); Maputo, Mozambique
- Education: Degree in Business Administration and Management
- Occupation: CEO of SOICO Group
- Writing career
- Language: Portuguese
- Notable awards: Commander of the Order of Merit of Portugal (President of the Portuguese Republic)
- Website: ddavid.org

Daniel David (15 February 1966) was born in Maputo, Mozambique. He is a CEO & Chairman of DHD Holding and Economic and SOICO Group. And he is one of the main voices of the region advocating for sustainable development, economic growth, innovation and the use of technology for the digital transformation of Africa.

== Biography ==
Daniel David was born in the Moamba district of Maputo province. He began by working as a Physical Education teacher, but then he was attracted to South Africa's gold mines, like many other young people of his age, and left Mozambique. He work there as a miner for 18 months and later returned to Mozambique.

He attended the Management course at UNISA RSA University (Advanced Executive Program), and holds a degree in Business Administration and Management from the Polytechnic University (formerly ISPU).

== Business career ==
He joined the Television of Mozambique (TVM) as an administrative in 1989. After that, he was the director of training and cooperation; commercial director and marketing and later, appointed member of the board of directors of TVM. In 2000, when he was 34 years old, he founded Independent Communication Society (SOICO, Ltd), the first private media group in Mozambique to hold a television channel (Stv, 2002), a radio station (Sfm, 2004), a daily newspaper (O País, 2005) and the international cable news channel STV Notícias (2014).

=== International career ===
He has had a long professional career, nationally and internationally. Throughout his career, Daniel David had a continental projection in the area of Social Communication. In 1998, was elected vice-president of URTNA (African Union of Broadcasting) and he had special appearances in United Nations Forum on TV and Radio – New York; Common Wealth Broadcast Convention – Cape Town; SABA – Southern African Broadcast Association.

In September 2009, he was the only Mozambican invited to be a member of the "Clinton Global Inniciative" meeting, the year after his biography appeared in the book "Africa Greatest Entrepreneurs", published by Moky Makura. In 2010, he participated of the Gala International Emmy Awards in New York. Four years later, in 2014 he was president of the Mozambique-Portugal Chamber of Commerce.

== Implication in the development of Mozambique ==
=== Mozambican Economic and Social Forum - MOZEFO ===
In 2014 he launched the Economic and Social Forum of Mozambique - MOZEFO, inaugurating a space of intersectoral and inter-generational dialogue that did not exist in the country until then. The second edition of the Forum was held in 2017. The MOZEFO's mission is to contribute to the accelerated, inclusive and sustainable economic growth of Mozambique, bringing together the private sector, public sector and civil society in a debate platform aimed at identifying challenges and proposing solutions for a more humanized growth.

=== MozTech ===
In 2014 he created MozTech, currently Mozambique's largest technology fair, a space for debate, interaction and exchange of experiences between different sectors of society with the aim of putting technology at the service of the country's development. In 2018, MozTech held its fifth edition, focused on the importance of digitalization.

=== 100 Best SME Award ===
He also created the 100 Best SME Award, which since 2012 rewards the best performing small and medium-sized companies in the Mozambican market.

== Awards and honours ==
In 2007, he received the honorary award "Emerging Entrepreneur of the Year Award", awarded by Ernst & Young. He has been recognized as well with various national and international acknowledgments, such as the distinction by the president of the French Republic, Jacques Chirac in 2007, at the Afrique Avenir Forum and the rank of Commander of the Order of Merit awarded by the president of the Portuguese Republic, Marcelo Rebelo de Sousa, in 2016.
