= Karaoke Television =

Belizean music competition television series

- Also known as: KTV
- Created by: Stewart Krohn
- Directed by: Rick Romero
- Starring: William Neal
- Country of origin: Belize
- No. of episodes: 83

Production
- Executive producer: Stewart Krohn Producer = Mary Rhaburn
- Running time: 60 minutes (variable with each episode)

Original release
- Network: Channel 5
- Release: February 20, 2001 – October 30, 2007

Karaoke Television, usually called KTV for short, was a live-action music competition airing on Great Belize Television (Channel 5). It premiered in February 2001 and completed six seasons as of October 30, 2007.

== Origins and format ==
KTV, according to host William Neal, originated from a karaoke competition hosted by Channel 5 the previous year during its annual "Gimme 5" Christmas special. Neal claimed the show was not looking as much for real singing talent as for stage performance- giving a good performance for the audience. Auditions for the first season were held for most of February, primarily at Channel 5's Belize City office.

The first show aired on February 20, 2001, from the Bellevue Hotel on Southern Foreshore. Six contestants (trimmed to five in later seasons) appeared and sang a selection played by the karaoke director (originally Richard Villanueva, later replaced by a team featuring former champion Louis Maskall). The best performer was selected by a group of judges and advanced to the semifinal round; in all ten semifinalists were selected. In the semi-finals, the contestants again sang a song of their own choosing and the top two advanced to the final round. In the final, each contestant sings two songs and composite scores are totaled for a grand champion. In the 2005 and 2006 seasons the semi-final round included a "lightning round" in which the contestants selected a song they had not rehearsed and sang a portion of it to the judges. Small prizes were regularly donated and awarded to all participants; typically, the weekly winner received souvenirs and a cash prize from Channel 5. The grand prizes have changed from season to season; a karaoke machine was awarded in 2005, while in 2006 the main prize was a bedroom set.

=== Hosting Duties ===
After Neal left the country on sabbatical in 2003, veteran broadcaster Neil Hall took over for one season. A children's edition of KTV aired later in 2003, hosted by Maureen Dawson, and it took the 2004 season off. KTV resumed in 2005 with Neal as host from a different venue, the Bliss Center for Performing Arts Palm Court (home of the Institute of Creative Arts, successor to the Belize Arts Council). For Ultimate KTV, the Bliss Center's Auditorium was used, seating over 600.

=== Judging categories ===
The contestants were judged on three categories: Performance (worth 40 points), voice quality (40) and clarity of lyrics (20), for a total 100. The lightning round performances in later seasons were judged out of ten. While points were not awarded for props and style, attire and stage presence have proven somewhat important in the judging of KTV.

=== Season 6: Ultimate KTV ===
For the sixth season of KTV, producers announced a number of changes in format, in keeping with a "Tournament of Champions" format. For the first time, the show will have three permanent judges critiquing singers, but not voting for them, instead of rotating ones as in previous seasons. Viewers for the first time had the chance to select their favorite singers to advance through a text messaging system, operated by Belize Telemedia, open immediately before the show up until the Sunday prior to the next show at midnight AM (for instance, if the show airs on July 10 at 9 PM CST, text lines will be open from then up to Sunday, July 15 at 11:59 PM CST). In week 6 of the competition, trouble with sponsor Telemedia's system extended voting to 12:00 PM CST on the day of the competition.Sept. 24 report

Past finalists and champions (a total of 17, see below) joined what became fourteen other selections garnered from two country wide auditions held at the Bliss. The first prize was $10,000 (Belize dollars) cash, though other prizes were awarded. The show continued on Tuesday nights, with William Neal as host, and returned to Sunday night in-season replays.

The first two shows of season six, aired on July 10 and 17, were prerecorded highlights of the auditions held on June 30 and July 7 respectively, and judged by Jennifer Lovell. The first live show of the final season aired on July 24, 2007, in which thirteen contestants were selected from a final field of 20. Due to cancellations by past contestants, several new faces have been called back to compete in addition to the established field; the episode for September 25 presented just three contestants.

==== Permanent judges ====
The three judges selected to preside for the duration of the sixth season are:

- Jennifer Lovell- Accomplished singer and musician, rotating judge in seasons 4 and 5, judged 1st 2 audition shows.
- Santiago (Santino) Castillo Jr.- Businessman, sports and entertainment enthusiast; former bandleader and part-time vocalist for Santino's Messengers.
- Ann-Marie Williams- journalist.

== Weekly winners ==
=== Season 1 (2001) ===
Bellvue Hotel, Southern Foreshore, Belize City.

- February 20: Joseph Carr, "My, My, My" (Johnny Gill)
- February 27: Shermaine Jones, "Crazy" (Patsy Cline)
- March 6: Rina Villanueva, "Candela" (unknown artist)
- March 13: Shaheda Usher, "From This Moment On" (Shania Twain)
- March 20: Tremmett Perriott, "Lady" (Kenny Rogers)
- March 27: Nalleli Rodas, "Greatest Love of All" (Whitney Houston)
- April 11: Darwin Cayetano, "This I Promise You" (NSYNC)
- April 18: Carlton Cain, "Delilah" (Tom Jones)
- April 25: Delice Pinkard, "Please Forgive Me" (Bryan Adams)
- May 1: Sheridath Williams, "I'll Make Love to You" (Boyz II Men)
- May 8 (semifinal 1): Tremett Periott, Shermaine Jones
- May 15 (semifinal 2): Darwin Cayetano, Rina Villanueva
- May 22 (Championship): Rina Villanueva (runner-up Tremett Perriott)

=== Season 2 (2002) ===
Club Calypso (Princess Hotel), Newtown Barracks, Belize City.

- February 19: Adilean Coffin, "Greatest Love of All" (Whitney Houston)
- February 26: Osvaldo Perez, "La Vida Es Un Carnaval" (unknown)
- March 5: Rohjani Perriott, "Nobody's Supposed to Be Here" (Deborah Cox)
- March 12: Cherrymae Flowers, "Independent Women Part 1" (Destiny's Child)
- March 19: Dale Turner, "Say You, Say Me" (Lionel Richie)
- March 26: Joseph Carr, "Incomplete" (Sisqo); first multiple winner
- April 2: Fr. Oliver Smalls, "Can You Feel The Love Tonight" (Elton John)
- April 9: Vanya Garcia, "Hero" (Mariah Carey)
- April 16: Sheryl Lyn Chavarria, "Honey, I'm Home" (Shania Twain)
- April 23: Dennis Peyrefitte, "Purple Rain" (Prince)
- April 30 (semifinal 1): Cherrymae Flowers, Rohjani Perriott
- May 7 (semifinal 2): Joseph Carr, Vanya Garcia
- May 14 (championship): Rohjani Perriott, Cherrymae Flowers 2nd (Note: initial scoring error awarded second to Garcia)

=== Season 3 (2003) ===
Club Calypso (Princess Hotel), Newtown Barracks, Belize City

- April 1: Vivian Jones, "I'm Alive" (Celine Dion)
- April 8: Dejon Tucker, "Angel" (Shaggy)
- April 15: Elizabeth Villanueva, "Nobody's Supposed to Be Here" (Deborah Cox)
- April 22: Catherine Paulino, "What's Up" (4 Non Blondes)
- April 29: LeRoi Hyde, Sweat (A La La La La Long) (Inner Circle)
- May 6: Adilean Coffin, Think Twice (Celine Dion)
- May 13: Sheridath Williams, Hero (Enrique Iglesias)
- May 20: Patricia Leyton, I Turn To You (Christina Aguilera)
- May 27: Louis Maskall, No Letting Go (Wayne Wonder)
- June 3: Ernestine Carballo, Fallin' (Alicia Keys)
- June 10 (semifinal 1): Sheridath Williams, Adilean Coffin
- June 17 (semifinal 2): Louis Maskall, Ernestine Carballo
- June 24 (championship): winner Louis Maskall, runner up Ernestine Carballo

=== Season 4 (2005) ===
Bliss Center for the Performing Arts Palm Court, Belize City.

- January 18: Leon Banks, Drowning (Backstreet Boys)
- January 25: Lorraine Bennett, song unknown
- February 2: Felicita Arzu, song unknown
- February 9: Hubert Goff, song unknown
- February 16: Angelo Fabro, song unknown
- February 23: Reecie Pollard, The Greatest Love of All (Whitney Houston)
- March 2: Herbert Wiltshire, song unknown
- March 9: Thomas Cayetano, song unknown
- March 16: Melonie Gillett, song unknown
- March 23: Ronald Casimiro, "My Girl" by The Temptations
- March 30:Ronald Casimiro," The way you make me feel" by ( Michael Jackson)
- March 30 (semifinal 1): Lorraine Bennett, Angelo Fabro
- April 6 (semifinal 2): Reecie Pollard, Melonie Gillett
- April 13 (championship): winner Angelo Fabro, runner-up Lorraine Bennett

=== Season 5 (2006) ===
Bliss Center Palm Court, Belize City.

- March 28: Monica Lewis, "These Boots Are Made for Walkin'" (Nancy Sinatra)
- April 4: Cindy Rowland, "I Believe in You and Me" (Whitney Houston)
- April 11: Otty Trujillo, "Unchained Melody"
- April 18: Karen Haylock, "Don't Come Home A' Drinkin' (With Lovin' on Your Mind)" (Loretta Lynn)
- April 25: Ronald Casimiro, "Penny Lover" (Lionel Richie)
- May 9: Shernadine Peters, "Nobody's Supposed to Be Here" (Deborah Cox)
- May 16: Trecia Gabourel, "How Could an Angel Break My Heart" (Toni Braxton)
- May 23: Aidita Arguelles, "Objection (Tango)" (Shakira) (this episode hosted by Neil Hall)
- May 30: Dejon Tucker, "Hound Dog" (Elvis Presley)
- June 6: Patrick McPherson, "Act Naturally" (Buck Rogers)
- June 13 (semifinal 1): Trecia Gabourel, Ronald Casimiro
- June 20 (semifinal 2): Dejon Tucker, Patrick McPherson
- June 28 (championship): winner Patrick McPherson, runner-up Ronald Casimiro

=== Season 6 (Ultimate KTV, 2007) ===
Bliss Center Auditorium, Belize City. Note: Winners announced the following week.

- July 31: Ronald Casimiro, "Kiss and Say Goodbye" (The Manhattans)
- August 7: Audrey Augustine, "Listen" (Beyoncé)
- August 14: Herbert Wiltshire, "Mama Look a Boo Boo" (Harry Belafonte)
- August 28: Melanie Gillett, "If I Ain't Got You" (Alicia Keys)
- September 11: Patrick Mcpherson, "Knock Three Times" (Tony Orlando and Dawn)
- September 18:Dillon Jones, "Tell Laura I Love Her" (Ray Peterson)
- September 25: Reecie Pollard, "Try It on My Own" (Whitney Houston)
- October 2:Angelo Fabro, "Without Love" (Tom Jones)
- October 9 (semifinal 1): Herbert Wiltshire, Melanie Gillett
- October 16 (semifinal 2): Reecie Pollard, Angelo Fabro
- October 23 (championship): Reecie Pollard (champion), Melanie Gillett (runner-up)

== Kids KTV ==
Note: Aired in October and November 2003, Club Calypso at Princess Hotel, Belize City.

- Week 1 20/10: Donna Neal (juniors), Wilson Grinage (seniors)
- Week 2 27/10: Tanisha Bodden (juniors), Lucien Dawson (seniors)
- Week 3 02/11: Marlecia Lizama (juniors), Tracy Gomez (seniors)
- Week 4 09/11: Godwin Sutherland (juniors), Shiniki Leslie (seniors)

Championship 16/11: Donna Neal (juniors), Tracy Gomez (seniors)

== Champions ==
- 2001: Rina Villanueva (Belize City) (presumably no relation to Richard)
- 2002: Rohjani Perriott (Belize City)
- 2003: Louis Maskall (Sandhill Village, Belize District)
- 2005: Angelo Fabro (Corozal Town, Corozal District)
- 2006: Patrick McPherson (Sittee River Village, Stann Creek District)
- 2007: Reecie Pollard (Crooked Tree Village, Belize District)

=== Notes ===
- Usher, from the first season, is the youngest contestant to have appeared, being in her teens. Due to her appearance Channel 5 commissioned an under-18 tournament two years later.
- Channel 5 re-aired all first-run episodes on Sundays at 8:00 PM since the show's premiere (occasionally moved up to 4:00 or 4:30).
- Several contestants have appeared more than once in the series (not counting semifinals and championship appearances). However, prior to 2007, no champion returned to defend his or her title during the show's run (McPherson, as 2006 defending champion, was eliminated in the semifinals).
- Channel 5 experienced two separate technical incidents during the 2006 season. On May 2 the show was pre-empted for the first televised game of a national side international basketball qualifier series against Mexico (Belize lost), then the scheduled June 27 championship final was moved to Wednesday, June 28 due to inclement weather. Ironically, though no showers threatened the 9:00 PM start time, twenty minutes into the program a driving storm sent everyone scattering into the Bliss Center Auditorium. Channel 5 covered the delay with clips from past shows and reruns of UPN comedies All of Us and Girlfriends until the show resumed around 10:30 PM CST. The rest of the show went normally and McPherson was crowned champion at 11:30 PM that night, after which Five went immediately to a newscast repeat.
- Hurricane Dean caused the second preemption of a KTV airing, in the 2007 season. The episode originally scheduled for August 21, 2007 was postponed and aired a week later. Hurricane Felix's threat to Belize postponed the airing scheduled for September 4, pushed back to September 11.
- Channel 5 has edited clips from past shows into short music videos and re-aired them during lulls in programming. Casimiro, Fabro, Gillett and host William Neal (ad-libbing Bobby Brown's "My Prerogative" during a break in the championship episode in 2005) are frequently featured. Updated clips from the completed Season 6 are now being shown.

== DVD release ==
During the Christmas season of 2007, Channel 5 announced the first DVD release of any KTV season with the release of The Best of Ultimate KTV, the season 6 DVD. A special airing was screened on Christmas Day. The DVD runs approximately two hours and sells for $40 BZ.

== Future ==
KTV finished its run with the grand finale on October 30, 2007, but Channel 5 has greenlighted a similarly themed program, Duets, to take its place in the 2008 summer season.

== Alumnae ==
A number of former KTV contestants are plying their trade in the local entertainment industry. Pollard, Fabro, Maskall, Tremett Perriott and others are frequently called on for singing engagements, but no CD's have yet been released from any participant.
