= Emory King =

Belizean historian and author

Emory King (February 22, 1931, Jacksonville, Florida, United States – August 14, 2007) was a self proclaimed Belizean historian, author, and journalist. He served the nation of Belize in a number of capacities, including as National Film Commissioner.

== Travel to Belize ==
In 1953, at the age of 22, King and a group of friends sailed south from the United States on a yacht and were shipwrecked off the coast of Belize, due to the barrier reef. After recovering, King elected to stay.

King notably helped find a home for the German-Dutch Mennonites, who had been expelled from Mexico in the 1950s.

== Association with the PUP and media ==
King found work with the ruling People's United Party, becoming especially close to leader George Cadle Price, and becoming a columnist/editor for the Belize Times in the 1970s. Also at that time King was named Film Commissioner; he was responsible for bringing several documentaries and films to Belize, working with both the predecessors of Belize's two television stations: Great Belize Television and Tropical Vision Limited. King also had bit parts in several movies produced in Belize, for more see Great Belize Television's article.

King also wrote several books, both historical and personal. Among them are Emory King's Drivers' Guide to Belize, The Great Story of Belize series, and others.

King was criticized for holding controversial historical views, particularly over the Battle of St. George's Caye, where he clashed with Belizean Evan X Hyde. He once headed the Belize Historical Society.

- Hyde on King and the 1931 hurricane

== Family and death ==
King married his wife Elisa King and had several children, one of whom, Alex, predeceased him. He also had several grandchildren.

King died from complications due to cancer on August 14, 2007, at his home in Tropical Park on the Western Highway, east of Hattieville.

== Filmography ==
Year	Title	Role	Notes
1986	The Mosquito Coast	Man at bar	
2001	After the Storm	Card player	

== References and external links ==
- Emory King at IMDb
- Emory King obit by Stewart Krohn
- Channel 7 Emory King tribute
