= Dan David (songwriter) =

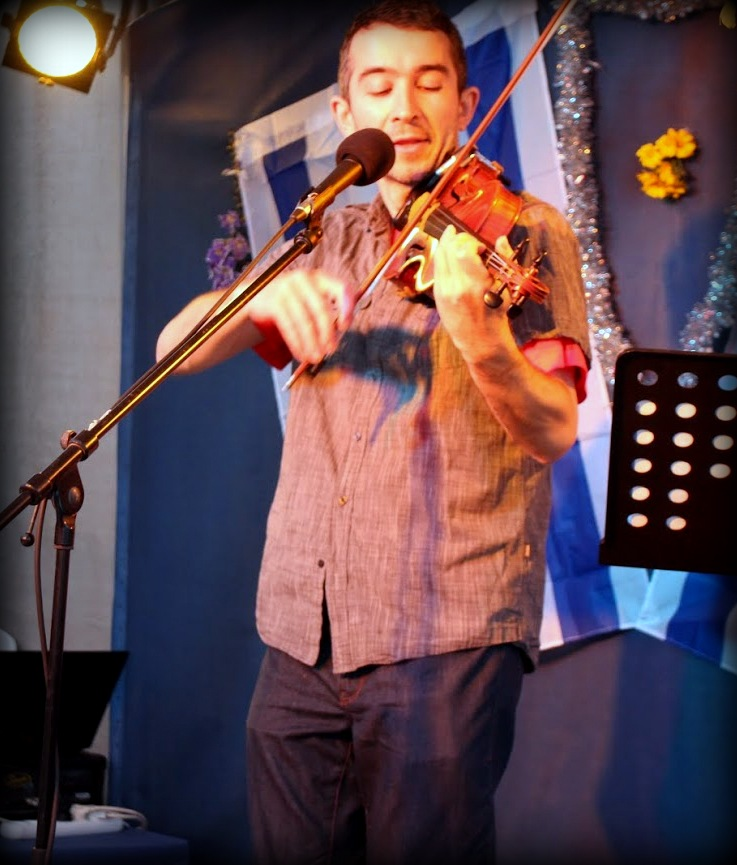
- Dan Performs In Israel

Background information
- Born: Daniel David -Aronovich; December 28, 1977 (age 48); Tel Aviv, Israel
- Genres: CCM Contemporary R&B, Worship, Celtic, Rock
- Occupations: Violinist, Songwriter
- Instrument: violin
- Years active: 2009-present
- Label: DDM Inc.
- Website: www.dandavidmusic.com

Dan David is a Canadian violinist, pop rock worship musician, and songwriter.

== Career ==
David released his first CD, The Right Place in 2004, which helped make him a Toronto-based success and got him featured on the cover of local and national newspapers and television programs, including 100 Huntley Street. His story was shared on The 700 Club, as well as on Vision TV and the Miracle Channel, in 2009.

David has participated in multiple tours across Canada, the United States and Israel sharing his music in both mainstream and faith-based circles.

Throughout his career David has had the opportunity to perform with many prominent faith-based musicians, including: rock singer Justin Hines, psalmist Marty Goetz and gospel singer Paul Wilbur. David was also featured on award winning guitarist Sean Spicer's instrumental Christian radio hit songs.

His song "Battle of David: has been performed on Jewish Voice with Jonathan Bernis, an international television program with worldwide audiences.

In late 2014, a rendition of his hit song "Battle of David" was nominated for a GMA covenant award. In October 2014, he began collaborating with acclaimed producer Jack Shocklee (Toby Mac, Montell Jordan) and in a recent interview announced his plans to begin new collaborations with accomplished artists from around the world.

He is signed to the independent record label DDMI (Dan David Music Inc).

== Personal life ==
David lives in Toronto. He has also published two books, including Violin Made Easy, distributed by Mayfair Music Canada which has been the publisher for Leila Fletcher piano books worldwide.

His story of coming to know Jesus has had some controversy within Jewish circles, and his rising success was the subject of an anti-Jesus campaign by Toronto-based Jewish anti-missionary group who tried to stop one of his outdoor concerts back in 2011.

== Discography ==
=== Studio albums ===
- The Right Place (June 5, 2004)
- There's Peace (February 13, 2008)
- One Million Reasons (January 18, 2010)
- On The Road with Dan David, DVD (April 11, 2012)
- Visions of Messiah (June 10, 2013)
- The Heavenly Peace (January 30, 2014)
- Battle of David, dance single (January 7, 2015)

== Awards ==
GMA Dove Awards

Year	Award	Result
36th GMA Covenant Awards (2014)	Instrumental song of the year	Nominated
