= Greater Belize Media =

- Headquarters: Belize City, Belize

Ownership
- Owner: Great Belize Productions Ltd. (GBPL)

History
- Launched: 9 December 1991
- Former names: Great Belize Television (GBTV), Channel 5

Links
- Website: www.greaterbelize.com

Greater Belize Media (GBM), formerly known as Great Belize Television (GBTV) and widely known as Channel 5, is a Belizean television and digital media company headquartered in Belize City. It is the operating brand of Great Belize Productions Ltd. (GBPL), founded in 1982 by Stewart Krohn. The company launched its first broadcast on 9 December 1991, debuting News 5 Live — the first locally produced, independent national television newscast in Belize — on the same day. After more than three decades of operation as Great Belize Television, the company officially rebranded as Greater Belize Media on 26 May 2025.

GBPL is a member of the Caribbean Broadcasting Union (CBU) and its subsidiary the Caribbean Media Corporation (CMC), the Public Media Alliance (PMA), and the Belize Chamber of Commerce. GBM's Facebook page has over half a million followers, the largest of any media organization in Belize.

== History ==
=== Origins (1982–1991) ===
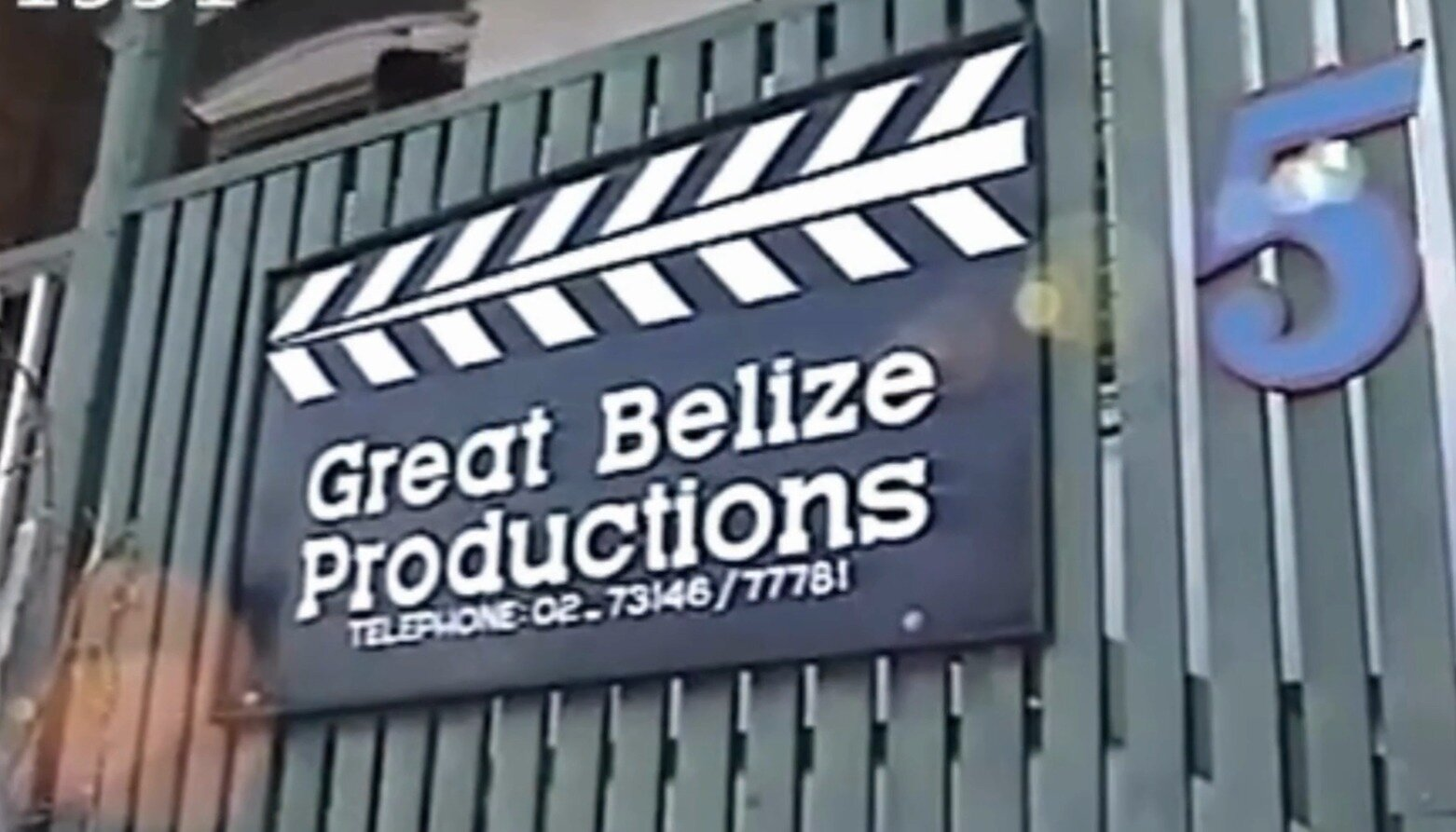
Previous Label for Great Belize Productions

Great Belize Productions Ltd. was established in 1982 by Stewart Krohn, an American-born journalist and media entrepreneur. Krohn had begun his career in Belizean journalism with Brukdown Magazine in 1977. GBPL began as a small video production company specialising in commercials, documentaries, and corporate productions, and provided production services to international film projects including The Mosquito Coast (1986), Caribe (1987), and Heart of Darkness (1993). Among the co-founders of GBPL was Emory King, a Belizean historian, author, journalist, and National Film Commissioner who had been instrumental in bringing international film productions to Belize. Stewart Krohn, in his tribute following King's death in 2007, described him as his business partner in founding "the nation's first television production company." During GBPL's pre-broadcast era, the series Belize All Over was produced, written, and presented by Silvaana Udz, featuring stories about Belize told by local personalities.

Krohn applied for a broadcast license in the early 1980s, but the process took approximately eight years due to the absence of broadcasting legislation in Belize. GBPL received its license from the Government of Belize in 1991. On 9 December 1991, Channel 5 went on air, launching News 5 Live on the same day. The station originally operated from Regent Street in Belize City.

=== Channel 5 (1991–2008) ===
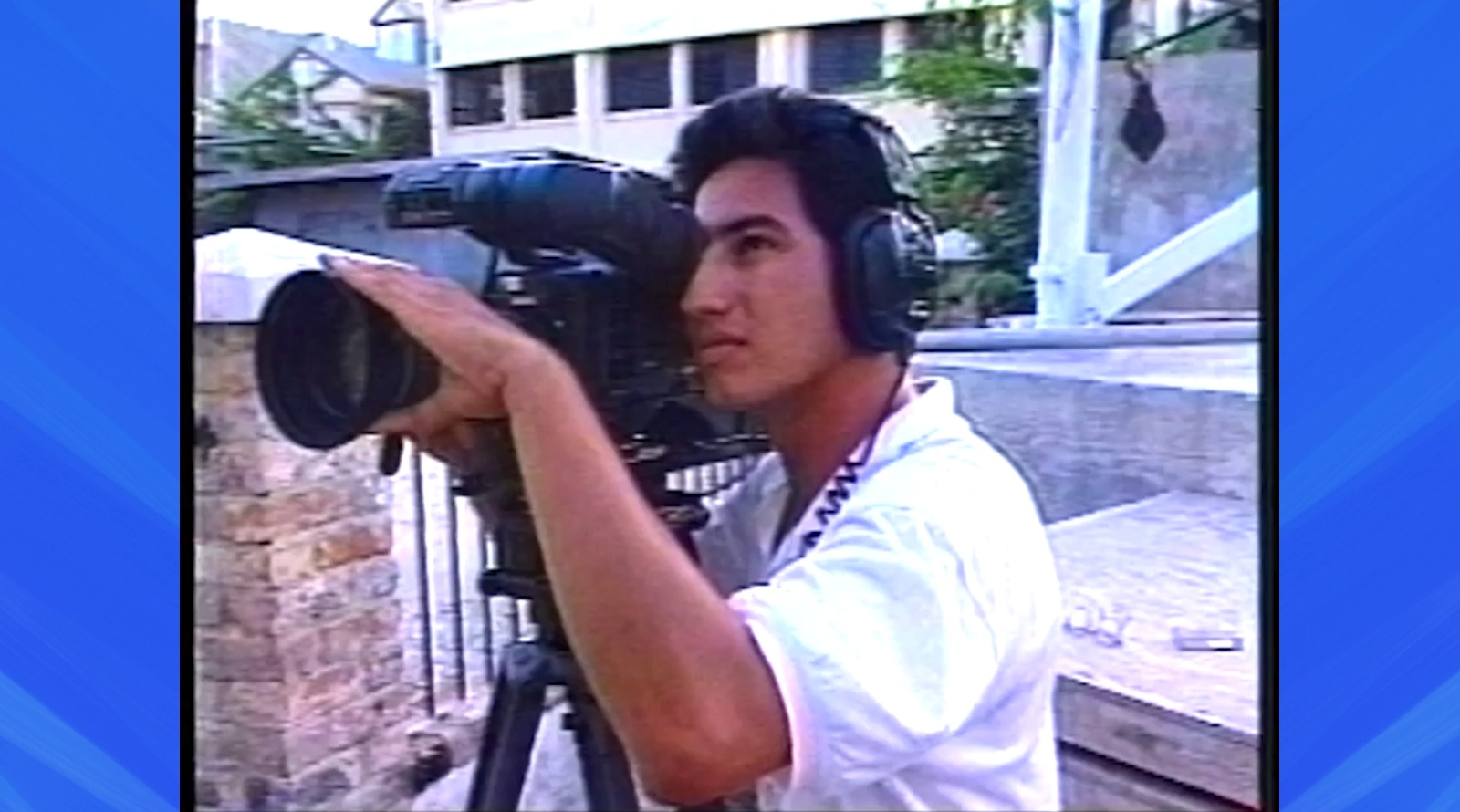
A Young Rick Romero at the start of Great Belize Productions

Under Krohn's leadership as founder, Managing Director, and News Director, Channel 5 grew into one of Belize's most recognized media institutions. News 5 Live established a reputation for independent, locally produced journalism at a time when much of Belize's television news came from foreign sources or was politically aligned; Channel 7, the only other television station in Belize, did not produce its own newscast until 14 February 1994.

Beginning in 1992, Channel 5 advertised its weekly program schedule in the Amandala newspaper, later shifting to The Belize Times before discontinuing the practice after 2003. Also in 1992, the station launched Gimme 5, an annual week-long viewer promotion held each December to mark the station's anniversary. In January 1998, the station launched channel5belize.com, among the earliest media websites in Belize, offering text transcripts and video streaming of News 5 Live.

Channel 5 produced a range of locally originated programs during this period, including The Andy Palacio Show, Lauren Da Mawnin, One on One with Stuart Leslie and Dickie Bradley, Spotlight, and Karaoke Television (KTV). Krohn served as President of the CBU from 1999 to 2011 and sat on the board of the CMC from its establishment in 2000. In May 1999 he received News 5's third CNN World Report award for a story on locally grown coffee. He was inducted into the CBU Caribbean Media Hall of Fame in 2011.

In June 2008, GBPL was acquired by Belize Telemedia Ltd. (BTL). Krohn departed to focus on resort development on the Placencia Peninsula, remaining a consultant to the company.

=== Channel 5 (2008–2021) ===
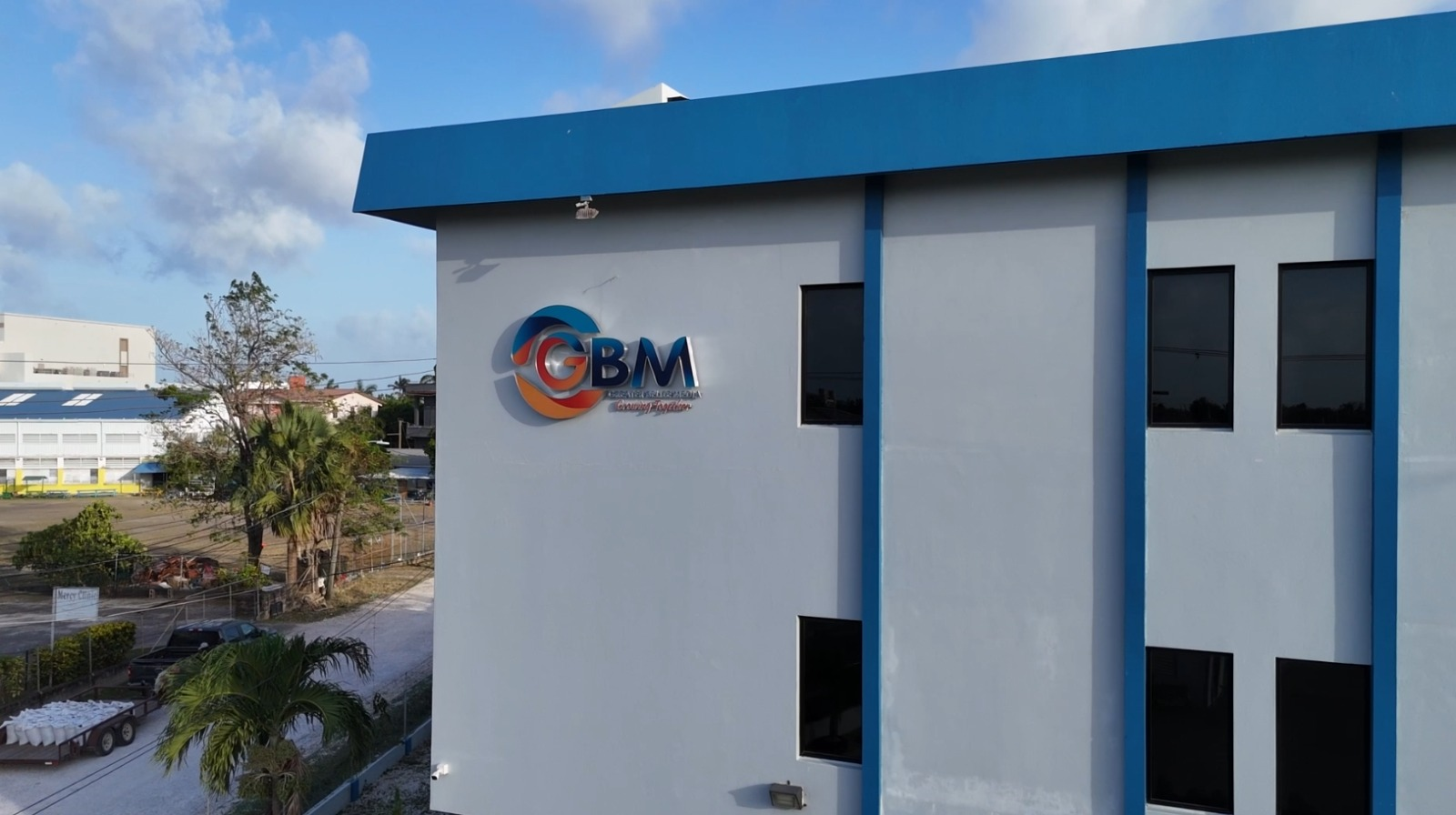
Greater Belize Media (GBM) Building on Coney Drive in Belize City

Following the Telemedia acquisition, Amalia Mai, a veteran journalist and former diplomat who had previously served in the Ministry of Foreign Affairs, was appointed CEO. Under her 13-year tenure the station launched several new programs including Open Your Eyes (2008), Great Belize Cooking, The Belize Apprentice, and Yes to I Do, and continued to win regional CBU awards. Mai served as Vice President of the CBU during her tenure. In 2009, Channel 5 relocated its headquarters from Regent Street to Coney Drive in Belize City.

In August 2009, the Government of Belize nationalised BTL, acquiring approximately 94% of its shares from companies controlled by Lord Michael Ashcroft. Prior to the nationalisation taking effect, GBPL was detached from BTL by the Ashcroft group and transferred into the Ashcroft Group of Companies, removing it from the assets acquired by the government. The government stated at the time it had no interest in acquiring the television station. GBPL has operated independently of Telemedia since that date. A subsequent legal claim by BTL seeking recovery of GBPL and the Coney Drive premises was struck out by the Court of Appeal in March 2015, with the court finding that the directors were indemnified from such claims under BTL's Articles of Association.

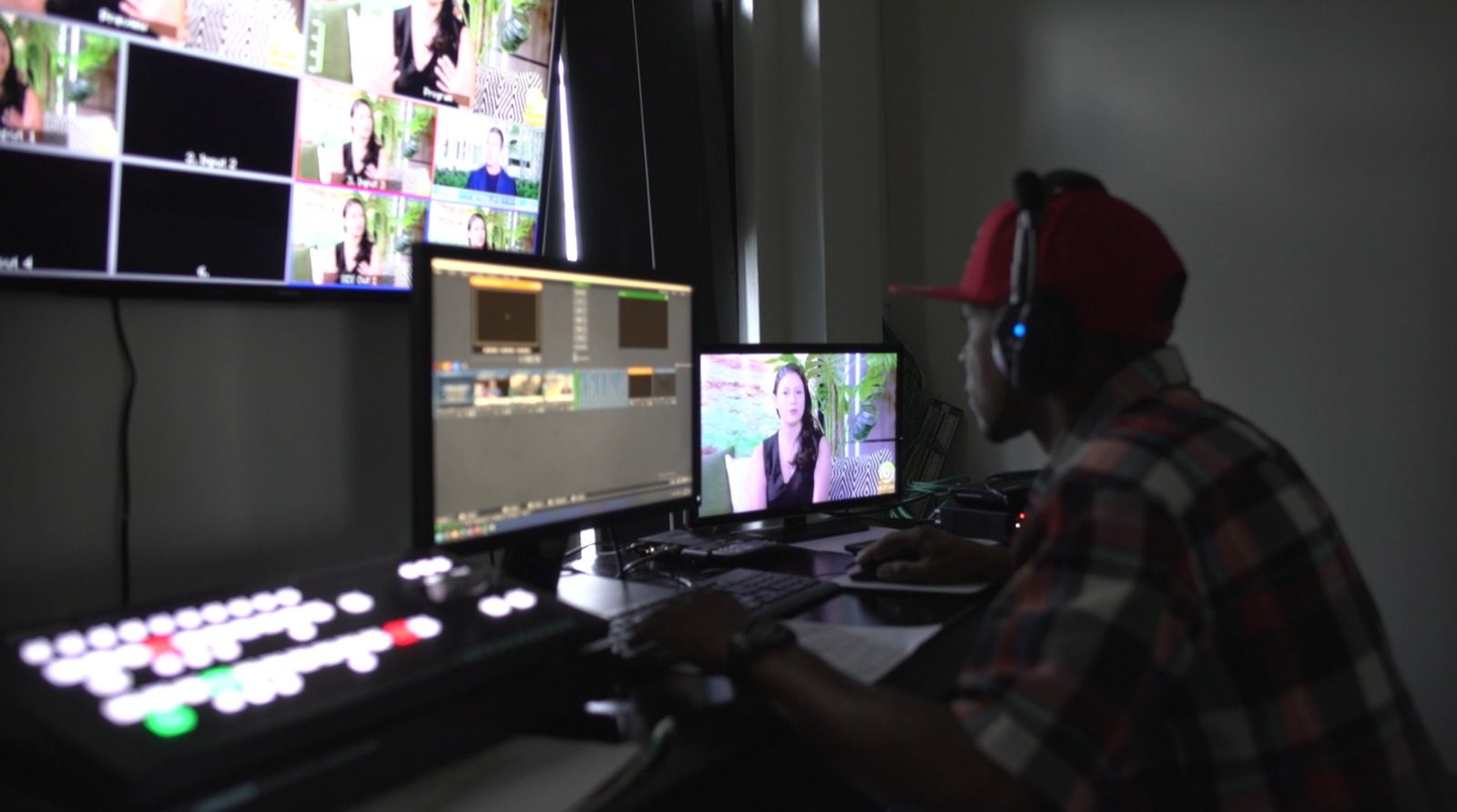
Technical Operator for Open Your Eyes

On 7 December 2010, the Government of Belize issued a press release announcing it was suspending normal relations with Channel 5 and GBPL — banning all government representatives from giving interviews or making official appearances on the station. Amandala described it as "a first for the Belizean press", noting the government cited alleged violations of Channel 5's broadcast license terms regarding the distinction between news and editorial commentary. The incident was subsequently documented in the Freedom House 2011 Freedom of the Press report on Belize. The ban lasted approximately two weeks.

Mai departed in February 2021 to take up a post as CEO in the Ministry of Foreign Affairs and Foreign Trade. She was succeeded by Marleni Cuellar, who had joined Channel 5 in 2006 as a part-time anchor on News 5 Live. Over the following 15 years she took on roles as talk show host, feature writer, special correspondent, and producer — hosting Open Your Eyes for 14 years and producing Great Belize Cooking, The Belize Apprentice, and Mapping the Guatemalan Claim — while becoming an active part of the management team and winning multiple regional CBU awards. She was appointed CEO in February 2021.

=== Channel 5 / GBM (2021–present) ===
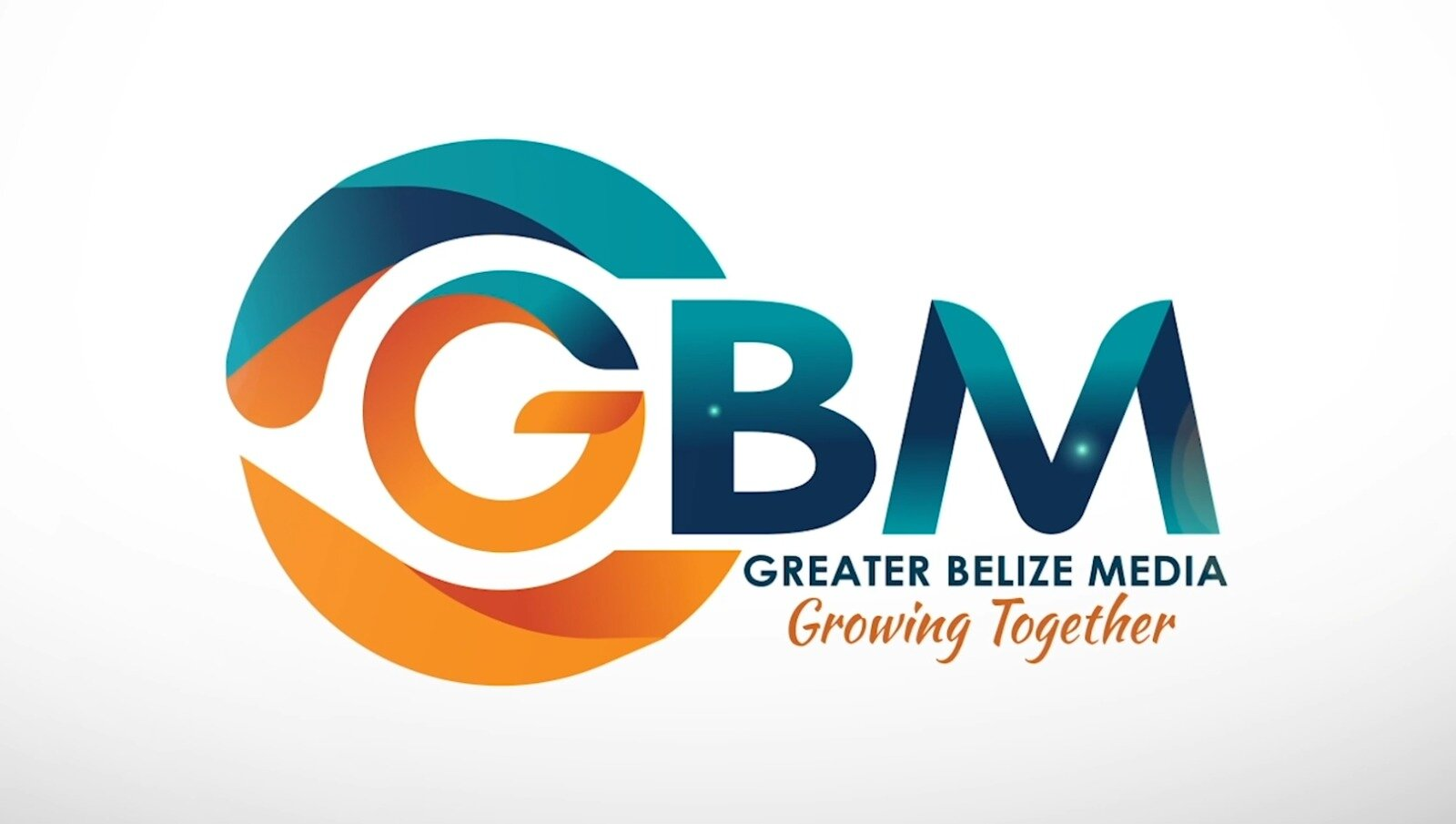
Logo of Greater Belize Media.

From 2021, the company pursued a strategic shift toward digital operations and multi-platform expansion. In 2023, the company established a dedicated digital news department under the leadership of Digital Editor Hipolito Novelo — the first at any television station in Belize — producing content specifically for web and social platforms. In 2024, the company implemented a newsroom convergence strategy, bringing together the digital news department with the existing television news department into one integrated editorial team operating with a digital-first approach. The same year, the company completed an upgrade from analog to high-definition broadcasting.

In 2025, several new programs launched: News 5 @ Noon, a midday bulletin; Noticiero 5 Semanal, Belize's first national Spanish-language television newscast; and Morning Boost, a morning fitness program. The company officially rebranded as Greater Belize Media on 26 May 2025, adopting the tagline "Growing Together" — reflecting the company's view that its growth is intrinsically tied to the growth of Belize and its communities.

Coinciding with the rebrand and the station's 34th anniversary in December 2025, GBM transitioned to an all-local content broadcast schedule under the banner "All Belizean, All Day, Every Day", branded as GBM Classics. The initiative drew on over 30 years of GBM's own archival content, making available a continuous broadcast of locally produced programming spanning three decades, including early editions of Lauren Da Mawnin, The Andy Palacio Show, KTV in its various iterations, and documentary series from different eras of Belize's development. GBM described the initiative as both a cultural preservation effort and a platform for new local creators.

== Programs ==
=== News 5 Live ===
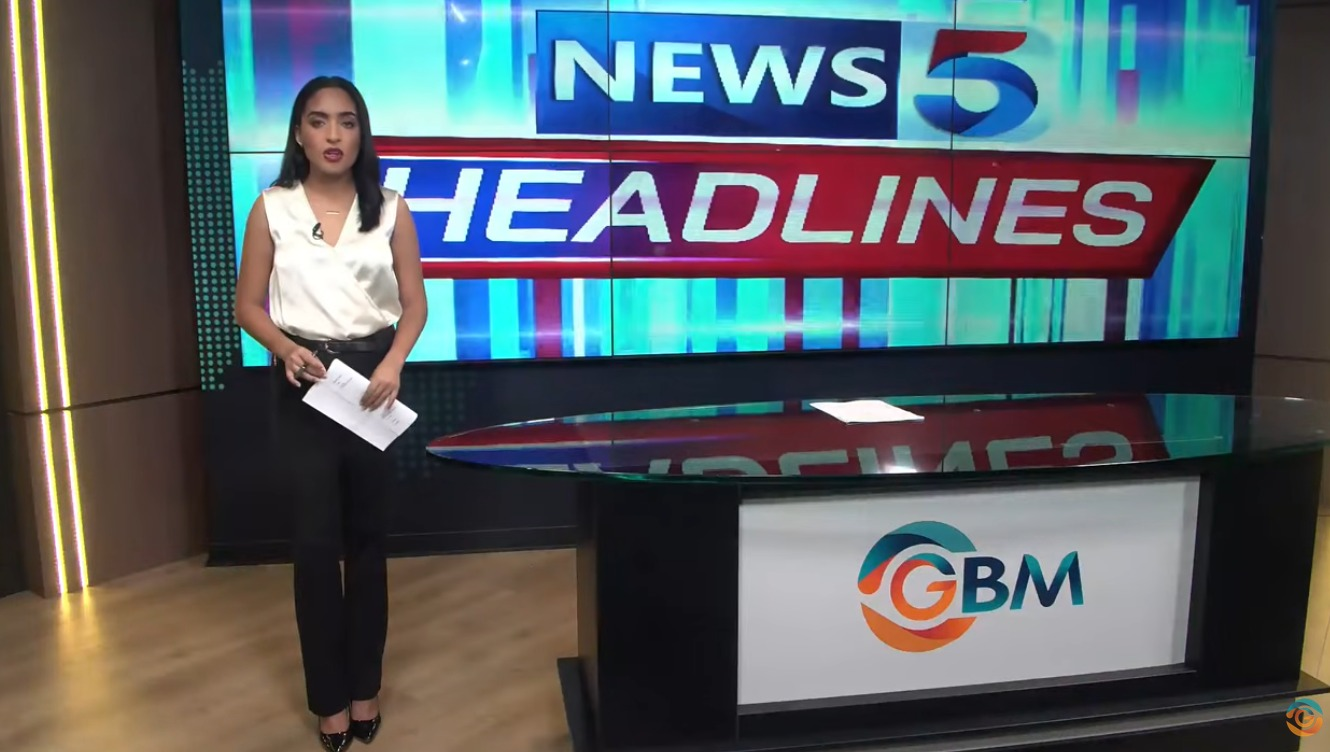
News 5 Live anchor Sabreena Daly

News 5 Live is the flagship program of Greater Belize Media — the first locally produced, independent national television newscast in Belize, airing weeknights since its premiere on 9 December 1991, and the country's longest-running television program. Created by Stewart Krohn, the program airs every weeknight (Monday through Friday) at 6:00 p.m. and runs for approximately 75 minutes including commercials, with a possible extension during election season. The newscast originally aired at 6:30 p.m. but moved to 6:00 p.m. during COVID-era curfews and retained that time thereafter. It opens with "Tonight on News 5 Live" and closes with "And that's the news!"

News 5 Live includes several recurring special feature segments. Sports Monday, a weekly round-up of sporting highlights, dates back to at least 2012. From 2023, the newscast added Bright Side, a Friday segment hosted by Sabreena Daly spotlighting individuals and initiatives making a positive impact across Belize; Kolcha Tuesday, weekly cultural heritage features; and Belize On-Reel, weekly features on unique stories from around the country. In 2024, the program added 5 Point Breakdown, a biweekly Wednesday explainer segment examining the how and why of issues of national significance.

=== Open Your Eyes ===
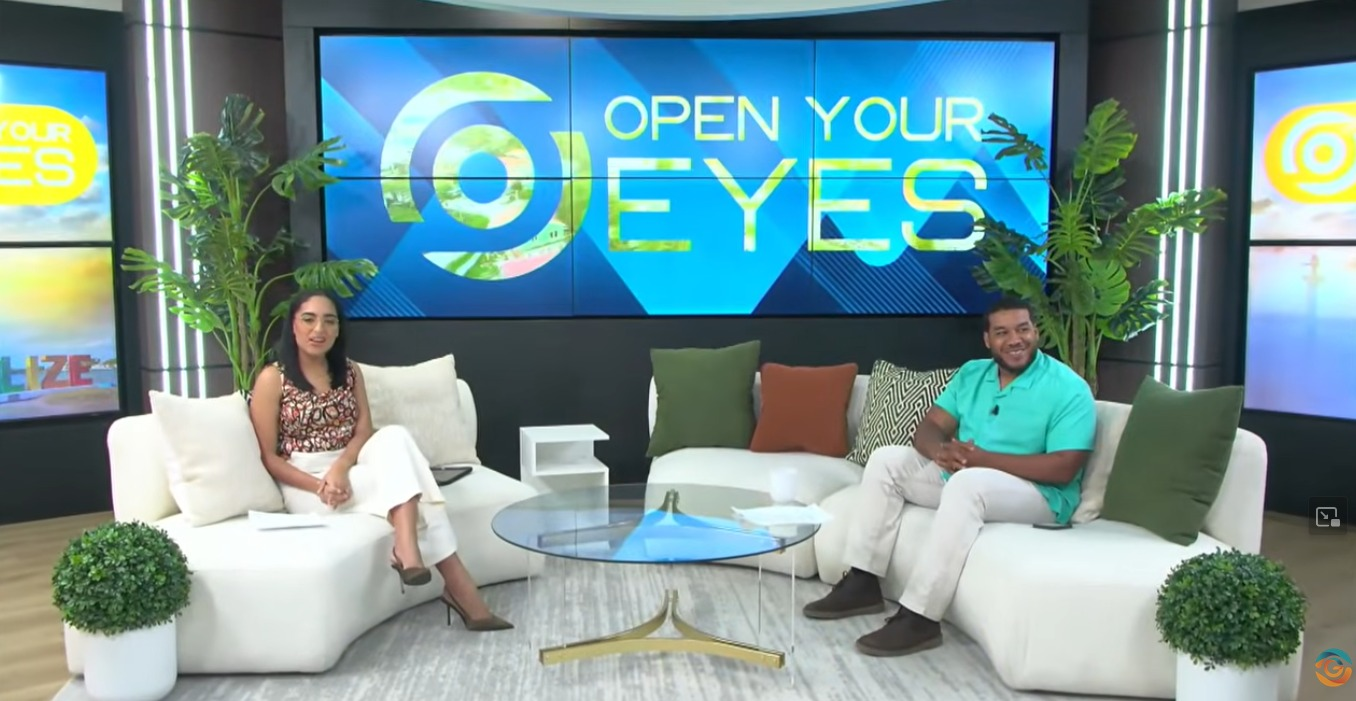
Open Your Eyes Hosts Sabreena Daly and Paul Lopez

Launched in 2008, Open Your Eyes is a weekday morning talk show combining news, entertainment, and community stories, airing from 6:30 to 8:30 a.m. Marleni Cuellar and William Neal were the original hosts, later joined over the years by co-hosts John Palacio, Gavin Courtney, Isani Cayetano, and April Martinez. After 14 years as host, Cuellar passed the role to Sabreena Daly. The program has received awards from the CBU. In 2024, it underwent a significant upgrade including a new studio and logo.

=== Noticiero 5 Semanal ===
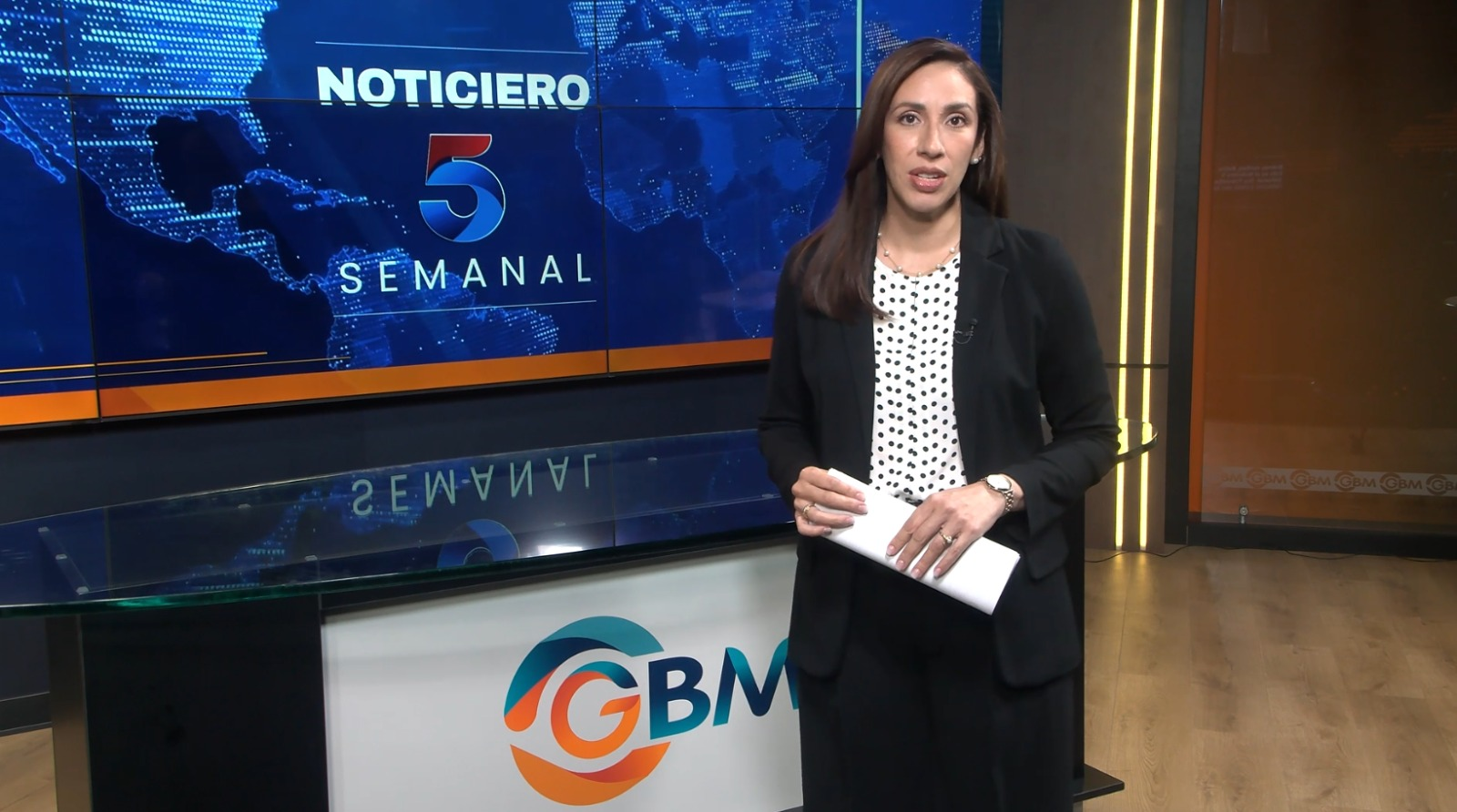
Noticiero 5 Semanal anchor Franzella Hermoso

Launched on 7 March 2025, Noticiero 5 Semanal is Belize's first national Spanish-language television newscast, anchored by Franzella Hermoso and produced by Digital Editor Hipolito Novelo. GBM cited the 2022 national census by the Statistical Institute of Belize, which found that 54% of the Belizean population speaks Spanish, as the basis for the initiative. Produced entirely in Spanish, it initially aired weekly on Fridays at 7:00 p.m. before moving to Thursdays at the same time. In its first year it expanded to include an interactive audience poll and a dedicated international and regional segment, Pulso Internacional. The program reached its first anniversary in March 2026.

=== News 5 @ Noon ===
Launched on 2 December 2024, News 5 @ Noon is a ten-minute midday bulletin designed to keep viewers informed of national and regional developments throughout the day. It airs across all News 5 platforms including YouTube and Facebook.

=== Current programs ===
| Program | Description | Years |
|---|---|---|
| News 5 Live | Weeknight flagship news program; Belize's longest-running television program | 1991–present |
| News 5 @ Noon | Midday bulletin | 2024–present |
| Noticiero 5 Semanal | Belize's first national Spanish-language television newscast | 2025–present |
| Open Your Eyes | Weekday morning talk show | 2008–present |
| Morning Boost | Morning fitness program; airs at 6:00 a.m. | 2025–present |
| Verandah Tales | Award-winning children's reading and education program (seasonal) | — |
| KTV the Remix | Reboot of the long-running KTV karaoke program (seasonal) | — |
| Gimme 5 | Annual week-long viewer promotion each December | 1992–present |

=== Past programs ===
| Program | Description | Years |
|---|---|---|
| The Andy Palacio Show | Discussed local music; Palacio also composed the News 5 Live theme | — |
| Lauren Da Mawnin | Morning program featuring comedian Lauren Burgess; spawned the Sunday primetime spinoff Lauren Da Nite | — |
| Belize All Over | Stories about Belize told by local personalities; produced, written, and presented by Silvaana Udz | late 1980s |
| One on One | Talk program featuring Stuart Leslie and Dickie Bradley | — |
| Spotlight | Talk program | — |
| Karaoke Television (KTV) | Long-running karaoke competition program | — |
| KTV Latino | Spanish-language karaoke program | — |
| Duets | Musical pairs competition; created by Stewart Krohn, directed by Rick Romero; grand prize of BZ$10,000 | — |
| KTV Duets | Combined elements of KTV and Duets | — |
| Race to the Garland | Local program | — |
| Be the Next Superstar | Talent competition | — |
| Great Belize Cooking | Travel cooking show | 2008–2021 |
| The Belize Apprentice | Reality program | 2008–2021 |
| Yes to I Do | Reality program | 2008–2021 |
| Fanta Quest | Local program | — |
| Masters of the Floors | Local program | — |
| Get The Facts | Post-pandemic weekly health panel program | c. 2020–2021 |
| Mapping the Guatemala Claim | Limited series on the Belize–Guatemala territorial dispute | 2019 |
| Powa & di People | Talk show | 2025 |
| Hurricane Iris: After the Storm | Documentary (VHS) | 2001 |
| The Land of Belize | Host: Therese Rath (VHS) | — |
| The Sea of Belize | Host: Tom Greenwood (VHS) | — |
| Belize: The Maya Heritage | Host: Froyla Salam (VHS) | — |
| From Invasion to Nation: A History of Belize | Based on Assad Shoman's 13 Chapters of a History of Belize (VHS) | — |

== Newsroom structure ==
Greater Belize Media operates under a newsroom convergence model — a media industry strategy that unifies previously separate editorial teams under a single structure to produce content across multiple platforms simultaneously. Introduced in 2024, GBM's model brought together the digital news department established in 2023 with the existing television news department into one integrated team operating with a digital-first approach. The "One Newsroom" is led by News Editor Isani Cayetano and Digital Editor Hipolito Novelo.

== Digital and social media ==
GBM operates across Facebook, TikTok, Instagram, and WhatsApp. Its Facebook page has over half a million followers, the largest of any media organization in Belize. The company also operates a WhatsApp channel and a Facebook Messenger channel for direct news distribution. GBM's website, greaterbelize.com, serves as the hub for news articles, video content, classifieds, obituaries, and community resources.

== Leadership ==
| Period | Name | Title |
|---|---|---|
| 1991–2008 | Stewart Krohn | Founder, Managing Director, News Director |
| 2008–2021 | Amalia Mai | Chief Executive Officer |
| 2021–present | Marleni Cuellar | Chief Executive Officer |

== Ownership ==
Greater Belize Media is the operating brand of Great Belize Productions Ltd. (GBPL), which received its broadcast license from the Government of Belize in 1991. In June 2008, GBPL was acquired by Belize Telemedia Ltd. (BTL). In August 2009, when BTL was nationalised by the Government of Belize, GBPL was detached from BTL and has operated independently of Telemedia since that date. A subsequent legal claim by BTL seeking recovery of GBPL was struck out by the Court of Appeal in March 2015.

== Affiliations and awards ==
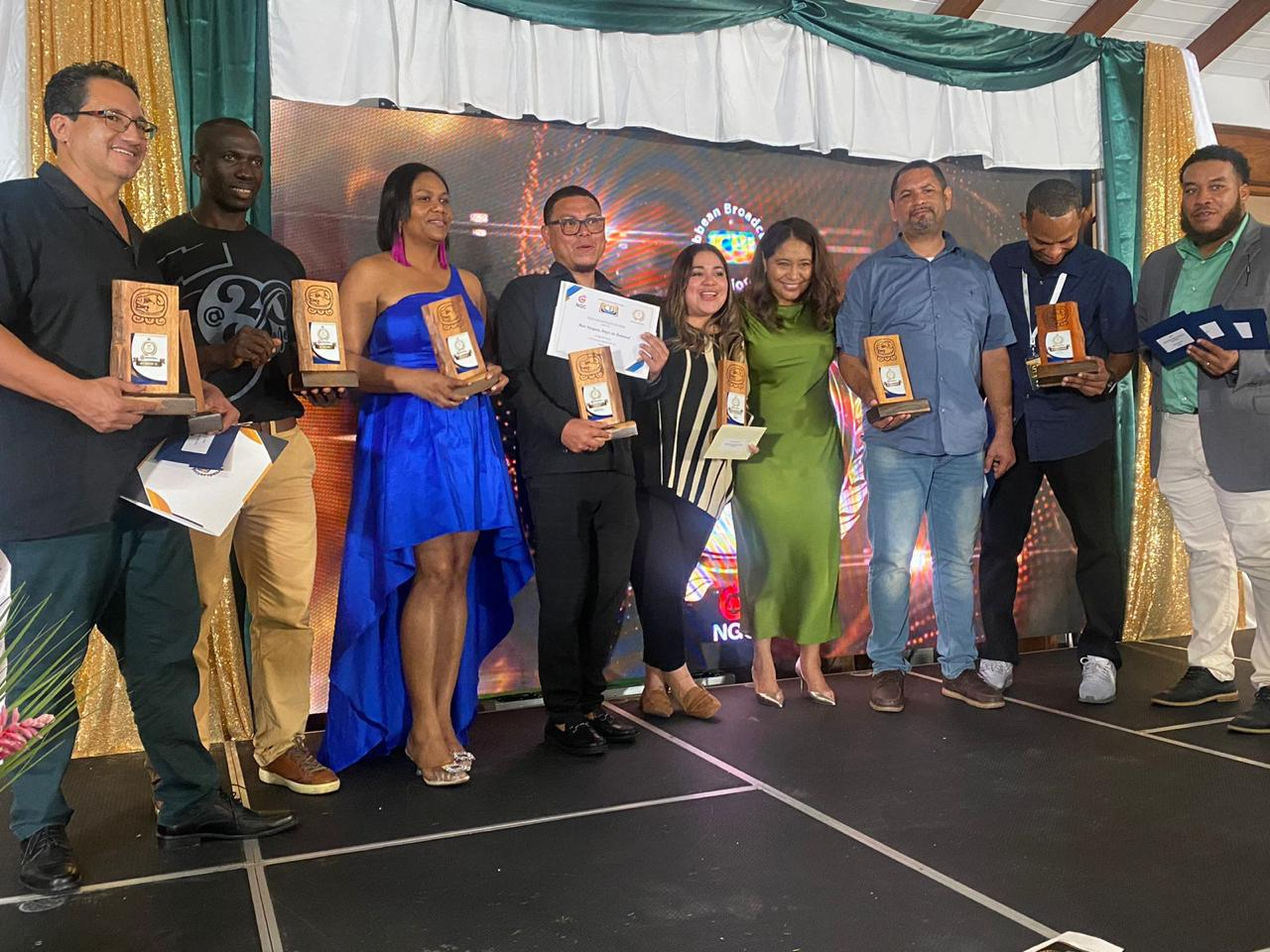
Greater Belize Media wins several awards during the 2024 CBU Awards

GBPL is a member of the Caribbean Broadcasting Union (CBU) and its subsidiary the Caribbean Media Corporation (CMC), the Public Media Alliance (PMA), and the Belize Chamber of Commerce. Since 1995, the company has been recognised annually by the CBU as one of the stations making the greatest contribution to regional programming. Over three decades of competition, GBM has accumulated numerous awards across journalism, documentary, production, advertising, and digital categories, with honours from organisations including the CBU, CNN, UNICEF, PAHO, FAO, IOM, and Oceana. GBM's leadership has held executive positions at the CBU across all three eras of the company's history — Stewart Krohn served as CBU President from 1999 to 2011, Amalia Mai served as Vice President, and Marleni Cuellar currently serves as Vice President. At the 36th CBU Media Awards (August 2025), GBM received twelve awards and three special mentions, with the Digital Department — established in 2023 — accounting for two of those wins.
