= STV Notícias =

- Country: Mozambique
- Broadcast area: Mozambique; Angola; Portugal

Ownership
- Owner: Grupo Soico
- Sister channels: STV

History
- Launched: 2014

Links
- Website: http://stv.co.mz/

STV Notícias is a 24-hour television news channel of the Mozambican television network STV (Soico Televisão), the first private Mozambican network which also owns the influential Mozambican newspaper O País (The Nation). It airs in the Portuguese language and it is available in cable and satellite. In Satellite it is available in Southern Africa, including Angola and parts of Europe, including Portugal.
