= Stewart Krohn =

Stewart Krohn is a Belizean television executive and journalist. He is the general manager of Great Belize Television, a subsidiary of Great Belize Productions, Ltd.

== Great Belize ==
Krohn formed Great Belize Productions, a video and distribution company, in 1982. GBP would eventually grow to produce a number of informative documentaries about Belize. He applied for and received a television license in 1991, forming what is now Channel 5.

Today, Krohn serves as News Director, Producer and GM of Channel 5. On occasion he also serves as a reporter, particularly on news of interest to the country.

Krohn has been honored regionally and internationally for his work. In May 1999 he scored News 5's third award from CNN World Report for a story on locally grown coffee.

== CBU ==
Krohn has served as President of the Caribbean Broadcasting Union, the local governing body for Caribbean journalism.
