= Televisão de Moçambique =

Public broadcaster of Mozambique

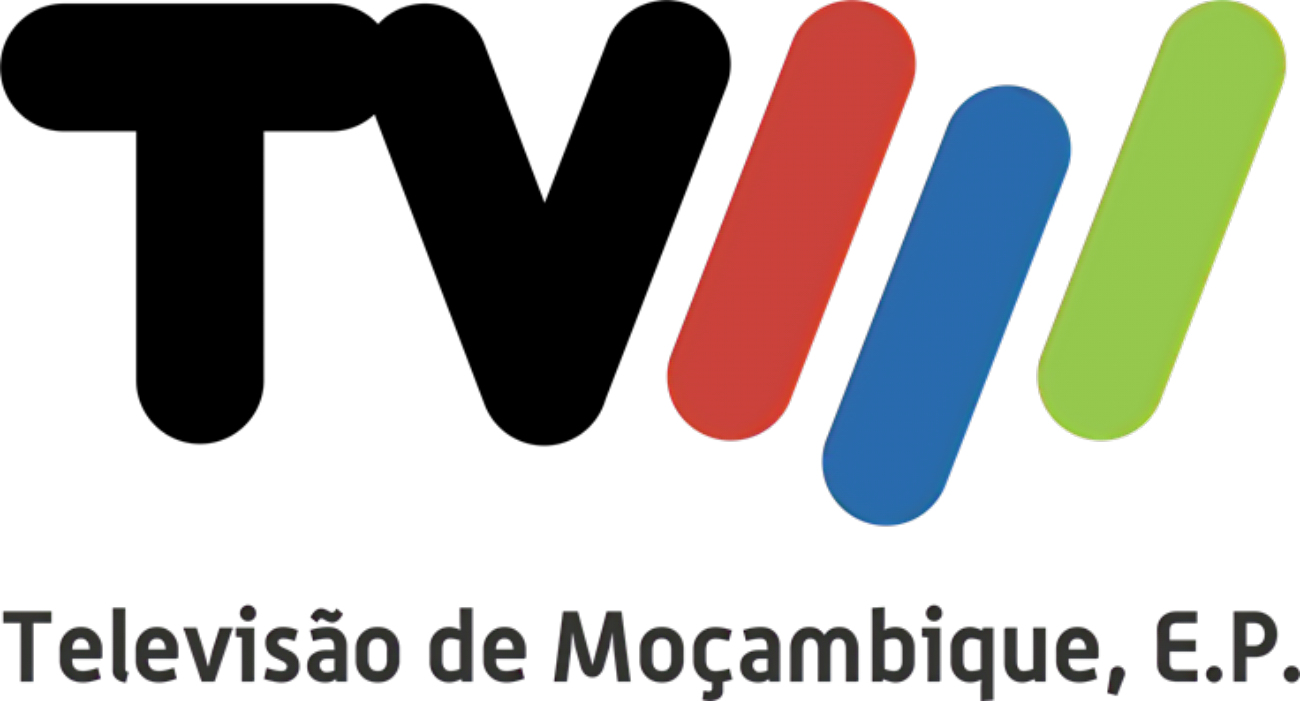
- Type: Broadcast television network
- Country: Mozambique
- Availability: National
- Founded: 3 February 1981
- Owner: Government of Mozambique
- Official website: www.tvm.co.mz

Televisão de Moçambique (TVM, lit. "Television of Mozambique") is the national public broadcaster of Mozambique. It is headquartered in Maputo, the country's capital.

The network receives 60 percent of its operational financing from the government and the remaining 40 percent from advertisers and other commercial sources.

== History ==
When Mozambique was under Portuguese control, Rádio Clube de Moçambique (the current Rádio Moçambique) had plans to start a television service. These were likely halted as an effect of the country's independence in 1975.

In August 1979, an Italian company set up a small improvised studio at the Maputo Internacional Fair (FACIM). It was nationalized in 1981.

The station was launched on 3 February 1981 as Experimental Television of Mozambique (Televisão Experimental de Moçambique) with experimental programming aired on Sundays only from 6:30pm to 10pm, on UHF channel 33 in Maputo. Gradually its broadcasting increased to the entire week (in 1986 it was broadcasting six hours a day and four days a week), achieving that goal in 1991. Color television was introduced in 1984. Its signal as of 1987 was still weak, whereas most FRELIMO officials who owned television sets opted to pick up stronger SABC TV signals from Johannesburg instead of the one from the Maputo transmitter.

The station broadcast its first Brazilian telenovela, O Bem-Amado, in 1986, followed by Roque Santeiro the following year. In September 1988 it covered Pope John Paul II's visit to Mozambique, with technical assistance from RTP.

In April 1992, a second center in Beira opened, in co-operation with RTP, who provided technical support in the development of the network due to a protocol signed in September 1989. A third center opened in Nampula in September 1994. Two further protocols were signed in June 1994 and September 1997. Subsequently, TVM was able to allow relays of RTP Internacional, whose terrestrial frequency was replaced by RTP África in 1998.

Television advertising was precarious in its early years, by 1993, alongside the liberalization of television, the creation of production houses and developments at the state broadcaster, more commercials were made locally.

In 1993, TVM started broadcasting to Beira, combining local programming with content flown in from Maputo.

The broadcaster was renamed Televisão de Moçambique in 1994, following the passing of Decree Nº 19/94, on 16 June that year.

Advancements at TVM caused the channel to reduce its reliance on content from local filmmakers and an increase in the reliance of foreign content from Portugal, Brazil and the USA on the cheap. This created a huge obstacle for national television, coupled by concerns that the new programming turned TVM into a "giant school of immorality and violence". Moreover, the arrival of RTP Internacional relays influenced TVM's style and standards. Despite the criticism received, in February 1997 TVM received a "rescue gesture" from the government, enabling the channel to have government subsidies. The agreement signed with RTP in 1995 already started paying dividends, laying ground for work for a new headquarters facility with hi-tech studios and a computerized news room.

In September 1998 TVM opened its Central Television Center in Maputo, which enabled the station to start broadcasting via satellite, reaching the entire country, from June 25, 1999. In the early 2000s, TVM had a staff of at least 200. The growth in TVM's audience also showed the concern that TVM would reflect "the real country". Around this time, football and Brazilian telenovelas dominated the schedule. A plan to implement programming in national languages began in August 1999. Following the resignation of Botelho Moniz, Arlindo Lopes became the new interim chairman of the company on 3 May 2000.

Thanks to the satellite signal (the satellite chosen at the time was Intelsat 804, with coverage in Africa and much of the Middle East and Europe), TVM was now broadcasting to eighteen television transmitters nationwide. Fiber-optic connection between transmitters started in 2001, starting from Beira, and continued in 2007 to connect all provincial capitals.

A satellite feed intended for the network was used by TVAfrica affiliate ITV in Tanzania at the beginning of the 2002 FIFA World Cup, having received a warning on 2 June 2002. TVM was one of TVAfrica's sports affiliates. TVM was still evaluating an agreement to carry UEFA Euro 2004, sublicensed from Mozambican rights holder STV (which, at the start of June, had inked a deal with Rádio Moçambique for authorized radio rights). STV was only available in Maputo at the time, and, if the agreement was not met, viewers outside the capital were set to be deprived of its coverage.

For its twenty-fifth anniversary, TVM adopted the tagline "Estamos todos aqui" (We're all here), which has been accused by locals at the time of cloning models from other channels, among them, RTP. When RTP in the following year celebrated its fiftieth anniversary, RTP included the anniversary logo to its channel bugs; TVM did the same for its 26th anniversary.

A second channel was on the cards in February 2008, with an initial target for June of that year, later delayed to 2010. TVM 1 would be an information channel, while TVM 2 would be an entertainment channel. TVM 2 launched on 8 March 2012. and was subsequently closed on 7 April 2017 with international service TVM Internacional taking its place, but on subscription television platforms (TVM2 was free to air).

== Provincial centers ==
TVM operates ten provincial television centers nationwide:

- Centro de Televisão Central (Maputo)
- Centro de Televisão Provincial da Matola (Maputo)
- Centro de Televisão Provincial da Sofala (Beira)
- Centro de Televisão Provincial de de Nampula
- Centro de Televisão Provincial de Quelimane (Zambézia)
- Centro de Televisão de Pemba (Cabo Delgado)
- Centro de Televisão Provincial de Lichinga (Niassa)
- Centro de Televisão Provincial de Inhambane
- Centro de Televisão Provincial de Chimoio (Manica)
- Centro de Televisão Provincial de Xai-Xai (Gaza)
