= Luso-American Development Foundation =

Portuguese development foundation (established 1985)

- Fundação Luso-Americana para o Desenvolvimento
- Formation: 1985
- Type: Foundation
- Purpose: scientific, cultural, educational
- Headquarters: Rua Sacramento à Lapa, 21
- Location: Lisbon, Portugal
- Coordinates: 38.7084°N 9.1630°W
- President: Durão Barroso
- Website: www.flad.pt

The Luso-American Development Foundation (Fundação Luso-Americana para o Desenvolvimento – FLAD) is a private, financially autonomous Portuguese foundation, established in 1985 by the Portuguese State. Its objective is to promote the development of Portugal, the Portuguese people, and communities of Portuguese descent through cooperation with the USA.

== Beginnings ==
FLAD's initial assets were constituted through funds made available by the Portuguese State, originating from the 1983 Cooperation and Defense Agreement between Portugal and the United States of America. As part of this agreement, the Portuguese government agreed to the use of military facilities by the American government, notably the continued use of the Lajes Field air base on Terceira Island in the Azores. The USA agreed to grant support to military, economic and other activities in Portugal, among which was the creation of the Luso-American Development Foundation. The Foundation is located in a building on Rua do Sacramento a Lapa in Lisbon. Prior to being occupied by FLAD it was extensively restored.

== Priority areas ==
FLAD's main goal is to contribute towards Portugal's development by providing financial and strategic support for innovative projects that foster cooperation between Portuguese and American civil society. Its initial endowments were €85 million and, since 1992, it has functioned exclusively with the income from its assets, which as of 2025 totalled around €150 million. Its priority areas are science and technology, education, art and culture, and transatlantic relations.

=== Science and technology ===
FLAD aims to contribute to the development and internationalisation of Portuguese science, for which the relationship with the United States is seen as vital. FLAD's strategy aims to facilitate Portuguese science through assisting students, researchers, scientists, and faculty. Its work includes programmes such as the Santa Maria Geodetic and Space Station (RAEG), a project for the installation of a network of geodetic and spatial stations in the Azores for the study of radio astronomy, geodesy, and geophysics. Also in the field of science, the foundation gives awards for scientific research that involve both Portuguese and American academics. These include a science award for mental health research, which in 2023 was given for the development of a clinical trial of treatment for cognitive-social symptoms of schizophrenia, in association with researchers in the US, and the Science Award Atlantic, which was awarded for research entitled "unravelling the role of emerging parasitic diseases in the structure and function of coastal communities and ecosystems".

=== Education ===
FLAD funds Portuguese academics to present papers in conferences in the US, with a grant of €1,200, and also funds US professors and researchers to participate in Portugal-based conferences. It supports internships in the US for Portuguese people who have recently completed a PhD. In association with the Fulbright Program, it also supports internships in the US for Portuguese master's-level students. Under the FLAD Prize in Political Science, annual grants are also given to two master's theses in the fields of political science and international relations, allowing the authors to participate in the annual congress of the American Political Science Association (APSA). Both American and Portuguese researchers are awarded grants to conduct their work at the Torre do Tombo National Archive and the National Library of Portugal. The foundation funds Portuguese studies programmes and centres in the USA. Together with the Portuguese Foundation for Science and Technology, it has sponsored the Center for Portuguese Studies at University of California, Berkeley since its inception. More recently, in 2015, FLAD, together with others, created the Study in Portugal Network (SiPN). This seeks to promote Portugal as an academic destination for US students and faculty.

=== Art and culture ===
FLAD has activities to strengthen the presence of Portuguese culture in the US and to promote the exchange of knowledge, artists and curators between the two countries. This includes grants for artistic residencies in the United States for Portuguese artists, or artists who have resided in Portugal for more than five years, aged between 25 and 35, to undertake a stay at a US institution. The support is available for a wide range of arts, including photography, film, jazz, literature, and visual arts. FLAD also has one of the most important contemporary art collections in Portugal. It supports modern artists with a programme to enable artists between 24 and 31 to hold a first solo exhibition.

=== Transatlantic relations ===
The foundation organises an annual Luso-American Legislators' Dialogue. This is a 2-day meeting in Lisbon with meetings between Portuguese-American legislators in the US (both at the state and federal level) and Portuguese people from various sectors. FLAD also funds different Portuguese community institutions in the US, such as CPAC (California-Portuguese Coalition of California), the Portuguese Beyond Borders Institute, and PALCUS (Portuguese American Leadership Council in the United States).

== Management ==
Durão Barroso, who was president of the European Commission for ten years between 2004 and 2014, and had previously served as Prime Minister of Portugal between April 2002 and July 2004, was appointed president of FLAD as from 15 January 2026. He replaced Nuno Morais Sarmento, who resigned for health reasons at the beginning of 2026.
