= Rádio Moçambique =

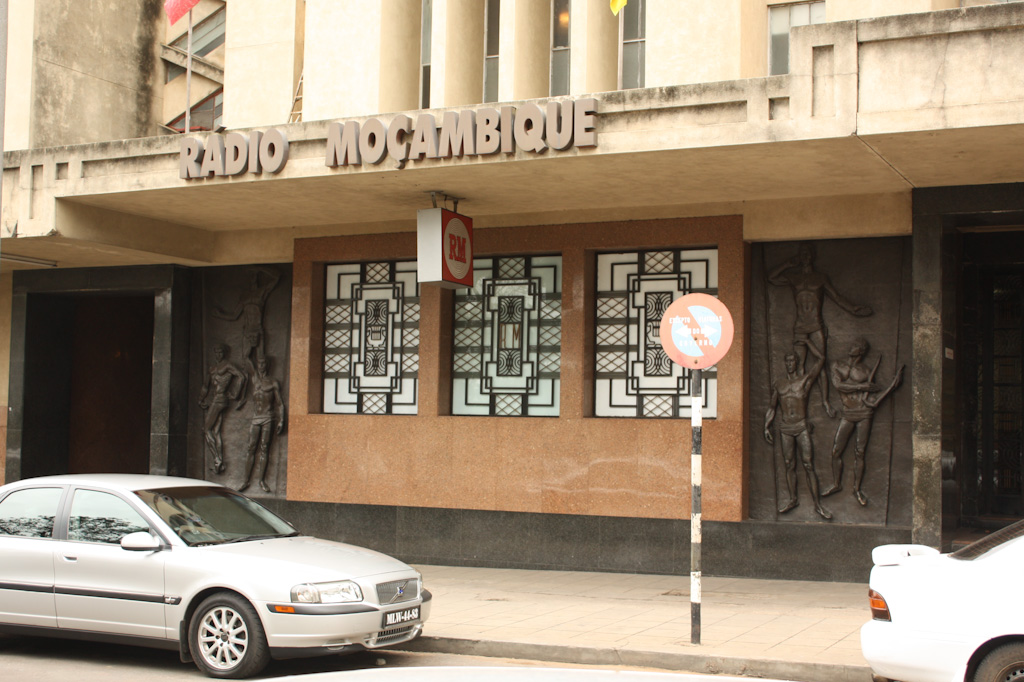
- Type: Public-service sound broadcasting
- Country: Mozambique
- Broadcast area: National
- Headquarters: Maputo

Ownership
- Owner: Government of Mozambique

History
- Launch date: 1932; 94 years ago

Coverage
- Stations: See below

Links
- Website: rm.co.mz

Antena Nacional
- Mozambique

Programming
- Languages: Portuguese discontinued Swazi; Afrikaans; English

Ownership
- Owner: Government of Mozambique

History
- First air date: 23 July 1932; 94 years ago

Rádio Moçambique is the state radio broadcaster of Mozambique. It operates three national radio networks, all coming out of Maputo, its capital.

== History ==
The company was formed as Rádio Clube de Moçambique in 1932, which was the main station of the Portuguese colony, owned by radiophiles A. Morais, Abílio Brito, Aniano Serra, Ernesto Brito and Augusto Gonçalves. Up until its arrival, listeners in Lourenço Marques only received South African broadcasts. The company was initially named Grémio dos Radiófilos da Colónia de Moçambique until 1937, per a 29 July decree. In its early years, it mainly broadcast Portuguese music and news bulletins, as well as to promote the colonial identity. In the late 1930s, it developed a stronger connection towards South Africa, with programming in English and Afrikaans, which resulted in increased advertising sales to the target country, as the Portuguese colonies did not gain enough finances.

The economical unbalance caused by World War II caused RCM's finances to decrease, especially between 1940 and 1943. The reopening of the South African market in 1946 increased its finances. A proposal to establish a dedicated radio station in English was mooted on 13 November 1948, in which Programa B would eventually become LM Radio.

=== 1974 attack ===
On 7 September 1974, following the signing of the Lusaka Accord, signed between representatives of the Provisional Government of Portugal and FRELIMO representatives, some settlers raided and took over the facilities of Rádio Clube de Moçambique, with the aim of contesting the terms of this agreement, and attempting, with the support of South Africa, the establishment of a white independence, based on the Rhodesian model.

They tried having the support of General António de Spínola, the President of Portugal at the time, since he had a different idea for the future of the Portuguese colonies in Africa.

However, these groups were unaware that in Lisbon, President Spínola had no political weight to counter the political movement which was underway to establish the accords for the immediate independence of the colonies, negotiating only with the nationalist movements that existed before 25 April 1974, who fought against colonialism.

=== Since 1975 ===
The current corporation was created on 2 October 1975, according to Decree-Lae nº 16/75, as a state organism, replacing the previous Rádio Clube de Moçambique. The name RM also gave way for a backronym slogan, "From Rovuma to Maputo" (Do Rovuma ao Maputo), emphasizing its national coverage.

One of its most iconic personalities in the early years of independence was Ernesto Edgar de Santana Afonso, alias Tio Turutão, who was responsible for children's programming on the radio network in the 1970s and 1980s, as well as the radio theatre series Unahiti - O Guerreiro and children's music, including the famous Bons Sonhos program, which was later aired on Televisão de Moçambique and was recently restored.

For nearly nineteen years, Rádio Moçambique operated as a state company, the status changed on 16 June 1994 to a public company.

On 2 October 1999, the English language station Maputo Corridor launched, followed by RM Desporto in 2003.

Beginning in June 2022, the main station was added to ZAP channel 603.

== Services ==
Rádio Moçambique is a public company with stations in all provinces. The main national station is Antena Nacional, entirely in Portuguese, while the provincial stations air programs in nineteen Bantu languages.

In Maputo, Rádio Moçambique also operates Rádio Cidade, an FM station geared towards entertainment, RM Desporto and the English service Maputo Corridor Radio.
