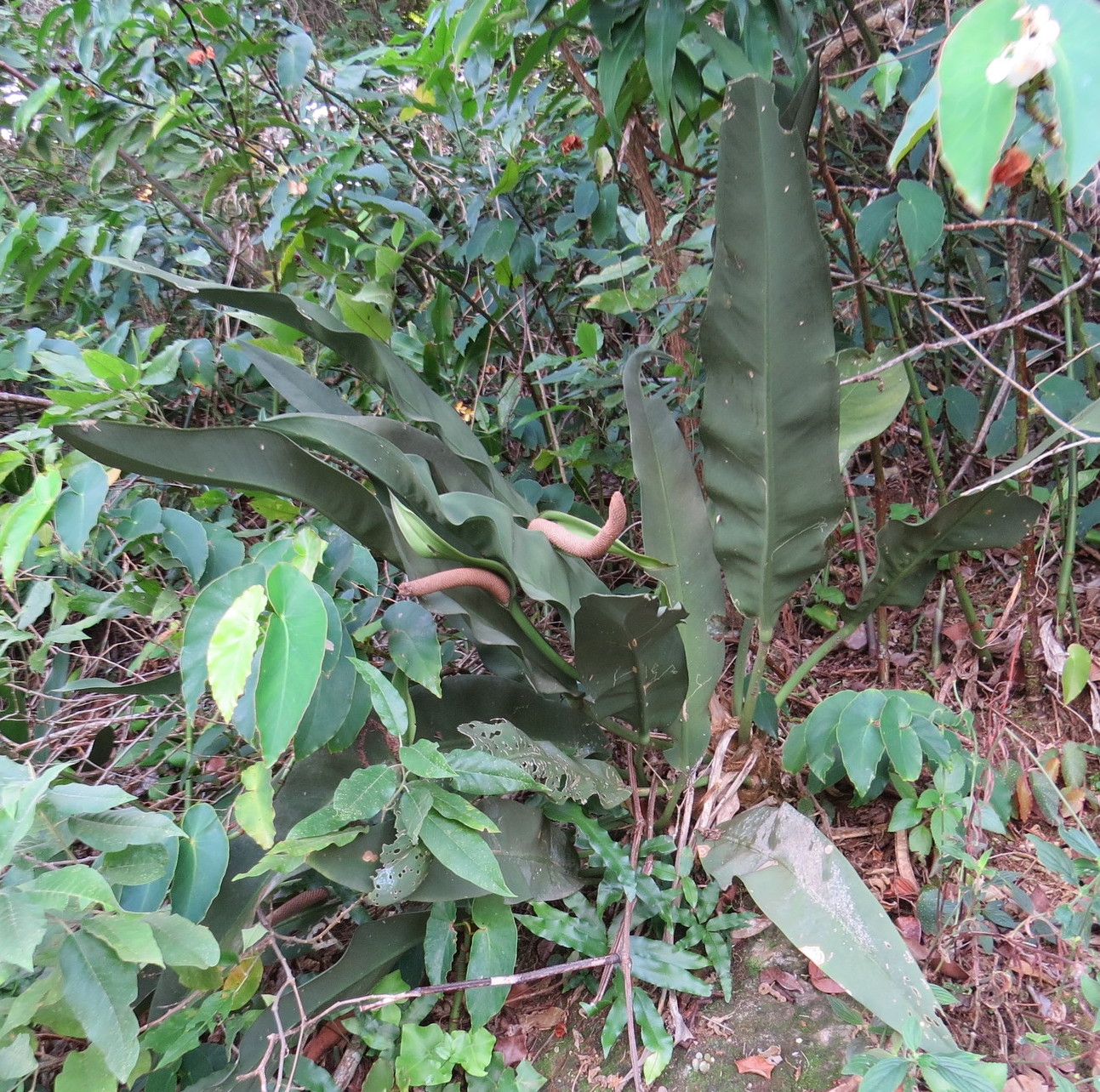
- Anthurium coriaceum growing in habitat in Rio de Janeiro

Scientific classification
- Kingdom: Plantae
- Clade: Tracheophytes
- Clade: Angiosperms
- Clade: Monocots
- Order: Alismatales
- Family: Araceae
- Genus: Anthurium
- Species: A. coriaceum

Binomial name
- Anthurium coriaceum G.Don

= Anthurium coriaceum =

Species of plant

Anthurium coriaceum is a species of plant in the genus Anthurium native to southeast Brazil. A "bird's nest" type of Anthurium of the section Pachyneurium, it grows either terrestrially or epilithically in areas of seasonal dryness. It has erect leaves that feel like leather, which is where its scientific name derives from (coriaceous meaning leathery).
