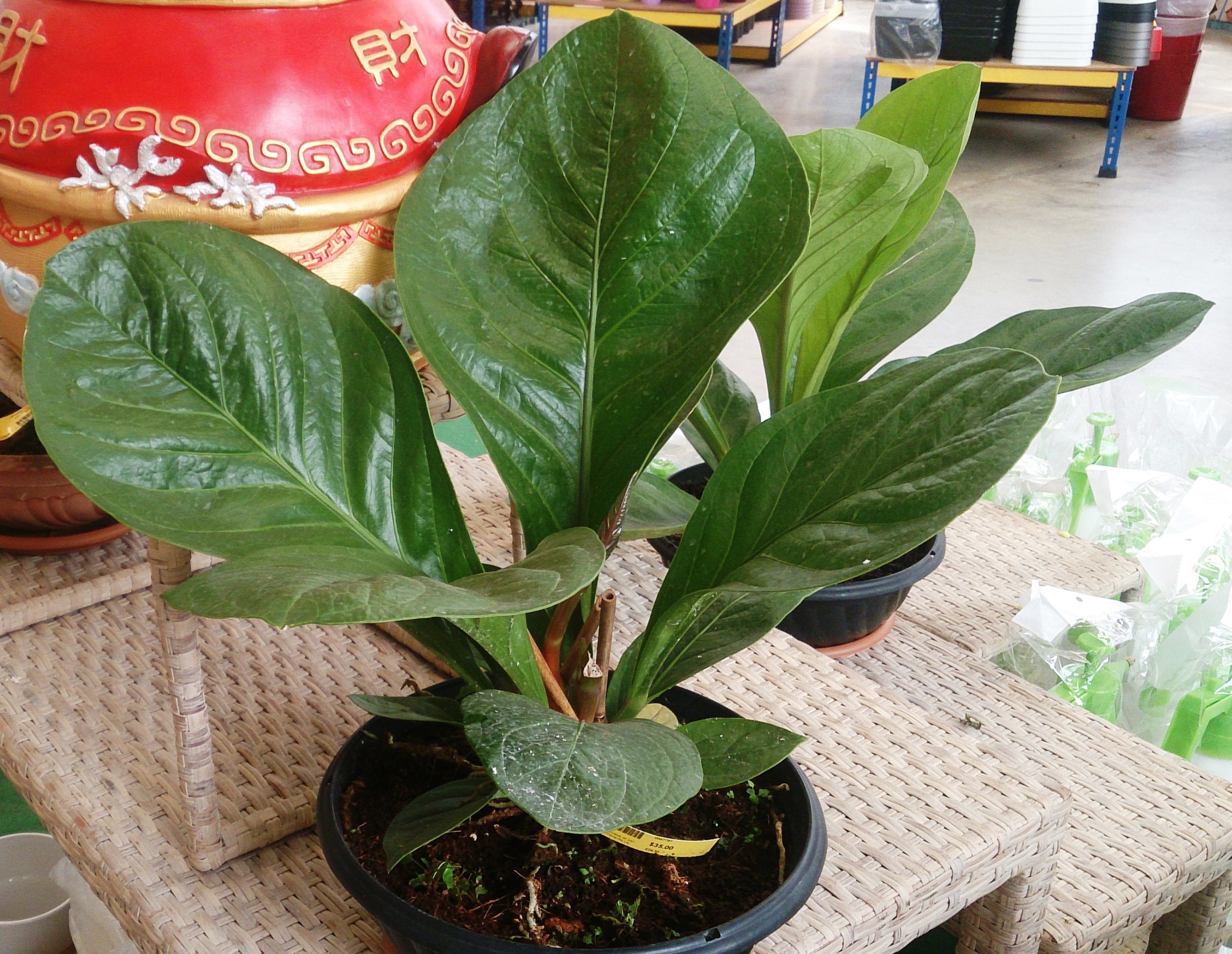
- An example of the plant grown in a pot.

Scientific classification
- Kingdom: Plantae
- Clade: Tracheophytes
- Clade: Angiosperms
- Clade: Monocots
- Order: Alismatales
- Family: Araceae
- Genus: Anthurium
- Species: A. jenmanii

Binomial name
- Anthurium jenmanii Engl.

Synonyms
- Anthurium englerianum G.S.Bunting; Anthurium trinitatis Engl.

= Anthurium jenmanii =

Species of plant

Anthurium jenmanii is a species of plant in the genus Anthurium. Growing as an epiphyte subshrub, it is native to South America from Trinidad and Tobago to Brazil. A member of the section Pachyneurium, and like related species it has a "birds nest" growth habit. It has a dark purple-black spadix and spathe, and produces red berries. In cultivation, it is commonly mistaken for Anthurium bonplandii subsp. guayanum, a related species.
