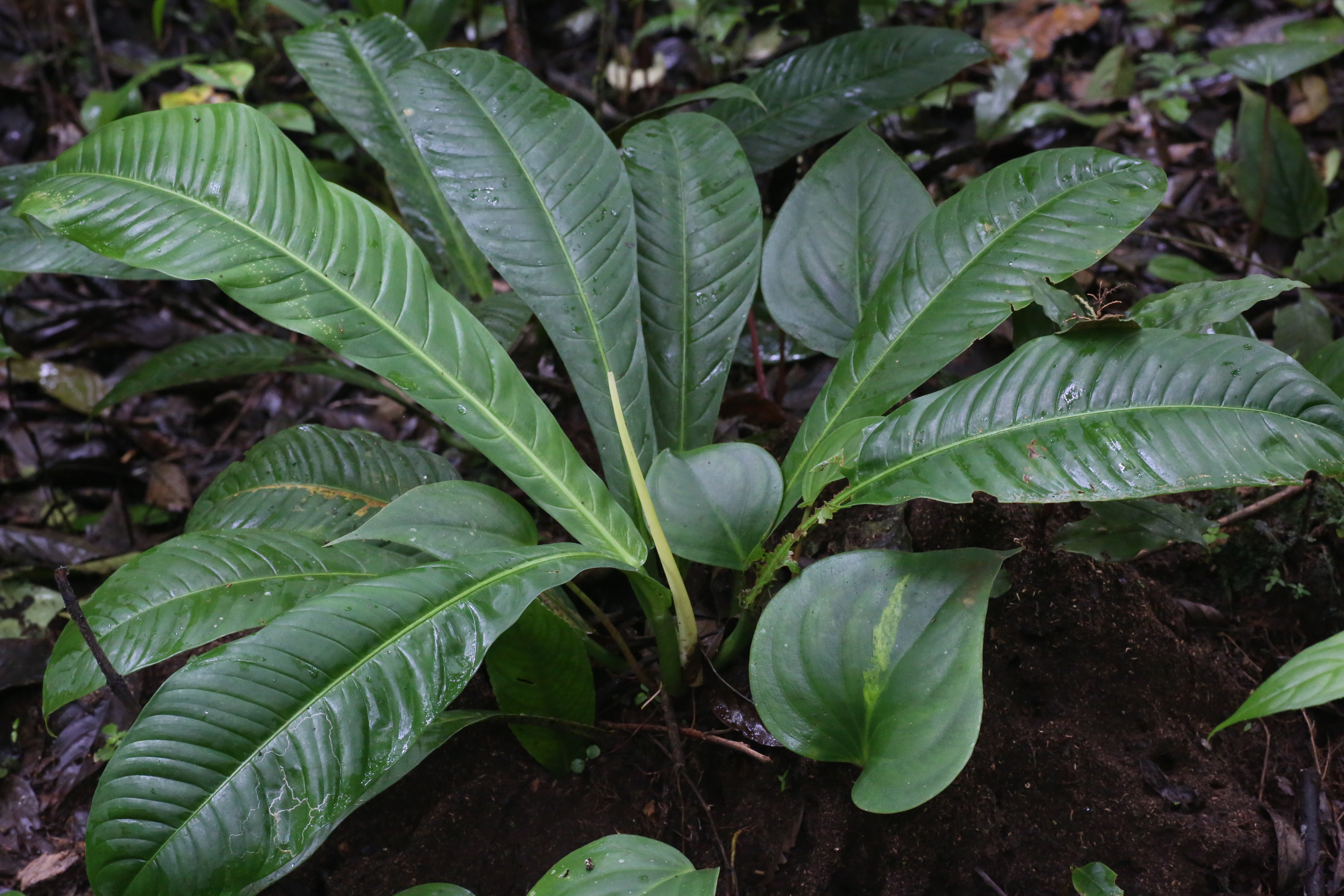

Scientific classification
- Kingdom: Plantae
- Clade: Tracheophytes
- Clade: Angiosperms
- Clade: Monocots
- Order: Alismatales
- Family: Araceae
- Genus: Anthurium
- Species: A. ernestii

Binomial name
- Anthurium ernestii Engl.

= Anthurium ernestii =

Species of plant

Anthurium ernestii is a species of plant in the genus Anthurium native to South America. Found from southern Colombia to Peru and western Brazil, it typically grows below 500 metres (1,600 ft).

A member of the Anthurium sect. Pachyneurium, it has the typical "birds nest" growth habit like others in its section. Anthurium ernestii is extremely variable, and may have various colors of berries and infloresnces. The species has two recognized varieties: Anthurium ernestii var. ernestii and var. oellgaardii. In Ecuador, it is used by the Shuar people for basketry and lashings.
