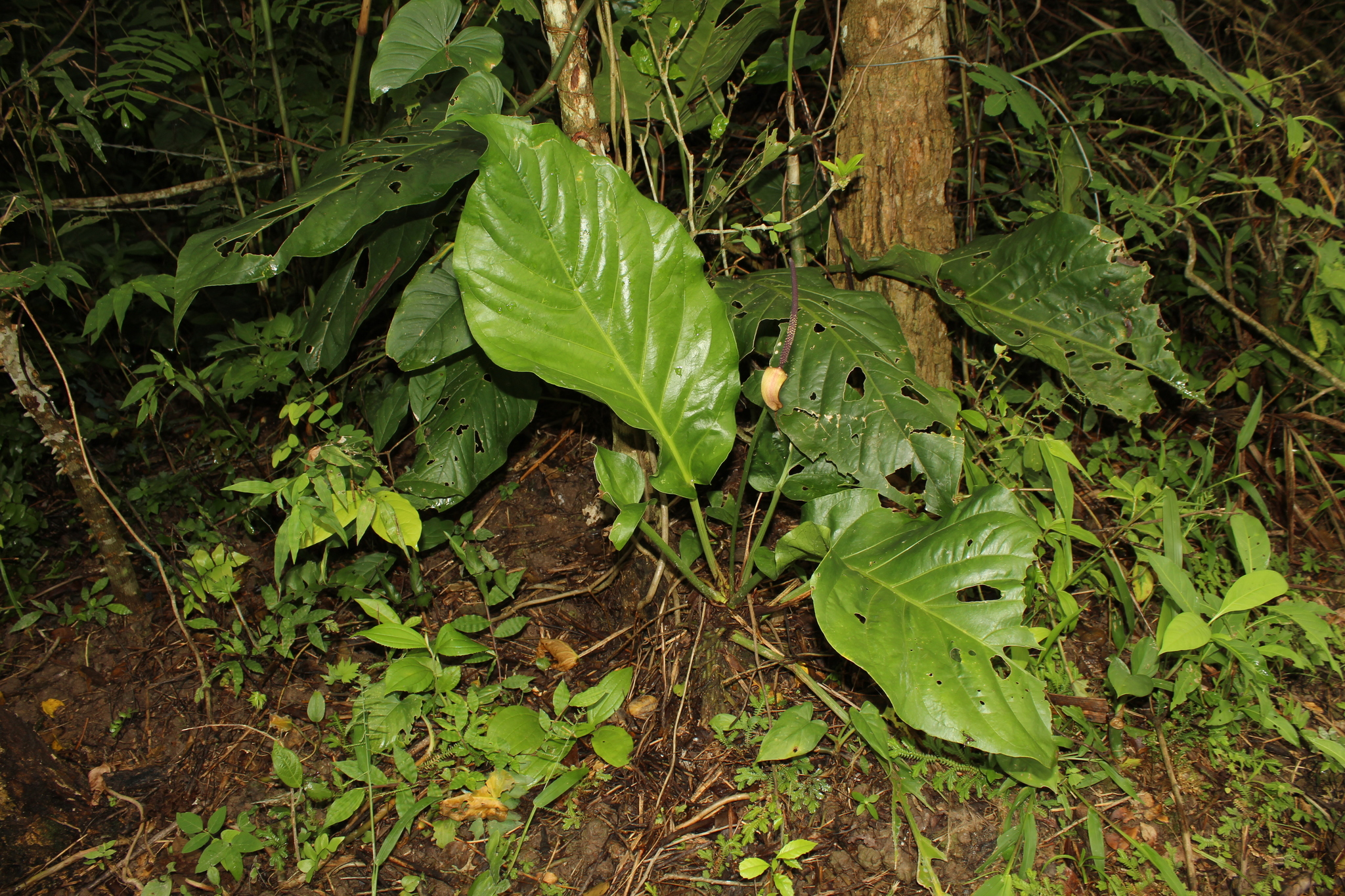
- Anthurium bonplandii in Colombia

Scientific classification
- Kingdom: Plantae
- Clade: Tracheophytes
- Clade: Angiosperms
- Clade: Monocots
- Order: Alismatales
- Family: Araceae
- Genus: Anthurium
- Species: A. bonplandii

Binomial name
- Anthurium bonplandii G.S.Bunting

= Anthurium bonplandii =

Species of plant

Anthurium bonplandii is a species of plant in the genus Anthurium native to South America. A member of the Anthurium sect. Pachyneurium, it grows terrestrially or occasionally epiphytic or epilithic. It is often confused with Anthurium jenmanii when young and Anthurium atropurpureum.

== Subspecies ==
There are several accepted subspecies.

- Anthurium bonplandii subsp. bonplandii, ranging from southeastern Colombia through Venezuela and Brazil
- Anthurium bonplandii subsp. guayanum, native to Venezuela, Guyana, and Suriname
- Anthurium bonplandii subsp. cuatrecasii, which grows from southeastern Colombia to western Venezuela, often on rocks
