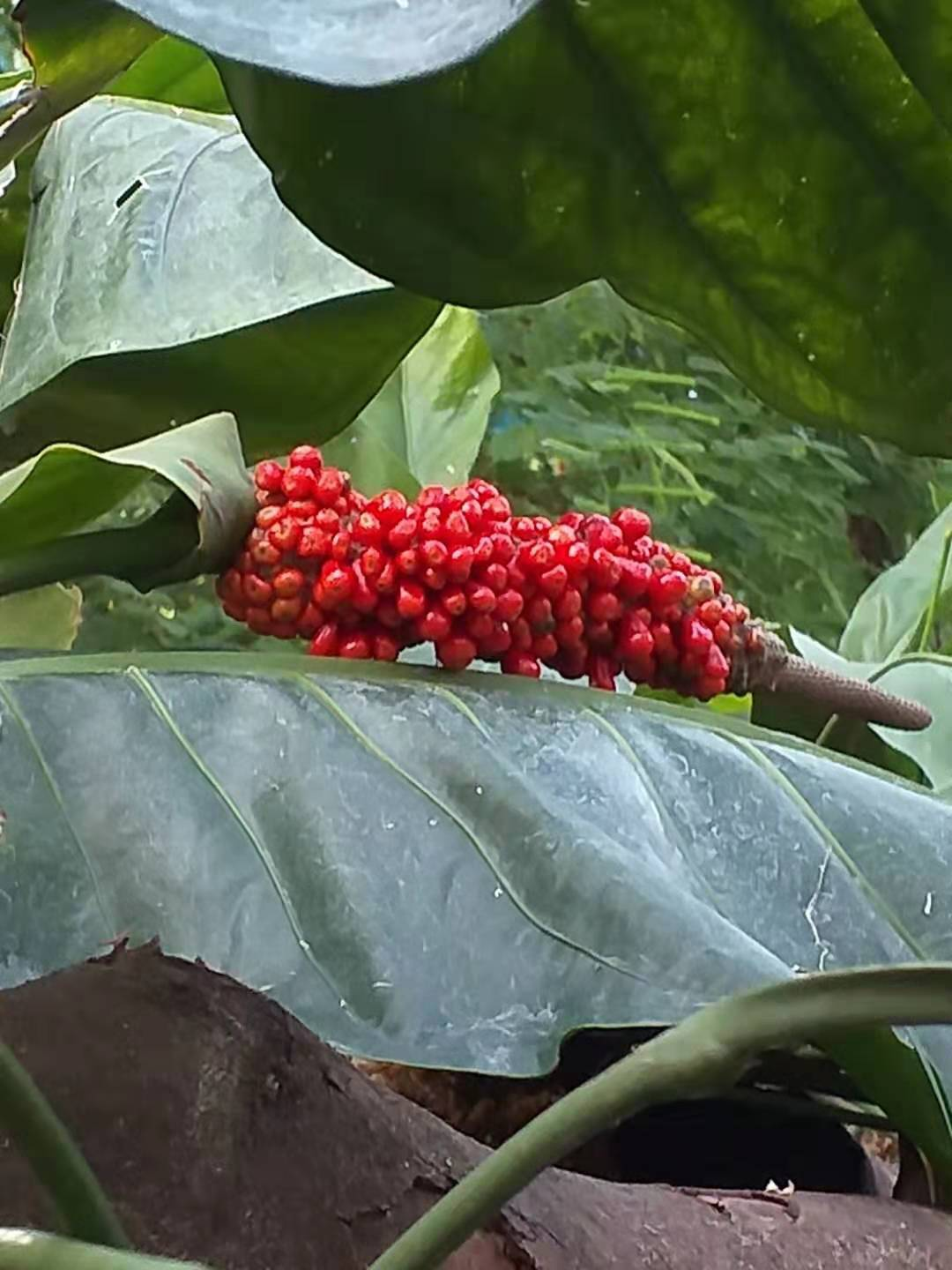
- Fruit
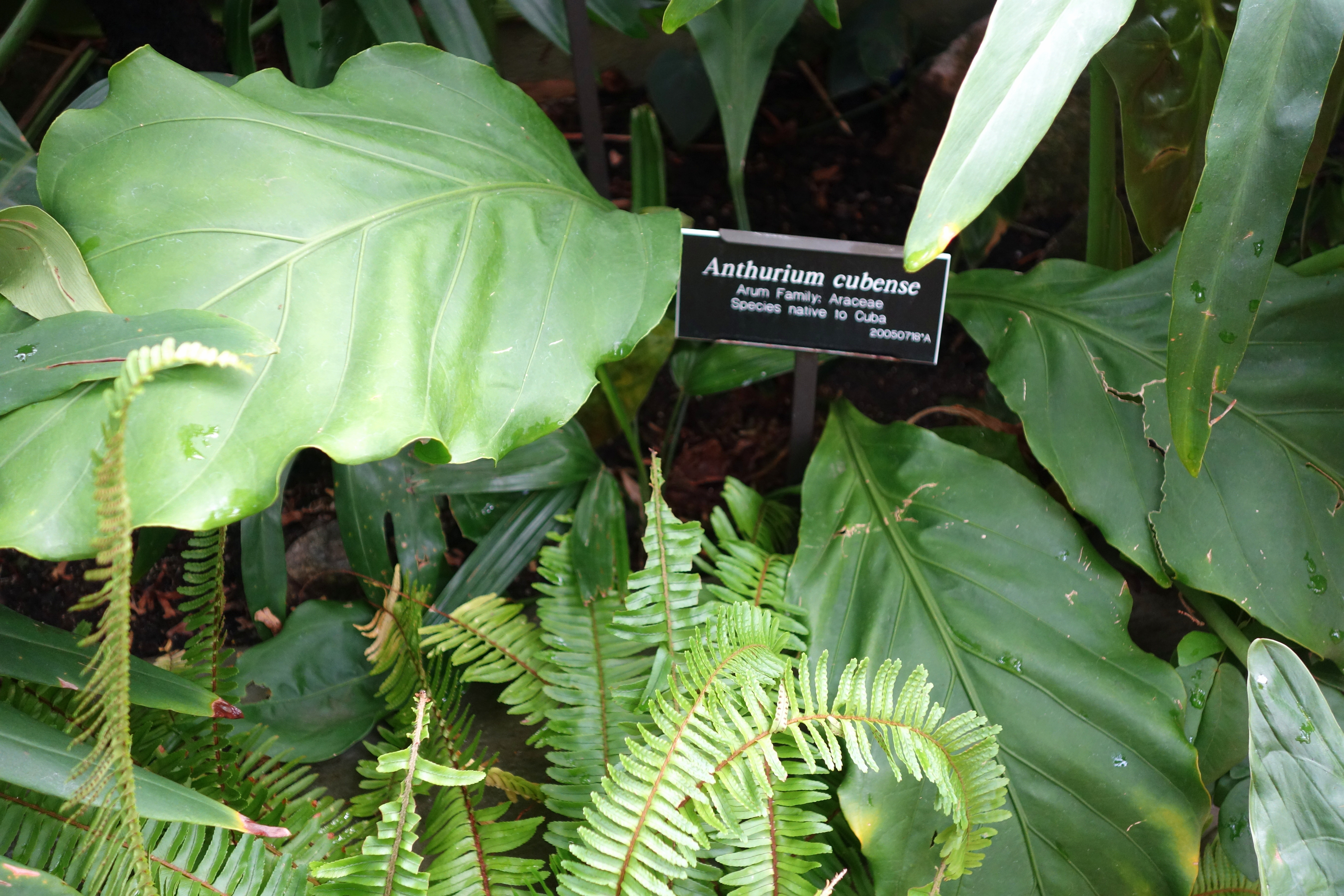
- At the Brooklyn Botanic Garden

Scientific classification
- Kingdom: Plantae
- Clade: Embryophytes
- Clade: Tracheophytes
- Clade: Angiosperms
- Clade: Monocots
- Order: Alismatales
- Family: Araceae
- Genus: Anthurium
- Species: A. cubense

Binomial name
- Anthurium cubense Engl.

= Anthurium cubense =

Species of flowering plant

Anthurium cubense is a species of flowering plant in the family Araceae, native to southeastern Mexico, Central America, Cuba, Colombia, and Venezuela. A large species, it is occasionally kept as a hothouse specimen or as a house plant. With Anthurium pendulifolium, it is a parent of the 'Big Bill' hybrid cultivar, with leaves exceeding 10 ft (3 m).
