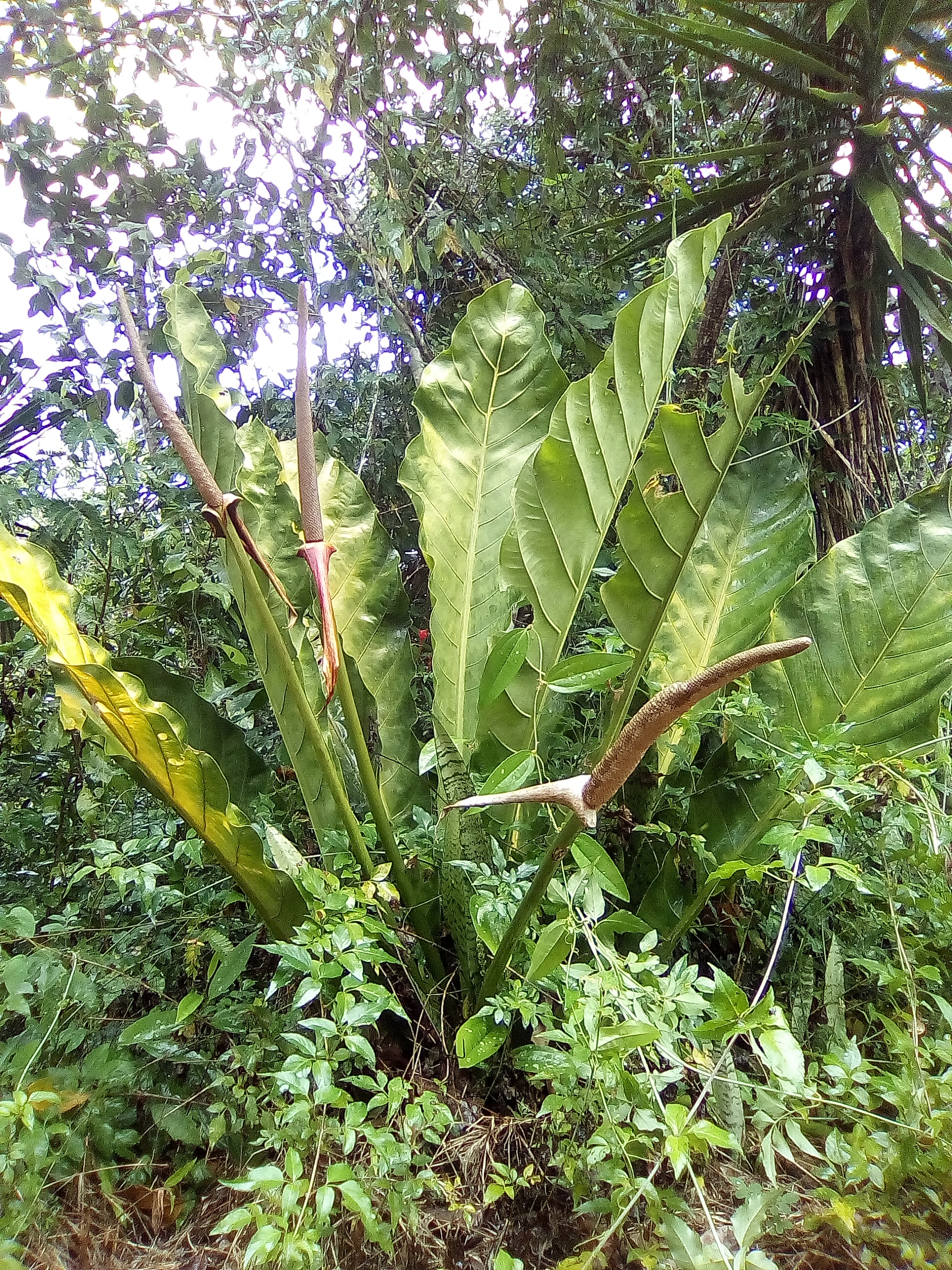

Scientific classification
- Kingdom: Plantae
- Clade: Tracheophytes
- Clade: Angiosperms
- Clade: Monocots
- Order: Alismatales
- Family: Araceae
- Genus: Anthurium
- Species: A. schlechtendalii

Binomial name
- Anthurium schlechtendalii Kunth

= Anthurium schlechtendalii =

Species of flowering plant

Anthurium schlechtendalii, also known as pheasant's tail or cola de faisán in Spanish, is a broad-leafed plant used for multiple medicinal purposes, including muscle and joint sprains, back pain, arthritis and rheumatism.

== Description ==
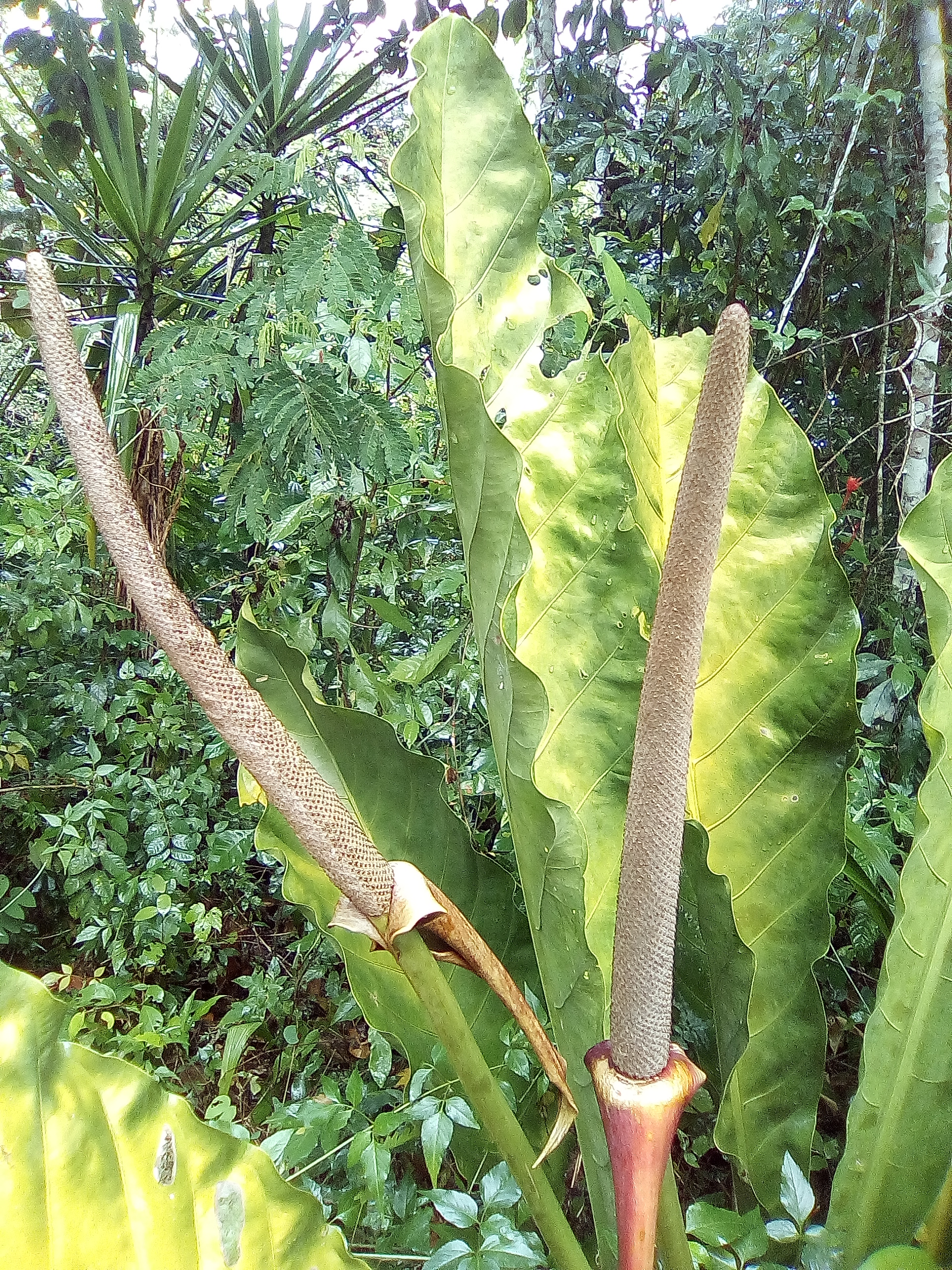
A. schlectendalii at Cayo District, Belize

Anthurium schlechtendalii is found from Mexico to Costa Rica. It is a large herbaceous plant with white aerial roots, dark green leaves, and a dark purple bract. Its fruits have a similar appearance to small red berries when ripe. A. schlechtendalii lives in wet forests, rocky hillsides or outcrops on trees.

A. schlechtenalii has a long, slender brown spadix that grows to about 70 centimetres (28 in) long. The spadix produces small flowers which, after being fertilized, develop into red berry-like fruits. The genus Anthurium has about 500 species, some are used as medicinal species meanwhile others are used as ornaments. The name Anthurium comes from classical Greek which translates to 'tail flower.' This species originated from Peru, Mexico, Bolivia, and Brazil.

== Treatment methods ==
For most treatments, three leaves of the plant are plucked, boiled in 2 gallons of water for 10 minutes, and used in a warm bath.

Local healers say that the cola de faisan can be used on swollen tonsils; for this the treatment the leaves are mashed with oil, heated, and placed on the neck two times a day. For cramps, muscle spasms or paralysis, the affected area is covered with a blanket and placed over the steam of the boiling decoction. To reduce swelling and inflammation, such as swollen breasts, back pain or joint pain, the leaves are mashed and applied to the affected area. The poultice "will stick to the affected part and can be worn all day".

For back pain or muscle spams, the center vein of the leaf is mashed and applied to the affected area, and a hot water bottle is placed over it for one hour. For urinary infection, roots of A. schlechtendalii are retrieved and boiled in 3 cups (~720 mL) of water for 10 minutes; then sips of the liquid are taken for 24 hours until the condition has improved.

The species is also used as a chilillo (when a dog is out of control): a handful of the roots is boiled in one quart of water for 10 minutes. 1/2 US pint (0.24 L) of the liquid is then fed to the dog three times a day until symptoms abate.
