= Anthurium pendulifolium =

Scientific classification
- Kingdom: Plantae
- Clade: Tracheophytes
- Clade: Angiosperms
- Clade: Monocots
- Order: Alismatales
- Family: Araceae
- Genus: Anthurium
- Species: A. pendulifolium

Binomial name
- Anthurium pendulifolium N.E.Br.

Species of plant

Anthurium pendulifolium is a species of flowering plant in the family Araceae. It is native to Colombia, Ecuador, and northern Peru. An epiphyte with spreading-pendant leaves reaching 205 cm (81 in) in length, it is typically found wet tropical forests at elevations from 90 to 550 m (300 to 1,800 ft). It is occasionally kept as a houseplant.
