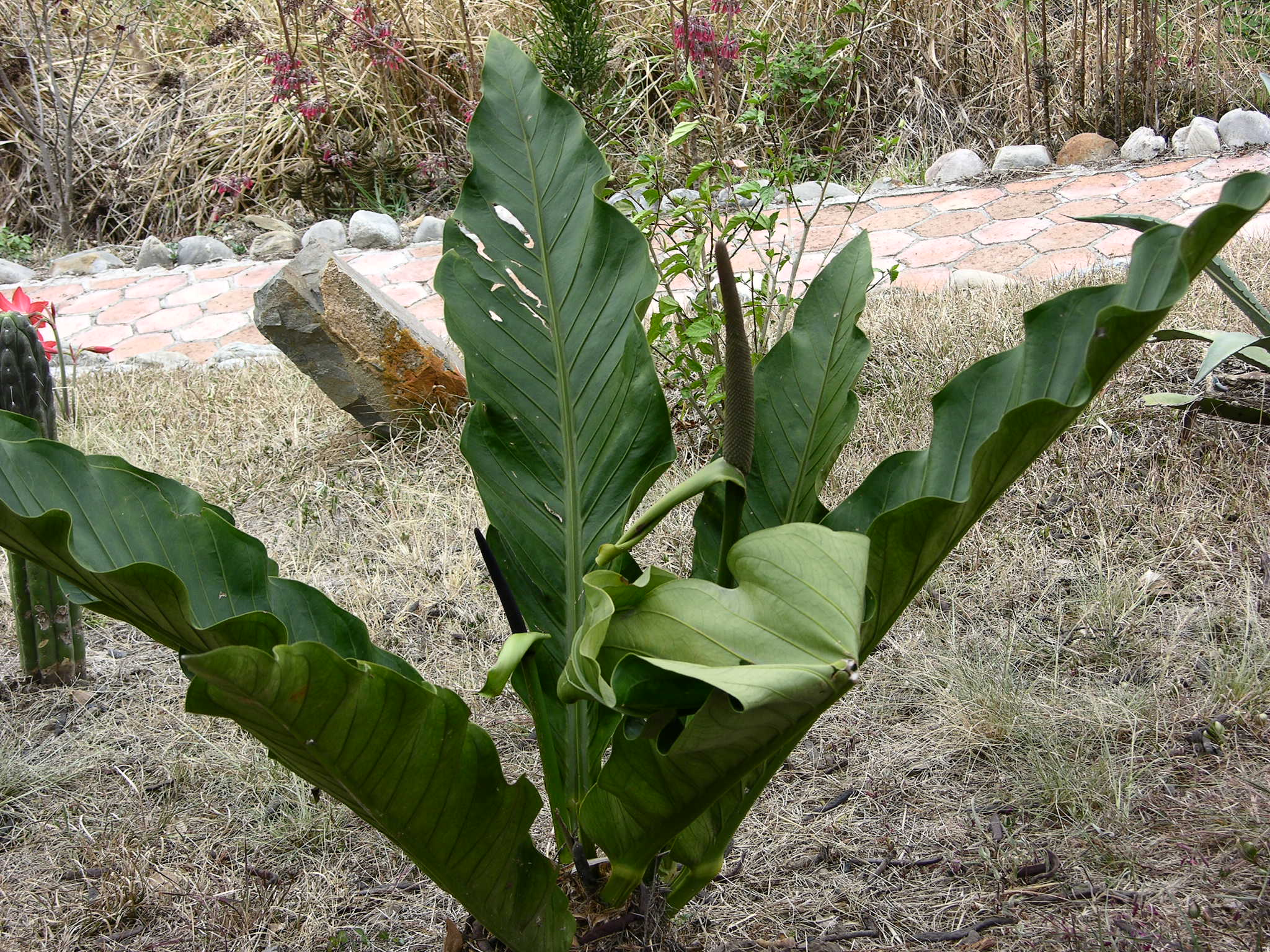
- A hybrid Anthurium belonging to Sect. Pachyneurium.

Scientific classification
- Kingdom: Plantae
- Clade: Tracheophytes
- Clade: Angiosperms
- Clade: Monocots
- Order: Alismatales
- Family: Araceae
- Genus: Anthurium
- Section: Anthurium sect. Pachyneurium

Species
- See text

= Anthurium sect. Pachyneurium =

Group of flowering plants

Pachyneurium is a section within the genus Anthurium. It is the largest section, containing the "bird's nest" Anthuriums. Plants of the section are terrestrial, with a rosette growth habit of dense, deeply rooted stems, and long lanceolate to oblanceolate leaves. Leaves are borne on short petioles and often have waved margins. The most notable characteristic is in the rolling of new leaves. Anthurium of all other sections are rolled in a simple spiral, resembling a conch shell; those of Pachyneurium are rolled in two opposite spirals towards the central rib of the leaf.

The birdsnest form of these Anthuriums means that they trap debris and water quite efficiently in the plant base; this adaptation is a response to living in very arid climates. As such, they rarely appear in wet forest environments, where other Anthurium sections are frequent inhabitants. Typical plants of the section include Anthurium affine, A. cubense and A. schlechtendalii.
