= List of municipalities in Belize =

Map of Central America with Belize highlighted

Belize has 247 recognized municipalities, consisting of 2 cities, 7 towns, and 238 villages. Each type of municipality has a different form of government as defined by Title VIII of the Laws of Belize. The largest municipality by population in Belize is Belize City with a population of 57,164. The smallest municipalities by population are the villages of Estrella and Honey Camp, each with 37 residents.

== Cities and towns ==
There are two cities (Belize City and Belmopan) and seven towns in Belize. As of 2000, the seven towns are Benque Viejo del Carmen, Corozal Town, Dangriga, Orange Walk Town, Punta Gorda, San Ignacio & Santa Elena, and San Pedro.

City and town councils consist of a mayor and a number of councillors (ten in Belize City, six in Belmopan and the towns). Mayors and councillors are directly elected to three-year terms, using the first past the post system. The mayor (except in Belize City) acts as the chief executive of the city or town, and allocates portfolios to the other councillors.

City and town councils have a wide range of functions. According to the Government of Belize website, "urban authorities are responsible for street maintenance and lighting, drains, refuse collection and public cemeteries. They also have discretionary powers over other services including infrastructure, parks and playgrounds, markets and slaughter-houses, public libraries, public buildings and the amenities of the city or town centre."

== Villages ==
Villages in Belize are typically governed by a village council. Village councils began in the 1950s and were formalized by the Village Councils Act 1999 which legalized their role and authority to administer village affairs. Villages are declared by ministerial order and one qualification for village status is a minimum of 200 voters. The council is required to meet at least once every quarter and has discretionary powers to appoint committees. Decisions of village committees are subject to the approval of their council. There are over 180 village councils in Belize. Village councils consist of a chairperson and six councillors, who are directly elected by registered villagers. Village councils have existed in Belize on an informal basis since the 1950s, but they were first put on a statutory footing by the Village Councils Act 1999. After the Act came into force, the first elections for village councils were held in March and April 2001. Village councils have a more limited range of functions than town councils. They "encourage and assist co-operation on economic and social development and general welfare", and can run community centres and advise the national government on the affairs of the locality.

Some rural villages in Belize have an alcalde: a local magistrate who has both an administrative and a judicial role. In addition to presiding over local courts, alcaldes are responsible for managing communal land and act as school officers. This form of local governance is practised mainly in Mayan communities in Belize, but any rural community can choose to appoint an alcalde.

Mennonite villages run mostly on annually elected committees consisting of a Vorsteher and up to 3 committee members for terms of 3-5 years.

== List of municipalities ==
Largest cities, towns, and villages in Belize by population

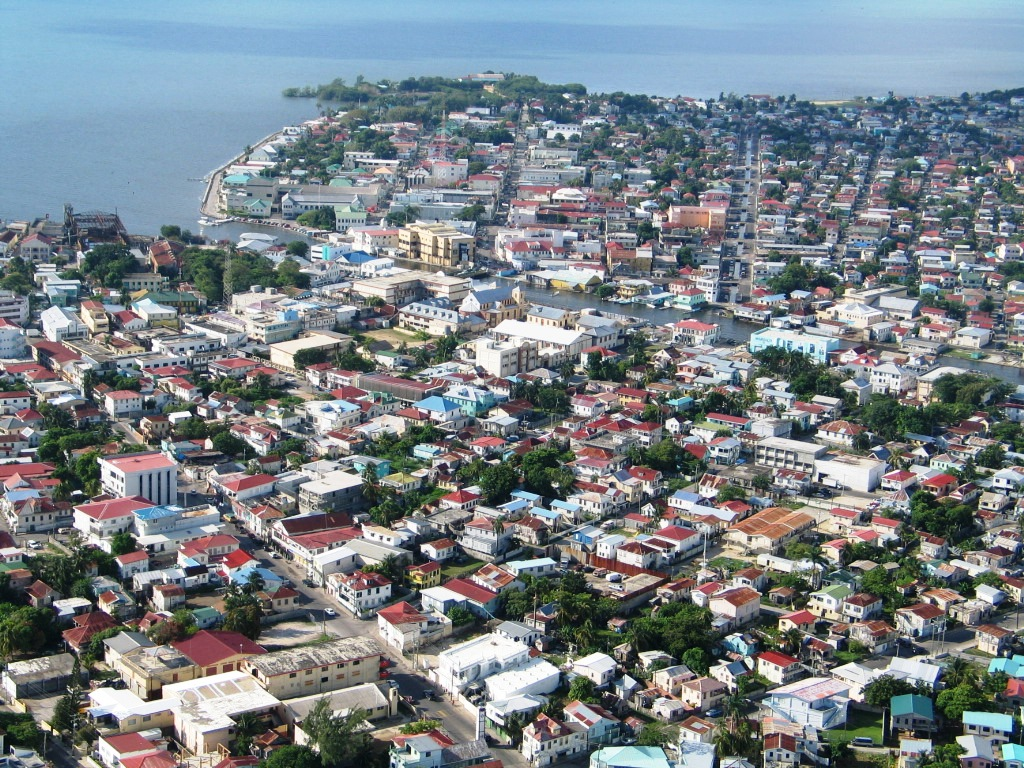
Aerial view of Belize City, the largest local municipality in Belize

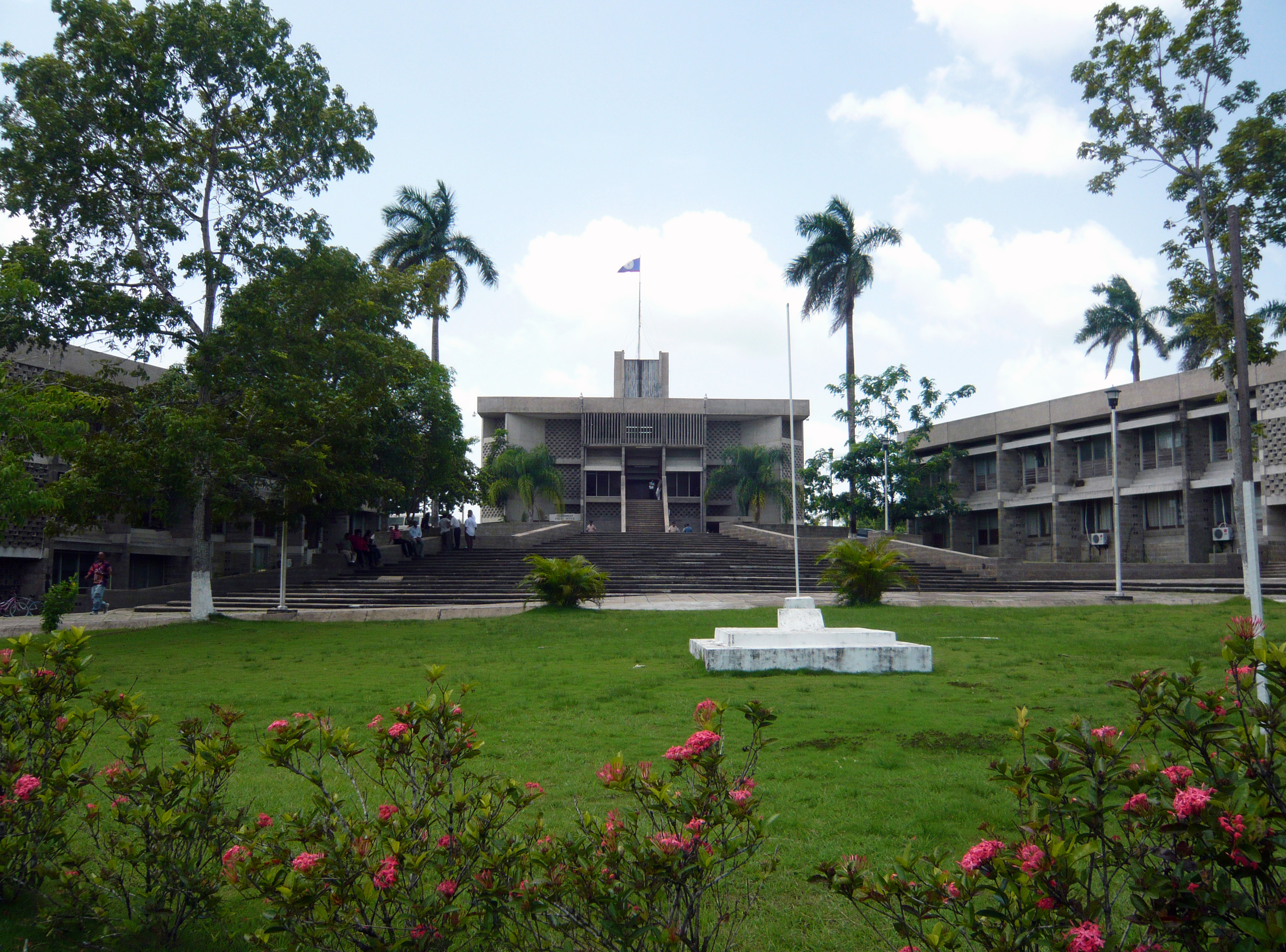
Parliament in Belmopan, Belize's capital city and second largest municipality by population since 2018.

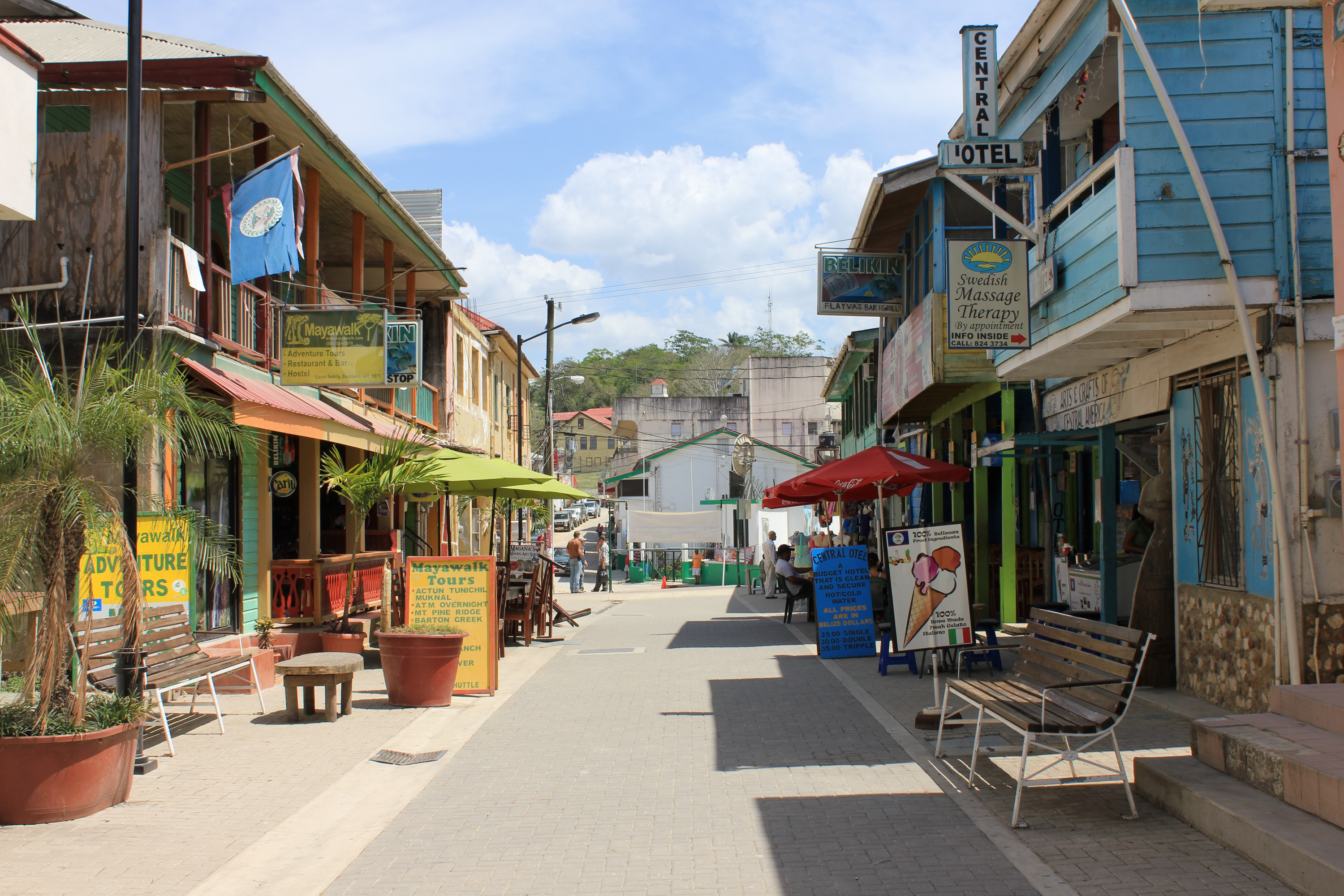
San Ignacio/Santa Elena, Belize's third largest municipality by population, second largest up to 2018

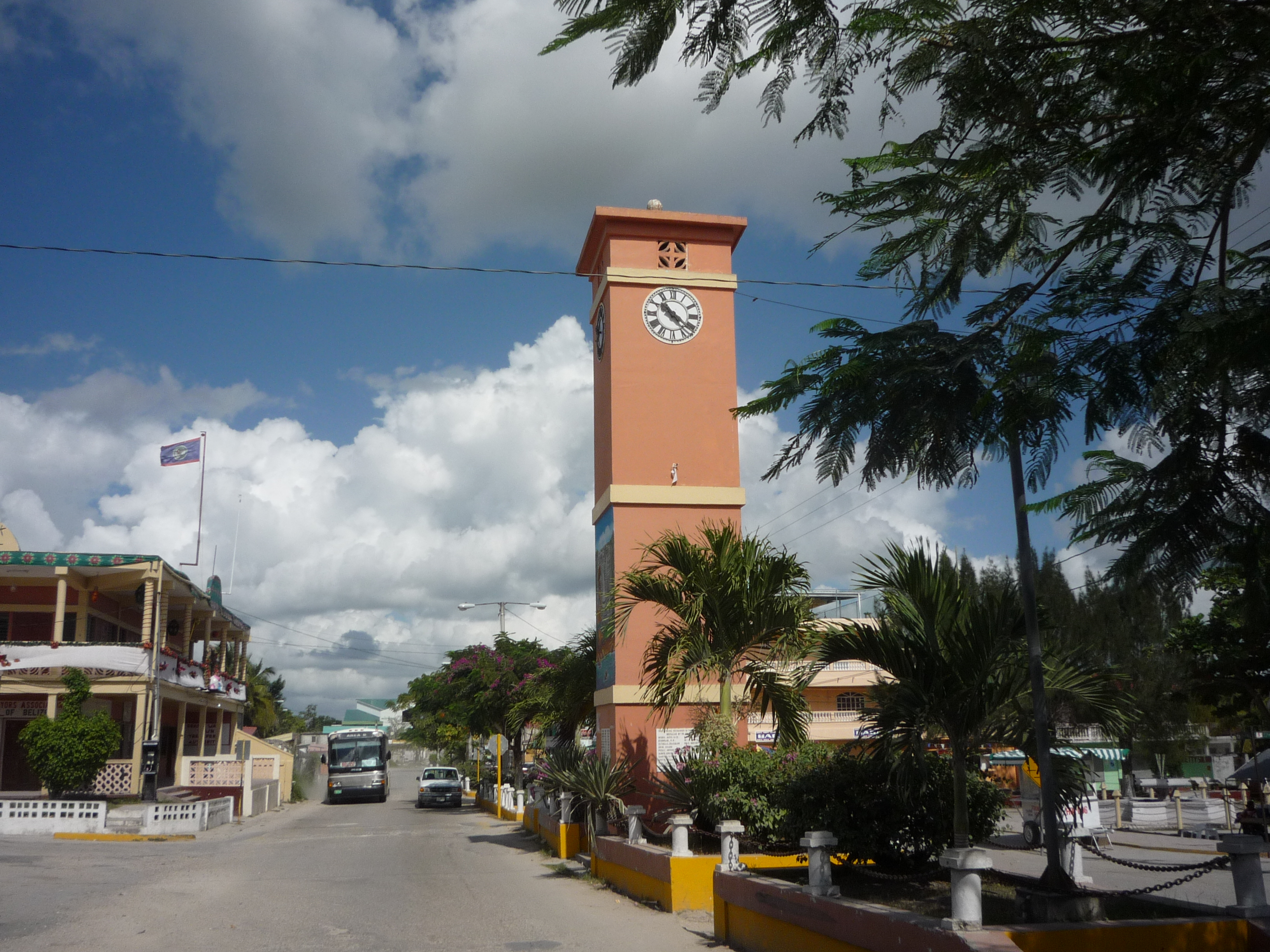
Orange Walk Town is the fourth largest municipality by population in Belize

Name	Type	District	Population (2010)	Population (2000)	Change
Belize City	City	Belize	57,164	51,085	+11.9%
Bermudian Landing	Village	Belize	183	214	−14.5%
Biscayne	Village	Belize	517	386	+33.9%
Bomba	Village	Belize	71	91	−22.0%
Boston	Village	Belize	127	146	−13.0%
Burrell Boom	Village	Belize	2,218	1,204	+84.2%
Caye Caulker	Village	Belize	1,763	706	+149.7%
Corozalito	Village	Belize	84	94	−10.6%
Crooked Tree	Village	Belize	805	697	+15.5%
Double Head Cabbage	Village	Belize	406	405	+0.2%
Flowers Bank	Village	Belize	121	110	+10.0%
Freetown Sibun	Village	Belize	78	82	−4.9%
Gales Point	Village	Belize	297	277	+7.2%
Gardenia	Village	Belize	303	286	+5.9%
Gracie Rock	Village	Belize	255	195	+30.8%
Hattieville	Village	Belize	2,344	1,642	+42.8%
Isabella Bank	Village	Belize	143	139	+2.9%
La Democracia	Village	Belize	353	56	+530.4%
Ladyville	Village	Belize	5,458	3,891	+40.3%
Lemonal	Village	Belize	169	0 (Note: Population figures for this municipality are not available in the 2000 census.)	NA
Lord's Bank	Village	Belize	3,140	1,233	+154.7%
Lucky Strike	Village	Belize	244	120	+103.3%
Mahogany Heights	Village	Belize	1,063	0	NA
Maskall	Village	Belize	803	656	+22.4%
May Pen	Village	Belize	50	66	−24.2%
Mile 25 Village	Village	Belize	69	0	NA
Rancho Dolores	Village	Belize	217	192	+13.0%
Rock Stone Pond	Village	Belize	154	0	NA
San Pedro	Town	Belize	11,767	4,268	+175.7%
Sandhill	Village	Belize	1,842	1,385	+33.0%
Santana	Village	Belize	104	140	−25.7%
Scotland Halfmoon	Village	Belize	259	81	+219.8%
St. Ann's	Village	Belize	97	0	NA
St. George's Caye	Village	Belize	656	0	NA
St. Paul's Bank	Village	Belize	153	301	−49.2%
Western Paradise/West Lake/8 Miles	Village	Belize	1,258	0	NA
Willows Bank	Village	Belize	185	175	+5.7%
Armenia	Village	Cayo	1,395	682	+104.5%
Belmopan	City	Cayo	13,919	5,089	+173.5%
Benque Viejo del Carmen	Town	Cayo	6,148	5,419	+13.5%
San Ignacio	Town	Cayo	10,490	0 (Note: The 2000 census lists the population of San Ignacio as 13,542 which includes the sister city of Santa Elena.)	NA
Santa Elena	Town	Cayo	7,389	0	NA
Arenal	Village	Cayo	613	475	+29.1%
Lower Barton Creek	Village	Cayo	193	0 (Note: The 2000 census lists the population of Barton creek as 508.)	NA
Billy White	Village	Cayo	586	258	+127.1%
Blackman Eddy	Village	Cayo	533	435	+22.5%
Branch Mouth	Village	Cayo	127	275	−53.8%
Buena Vista	Village	Cayo	599	306	+95.8%
Bullet Tree Falls	Village	Cayo	2,124	1,376	+54.4%
Calla Creek	Village	Cayo	286	248	+15.3%
Camalote	Village	Cayo	2,562	1,376	+86.2%
Central farm	Village	Cayo	205	199	+3.0%
Cotton Tree	Village	Cayo	1,573	865	+81.8%
Cristo Rey	Village	Cayo	874	735	+18.9%
Duck Run I	Village	Cayo	663	0 (Note: The 2000 census lists the population of Duck Run as 767.)	NA
Duck Run II	Village	Cayo	370	0	NA
Duck Run III	Village	Cayo	400	0	NA
Esperanza	Village	Cayo	1,262	1,154	+9.4%
Franks Eddy	Village	Cayo	378	212	+78.3%
Georgeville	Village	Cayo	922	573	+60.9%
La Gracia	Village	Cayo	271	110	+146.4%
Los Tambos	Village	Cayo	358	172	+108.1%
More Tomorrow	Village	Cayo	154	128	+20.3%
Ontario	Village	Cayo	775	621	+24.8%
Paslow Falls/Plant	Village	Cayo	194	0 (Note: The 2000 census lists the population of Paslow Falls - Plant Sucker - Remanzo as 339.)	NA
Roaring Creek	Village	Cayo	1,974	1,749	+12.9%
Ringtail Village	Village	Cayo	187	0	NA
San Antonio	Village	Cayo	1,847	1,491	+23.9%
San Jose Succotz	Village	Cayo	2,322	1,927	+20.5%
San Marcos	Village	Cayo	142	0	NA
Santa Familia	Village	Cayo	1,597	907	+76.1%
Santa Marta	Village	Cayo	1,136	711	+59.8%
Santa Rosa	Village	Cayo	64	104	−38.5%
Santa Teresita	Village	Cayo	83	0	NA
Selena	Village	Cayo	201	190	+5.8%
Seven Miles	Village	Cayo	482	0	NA
Spanish Lookout	Village	Cayo	2,253	1,899	+18.6%
Springfield	Village	Cayo	270	0	NA
St. Matthews	Village	Cayo	1,153	541	+113.1%
Teakettle	Village	Cayo	1,746	1,362	+28.2%
Unitedville	Village	Cayo	971	593	+63.7%
Upper Barton Creek	Village	Cayo	380	0	NA
Valley of Peace	Village	Cayo	2,111	1,894	+11.5%
Yalbac	Village	Cayo	131	56	+133.9%
Corozal Town	Town	Corozal	10,287	7,986	+28.8%
Altamira	Village	Corozal	210	0	NA
Buena Vista	Village	Corozal	494	419	+17.9%
Calcutta	Village	Corozal	846	813	+4.1%
Caledonia	Village	Corozal	1,400	1,329	+5.3%
Carolina	Village	Corozal	206	175	+17.7%
Chan Chen	Village	Corozal	715	627	+14.0%
Chunox	Village	Corozal	1,375	1,113	+23.5%
Concepción	Village	Corozal	1,256	940	+33.6%
Consejo	Village	Corozal	351	228	+53.9%
Copper Bank	Village	Corozal	470	385	+22.1%
Cristo Rey	Village	Corozal	868	781	+11.1%
Estrella	Village	Corozal	37	31	+19.4%
Libertad	Village	Corozal	1,607	1,496	+7.4%
Little Belize	Village	Corozal	2,650	2,207	+20.1%
Louisville	Village	Corozal	880	681	+29.2%
Paraiso	Village	Corozal	1,008	878	+14.8%
Patchakan	Village	Corozal	1,374	1,202	+14.3%
Progresso	Village	Corozal	1,356	1,211	+12.0%
Ranchito	Village	Corozal	1,340	1,100	+21.8%
San Andrés	Village	Corozal	1,049	779	+34.7%
San Antonio	Village	Corozal	569	264	+115.5%
San Joaquín	Village	Corozal	1,470	1,251	+17.5%
San Narciso	Village	Corozal	2,423	2,183	+11.0%
San Pedro	Village	Corozal	520	455	+14.3%
San Román	Village	Corozal	883	691	+27.8%
San Víctor	Village	Corozal	962	676	+42.3%
Santa Clara	Village	Corozal	862	790	+9.1%
Sarteneja	Village	Corozal	1,824	1,674	+9.0%
Xaibe	Village	Corozal	1,575	1,316	+19.7%
Yo Chen	Village	Corozal	80	63	+27.0%
Orange Walk Town	Town	Orange Walk	13,700	13,741	−0.3%
August Pine Ridge	Village	Orange Walk	1,794	1,701	+5.5%
Blue Creek	Village	Orange Walk	407	767	−46.9%
Carmelita	Village	Orange Walk	1,475	834	+76.9%
Chan Chich	Village	Orange Walk	52	44	+18.2%
Chan Pine Ridge	Village	Orange Walk	445	372	+19.6%
Cuatro Leguas	Village	Orange Walk	154	0	NA
Douglas	Village	Orange Walk	521	564	−7.6%
Fire Burn	Village	Orange Walk	103	112	−8.0%
Guinea Grass	Village	Orange Walk	3,218	2,651	+21.4%
Honey Camp	Village	Orange Walk	37	0	NA
Indian Church	Village	Orange Walk	267	221	+20.8%
Indian Creek	Village	Orange Walk	904	747	+21.0%
Indian Hill Estate	Village	Orange Walk	43	0	NA
Petville	Village	Orange Walk	67	0	NA
Richmond Hill	Village	Orange Walk	38	41	−7.3%
San Antonio	Village	Orange Walk	402	397	+1.3%
San Carlos	Village	Orange Walk	138	180	−23.3%
San Estevan	Village	Orange Walk	1,661	1,566	+6.1%
San Felipe	Village	Orange Walk	1,501	1,099	+36.6%
San José	Village	Orange Walk	2,861	2,381	+20.2%
San José Palmar	Village	Orange Walk	1,355	914	+48.2%
San Juan	Village	Orange Walk	320	254	+26.0%
San Lorenzo	Village	Orange Walk	404	0	NA
San Lázaro	Village	Orange Walk	1,050	959	+9.5%
San Luis	Village	Orange Walk	258	236	+9.3%
San Pablo	Village	Orange Walk	1,129	974	+15.9%
San Román	Village	Orange Walk	437	486	−10.1%
Santa Cruz	Village	Orange Walk	260	264	−1.5%
Santa Marta	Village	Orange Walk	600	438	+37.0%
Shipyard	Village	Orange Walk	3,345	2,334	+43.3%
Sylvestre Camp	Village	Orange Walk	88	218	−59.6%
Tower Hill	Village	Orange Walk	314	273	+15.0%
Tres Leguas	Village	Orange Walk	158	0	NA
Trial Farm	Village	Orange Walk	4,264	3,344	+27.5%
Trinidad	Village	Orange Walk	570	577	−1.2%
Yo Creek	Village	Orange Walk	1,413	1,386	+1.9%
Dangriga	Town	Stann Creek	9,583	8,767	+9.3%
Alta Vista	Village	Stann Creek	369	646	−42.9%
Cow Pen	Village	Stann Creek	1,042	415	+151.1%
George Town	Village	Stann Creek	473	794	−40.4%
Hope Creek	Village	Stann Creek	1,128	604	+86.8%
Hopkins	Village	Stann Creek	1,610	1,034	+55.7%
Hummingbird Community	Village	Stann Creek	466	336	+38.7%
Independence	Village	Stann Creek	4,014	2,995	+34.0%
Kendal	Village	Stann Creek	118	99	+19.2%
Mango Creek	Village	Stann Creek	80	0	NA
Maya Beach	Village	Stann Creek	229	0	NA
Maya Center	Village	Stann Creek	386	305	+26.6%
Maya Mopan	Village	Stann Creek	632	444	+42.3%
Middlesex	Village	Stann Creek	222	314	−29.3%
Mullins River	Village	Stann Creek	235	206	+14.1%
Placencia	Village	Stann Creek	1,752	477	+267.3%
Pomona	Village	Stann Creek	1,730	1,146	+51.0%
Red Bank	Village	Stann Creek	1,201	684	+75.6%
Riversdale	Village	Stann Creek	567	713	−20.5%
San Juan	Village	Stann Creek	438	432	+1.4%
San Román	Village	Stann Creek	894	365	+144.9%
Santa Cruz	Village	Stann Creek	774	56	+1,282.1%
Santa Rosa	Village	Stann Creek	542	193	+180.8%
Sarawee	Village	Stann Creek	525	211	+148.8%
Seine Bight	Village	Stann Creek	1,310	865	+51.4%
Silk Grass	Village	Stann Creek	1,092	758	+44.1%
Sittee River	Village	Stann Creek	439	325	+35.1%
South Stann Creek	Village	Stann Creek	686	411	+66.9%
Steadfast	Village	Stann Creek	482	398	+21.1%
Valley Community	Village	Stann Creek	627	216	+190.3%
Punta Gorda	Town	Toledo	5,351	4,455	+20.1%
Aguacate	Village	Toledo	369	595	−38.0%
Barranco	Village	Toledo	157	252	−37.7%
Bella Vista	Village	Toledo	3,508	741	+373.4%
Big Falls	Village	Toledo	845	956	−11.6%
Bladden	Village	Toledo	466	408	+14.2%
Blue Creek	Village	Toledo	365	241	+51.5%
Boom Creek	Village	Toledo	96	104	−7.7%
Cattle Landing	Village	Toledo	226	209	+8.1%
Conejo	Village	Toledo	209	137	+52.6%
Corazon	Village	Toledo	188	140	+34.3%
Crique Jute	Village	Toledo	223	226	−1.3%
Crique Largo	Village	Toledo	46	111	−58.6%
Crique Sarco	Village	Toledo	328	255	+28.6%
Crique Trosa	Village	Toledo	84	40	+110.0%
Dolores	Village	Toledo	460	316	+45.6%
Dump	Village	Toledo	198	292	−32.2%
Elridge	Village	Toledo	513	388	+32.2%
Forest Home	Village	Toledo	479	503	−4.8%
Golden Stream	Village	Toledo	349	331	+5.4%
Graham Creek	Village	Toledo	110	54	+103.7%
Hicattee	Village	Toledo	95	139	−31.7%
Hicattee Southern Highway	Village	Toledo	363	0	NA
Indian Creek	Village	Toledo	722	592	+22.0%
Jacintoville	Village	Toledo	337	216	+56.0%
Jalacte	Village	Toledo	769	716	+7.4%
Jordan	Village	Toledo	146	36	+305.6%
Laguna	Village	Toledo	257	324	−20.7%
Mabilha	Village	Toledo	205	193	+6.2%
Mafredi	Village	Toledo	149	168	−11.3%
Mango Walk	Village	Toledo	244	353	−30.9%
Medina Bank	Village	Toledo	237	97	+144.3%
Midway	Village	Toledo	240	112	+114.3%
Monkey River	Village	Toledo	196	184	+6.5%
Moody Hill	Village	Toledo	44	0	NA
Na Luum Ca	Village	Toledo	66	72	−8.3%
New Road Area	Village	Toledo	357	241	+48.1%
Otoxha	Village	Toledo	263	261	+0.8%
Pinehill	Village	Toledo	206	97	+112.4%
Pueblo Viejo	Village	Toledo	432	571	−24.3%
Punta Negra	Village	Toledo	43	28	+53.6%
San Antonio	Village	Toledo	1,204	1,209	−0.4%
San Benito Poite	Village	Toledo	542	373	+45.3%
San Felipe	Village	Toledo	353	313	+12.8%
San Jose	Village	Toledo	849	816	+4.0%
San Isidro	Village	Toledo	374	0	NA
San Lucas	Village	Toledo	121	126	−4.0%
San Marcos	Village	Toledo	622	557	+11.7%
San Miguel	Village	Toledo	537	458	+17.2%
San Pablo	Village	Toledo	250	208	+20.2%
San Pedro Columbia	Village	Toledo	1,703	1,524	+11.7%
San Vicente	Village	Toledo	441	405	+8.9%
Santa Ana	Village	Toledo	290	245	+18.4%
Santa Cruz	Village	Toledo	387	337	+14.8%
Santa Elena	Village	Toledo	200	158	+26.6%
Santa Teresa	Village	Toledo	369	368	+0.3%
Silver Creek	Village	Toledo	476	345	+38.0%
Sunday Wood	Village	Toledo	285	218	+30.7%
Swasey	Village	Toledo	257	302	−14.9%
Tambran	Village	Toledo	63	65	−3.1%
Trio	Village	Toledo	899	400	+124.8%
Wilson Road	Village	Toledo	56	32	+75.0%
Yemeri Grove	Village	Toledo	265	108	+145.4%
