= Hicattee =

Hicatee
- Village
- Location in Belize
- Coordinates: 16.28304°N 88.877°W
- Country: Belize
- District: Toledo District
- Constituency: Toledo West

Population (2010)
  - Total: 363

Hicatee is a village in the Toledo District of Belize. In 2010, the village had a population of 363, mostly members of the Qʼeqchiʼ and Mopan peoples. The name of the village refers to a species of turtle called Hickatee (Dermatemys mawii).

== Geography ==
The village is located on the Southern Highway, at the western turnoff to Silver Creek. The nearest villages are Big Falls to the south and Silver Creek to the north.

=== Climate ===
According to the Köppen climate classification, Hicatee has a tropical rainforest climate (displayed as Af on climate maps).
