= Bella Vista, Belize =

Bella Vista
- Village
- Location in Belize
- Coordinates: 16.50161°N 88.52951°W
- Country: Belize
- District: Toledo District
- Constituency: Toledo East

Population (2022)
  - Total: 6,259

Bella Vista is the largest village in the Toledo District of Belize. According to the 2022 Belizean census, Bella Vista had a population of 6,259 people. It is located fifty-five miles north of Punta Gorda the district's capital.

== Geography and location ==
Bella Vista is located ten miles south-west of Independence and Mango Creek and fifty-five miles north of Punta Gorda, the district's capital.

== Demographics ==
At the time of the 2022 Belizean census, Bella Vista had a population of 6,259, which marked a 4.94% annual population change since the 2010 census which counted 3,508 villagers. Based on the 2010 census, the population was composed of 72.3% Mestizos, 20.3% Qʼeqchiʼ Maya, 3.1% Mopan Maya, 1.6% Mixed people, 1.1% Creole, 0.7% East Indian, 0.5% Asian, 0.3% Garifuna, and 0.1% others.

== Government and infrastructure ==
To support Bella Vista's expanding population and following a rise in violent crime, as of January 2026, the government planned to design and build a new police station, add technology such as surveillance cameras, and increase street lights. The Minister of Economic Development, Osmond Martinez, proposed that this rise in crime may be due to external influences, especially from other Central American countries.

== Public services ==
In June 2023, the Government of Belize launched a Digital Connect Center in Bella Vista. Located within the Humana People to People Belize Migrant Hub, the center was established through a partnership between Belize Trade and Investment Development Service and the United Nations Development Programme as part of a $360,000 national project. The facility provides free access to computers, high-learning opportunities, and digital literacy training, specifically targeting youth, women, the unemployed, and the elderly.

== Sports ==
In April 2024, the Government of Belize announced plans to construct a state-of-the-art football stadium in Bella Vista to serve the population of Toledo West. The project was supported by the Ministry of Sports and the Ministry of Economic Development and is planned to impact the community.
