= Dump, Belize =

City in Belize

Coordinates: 16.228°N 88.939°W

Dump is a village in Toledo District, Belize. The village is located on the Southern Highway approximately 20 km from Punta Gorda. It lies at an elevation of 34 meters above sea level. Two secondary schools are located in Dump: the Centre for Employment Training, and Julian Cho Technical High School.
