= Ontario, Belize =

Ontario is a village in the Cayo District of central interior Belize. The village is in an agricultural region with the most frequent crops being citrus and banana. It is one of 192 municipalities administered at the village level in the country for census taking purposes.

== Demographics ==
The village had a population of 775 in 2010. This represents roughly 1.2 % of the district's total population. This was a 25% increase from 621 people recorded in the 2000 census. In terms of ethnicity, 47.1% were Mestizo, 40.8% Creole, 5.8% Mixed, 3.2% East Indian, 0.9% Caucasian, 0.4% Mopan Maya, 0.4% Mennonite, 0.3% Garifuna, 0.3% Lebanese, 0.1% Asian, 0.1% Ketchi Maya and 0.4% others.
