= Seven Miles, Belize =

Seven Miles, occasionally referred to as Seven Miles El Progresso, is a village in the Cayo District of central interior Belize. The village is in an agricultural region with the most frequent crops being citrus and banana. It is one of 192 municipalities administered at the village level in the country for census-taking purposes.

The village is on karst plateau containing many caves. Barton Creek Cave underlies the village and its entrance is at the base of the cliffs.

== Demographics ==
At the time of the 2010 census, Seven Miles had a population of 482. This represents roughly 0.7 % of the district's total population. No census record was taken for the village in 2000. In terms of ethnicity, 94.4% were Mestizo, 1.9% Mennonite, 1.0% Yucatec Maya, 0.8% Caucasian, 0.8% Creole, 0.4% Mixed, 0.2% Ketchi Maya, 0.2% Mopan Maya and 0.2% others.
