= Cotton Tree, Belize =

Village in Belize

Coordinates: 17°16′33″N 88°42′48″W

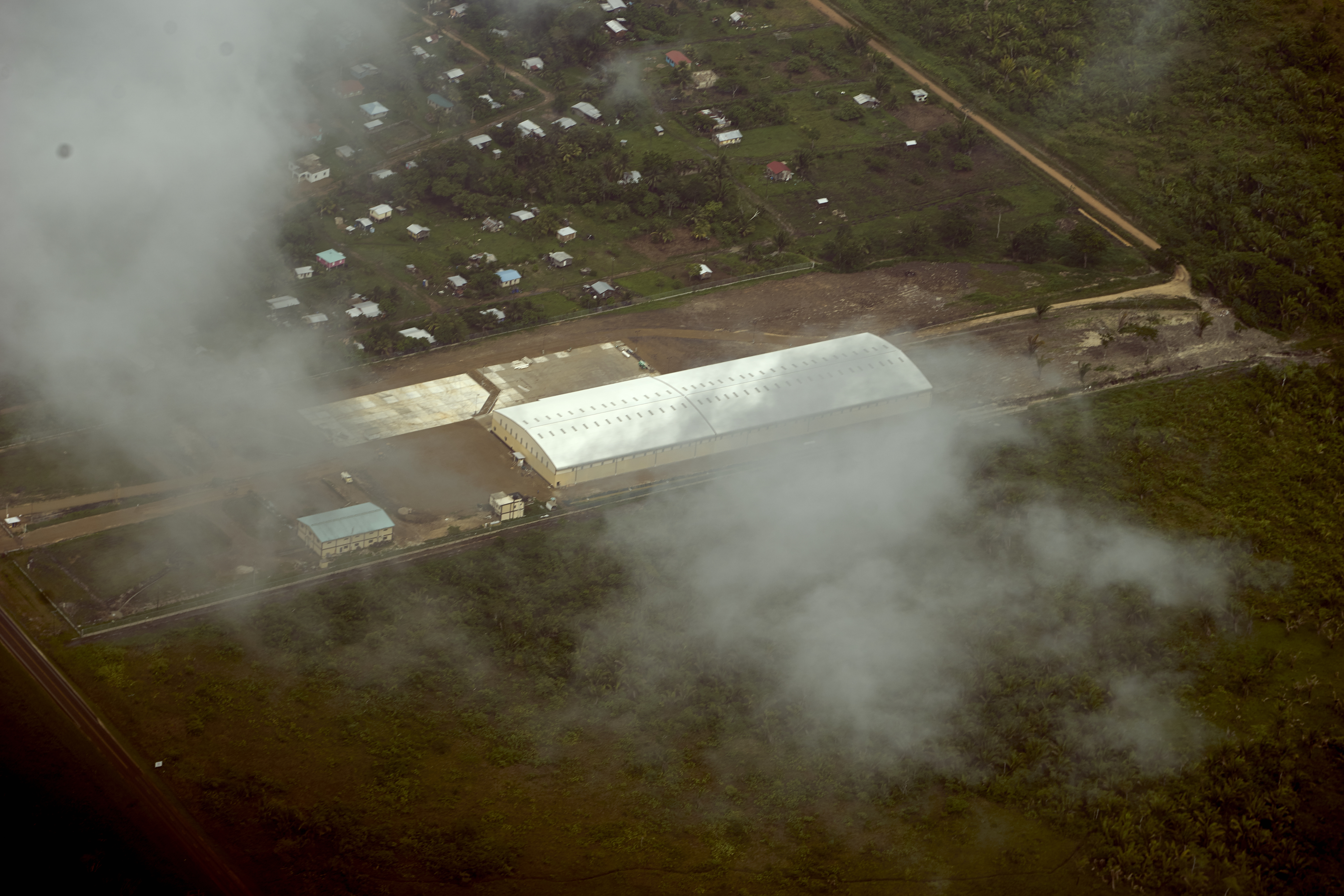
Aerial view over the BestManufacturing Building on the west side of Cotton Tree Village in 2015

Cotton Tree is a village in the Cayo District of central interior Belize. The village is situated 5km to the northeast of Belmopan along the Western Highway. The surrounding area is agricultural with the most frequent crops being citrus and banana. It is one of 192 municipalities administered at the village level in the country for census taking purposes.

== Demographics ==
The village had a population of 1,573 at the time of the 2010 census. This represents roughly 2.4% of the district's total population. This was an 81.8% increase from 865 people recorded in the 2000 census. In terms of ethnicity, 65.5% were Mestizo, 23.6% Creole, 3.4% Mopan Maya, 3.1% Mixed, 2.0% Ketchi Maya, 0.8% East Indian, 0.4% Asian, 0.4% Mennonite, 0.3% Garifuna, 0.1% African, 0.1% Caucasian, 0.1% Yucatec Maya and 0.4% others.
