= Billy White, Belize =

Village in Cayo District, Belize

Coordinates: 17°12′42″N 89°03′00″W

Billy White is a village in the Cayo District of central interior Belize, located on the north shore of the Belize River. The village is in an agricultural region with the most frequent crops being citrus and banana. It is one of 192 municipalities administered at the village level in the country for census taking purposes.

== Demographics ==
At the time of the 2010 census, Billy White had a population of 586. This represents roughly 0.9 % of the district's total population. This was a 127.1% increase from 258 people recorded in the 2000 census. In terms of ethnicity, 97.4% were Mestizo, 0.9% Caucasian, 0.5% Mennonite, 0.3% Mopan Maya, 0.2% Hindu, 0.2% Ketchi Maya, 0.2% Yucatec Maya and 0.2% others.
