= Big Falls, Belize =

Village in Toledo District, Belize

Big Falls is a populated settlement located in the nation of Belize. It is a mainland village that is located in Toledo District.

== Demographics ==
At the time of the 2010 census, Big Falls had a population of 845. Of these, 58.5% were Ketchi Maya, 14.3% Mestizo, 10.5% Mopan Maya, 6.2% Mixed, 4.5% Creole, 3.2% East Indian, 1.7% Caucasian, 0.4% Garifuna, 0.2% African, 0.1% Yucatec Maya and 0.5% others.
