= Riversdale, Belize =

Village in Stann Creek District, Belize

Riversdale
- Village
- Location within Belize
- Coordinates: 16.6152°N 88.3542°W
- Country: Belize
- District: Stann Creek District

Population (2010)
  - Total: 229
- Time zone: Central

Riversdale is a village in the Stann Creek District of Belize located on the northern end of the Placencia Peninsula. Based on the 2010 national census, the Riversdale area has a population of 567 year round residents although the number living in village itself is closer to 100. The village is home to a single resort, Lost Reef Resort.

== Demographics ==
At the time of the 2010 census, Riversdale had a population of 229. Of these, 39.3% were Caucasian, 35.8% Mestizo, 8.7% Mopan Maya, 7.9% Mixed, 1.7% Asian, 1.7% Ketchi Maya, 1.3% African, 1.3% Creole, 0.4% East Indian, 0.4% Yucatec Maya, 0.4% Mennonite and 0.4% others.

== See also ==
- Geography of Belize
- History of Belize
- List of municipalities in Belize
