= Silver Creek, Belize =

Silver Creek
- Location within Belize
- Coordinates: 16°16′N 88°53′W
- Country: Belize
- District: Toledo District

Population (2000)
  - Total: 1,326
- Time zone: UTC-6 (Central)
- Climate: Af

Silver Creek is a village in the Toledo District of Belize. According to the 2000 census, Silver Creek had a population of 1,326 people. There is also a stream named Silver Creek at this same location. Near the village of Silver Creek is an ancient Maya civilization site. Nearby there is a larger Maya site from at least as early as 700 AD, Lubaantun.

== Demographics ==
At the time of the 2010 census, Silver Creek had a population of 476. Of these, 96.0% were Ketchi Maya, 1.9% Mopan Maya, 1.5% Mixed and 0.4% Mestizo.
