= Franks Eddy =

Village in Cayo District, Belize

Franks Eddy (occasionally spelled "Frank's Eddy") is a village in the Cayo District of central interior Belize. The village is in an agricultural region with the most frequent crops being citrus and banana. It is one of 192 municipalities administered at the village level in the country for census taking purposes.

== Demographics ==
At the time of the 2010 census, Franks Eddy had a population of 378. This represents roughly 0.6% of the district's total population. This was a 78% increase from 212 people recorded in the 2000 census. In terms of ethnicity, 96.0% were Mestizo, 1.9% Mopan Maya, 1.1% Ketchi Maya, 0.8% Creole, 0.3% Mennonite and 0.3% Mixed.
