= Cristo Rey, Cayo =

Village in Cayo District, Belize

Coordinates: 17°07′41″N 89°03′18″W

Cristo Rey is a village in the Cayo District of central interior Belize, situated on the east bank of the Macal River. The village is in an agricultural region with the most frequent crops being citrus and banana. It is one of 192 municipalities administered at the village level in the country for census taking purposes.

== Demographics ==
The village had a population of 874 at the time of the 2010 census. This represents roughly 1.3% of the district's total population. This was a 19% increase from 735 people recorded in the 2000 census. In terms of ethnicity, 74.9% were Mestizo, 12.4% Yucatec Maya, 6.3% Creole, 3.4% Caucasian, 0.9% Ketchi Maya, 0.5% East Indian, 0.3% Mopan Maya, 0.2% Asian, 0.1% Mixed and 0.8% others.
