= St. Matthew's =

St. Matthew's may refer to:

== Schools, colleges or universities ==
- St Matthews University in the Cayman Islands
- St. Matthew High School (Ottawa), Ontario, Canada
- St Matthew's Primary School in Cambridge, England
- St. Matthew's Primary School, Ballyward, County Down
- St. Matthew's Primary School, Fawkner, Victoria
- St. Matthew's Primary School, Bishopbriggs, Glasgow
- St Matthew's Catholic Primary School, Logan City, Queensland, Australia

== Places ==
=== Belize ===
- St. Matthews, Belize, a village in Cayo District, Belize

=== United Kingdom ===
- St Matthew's, Leicester, Leicestershire
- St Matthew's, Preston, Lancashire
- St. Matthew's, Walsall, West Midlands

=== United States ===
- St. Matthews, Kentucky
- St. Matthews, South Carolina
- St. Matthew's Episcopal Church (Queens)

== Sports ==
- St Matthews F.C., an association football club in Northern Ireland, United Kingdom
- St. Matthew's (soccer team), an association football club in Missouri, United States
