= San Pablo Village, Belize =

San Pablo
- Village
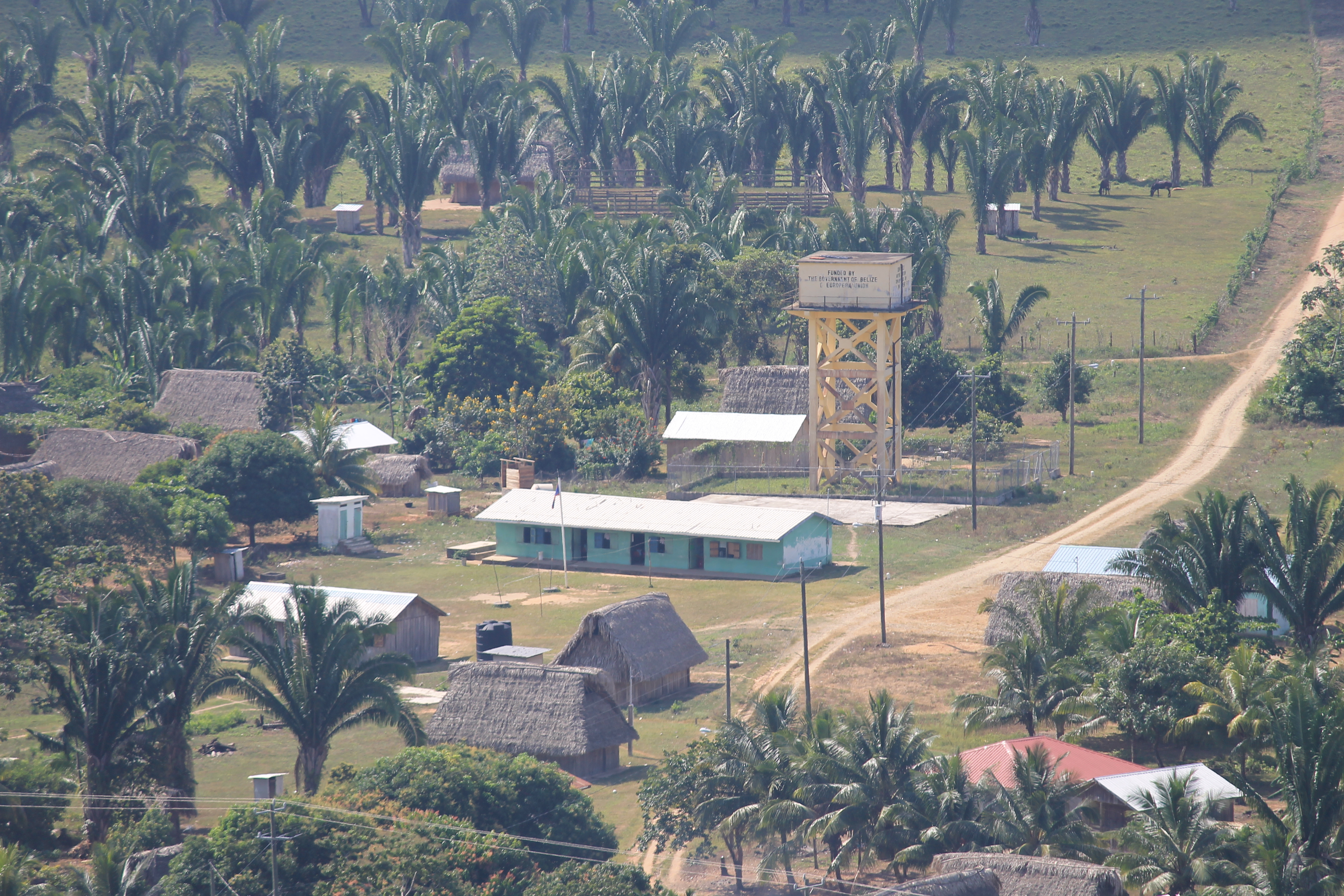
- A view of San Pablo village from the mountains near Red Bank village.

- Location within Belize
- Coordinates: 16°36′42.5″N 88°34′48.5″W
- Country: Belize
- District: Toledo Creek

Population (2014)
  - Total: 280 (est)
- Time zone: UTC-6 (Central No DST)
- Climate: Am

San Pablo is a small village located in the Toledo District of Belize.

== Geography ==
The landscape surrounding the village includes jungle and banana farms.

== Demographics ==
According to 2000 census, the village is home to 300 permanent residents. 2014 population estimate of San Pablo Village is 280. Many of the residents are Q'eqchi' and speak the Q'eqchi' language, Spanish, and some English.
