= Aguacate =

Aguacate is the Spanish word for avocado.

Aguacate may also refer to:

- Aguacate, Belize, a village in Toledo District, Belize
- Aguacate, Cuba, a former town near Havana, Cuba
- Aguacate, Aguadilla, Puerto Rico, a barrio in the municipality of Aguadilla, Puerto Rico
- Aguacate, Yabucoa, Puerto Rico, a barrio in the municipality of Yabucoa, Puerto Rico
