= Patchakan =

Patchakán
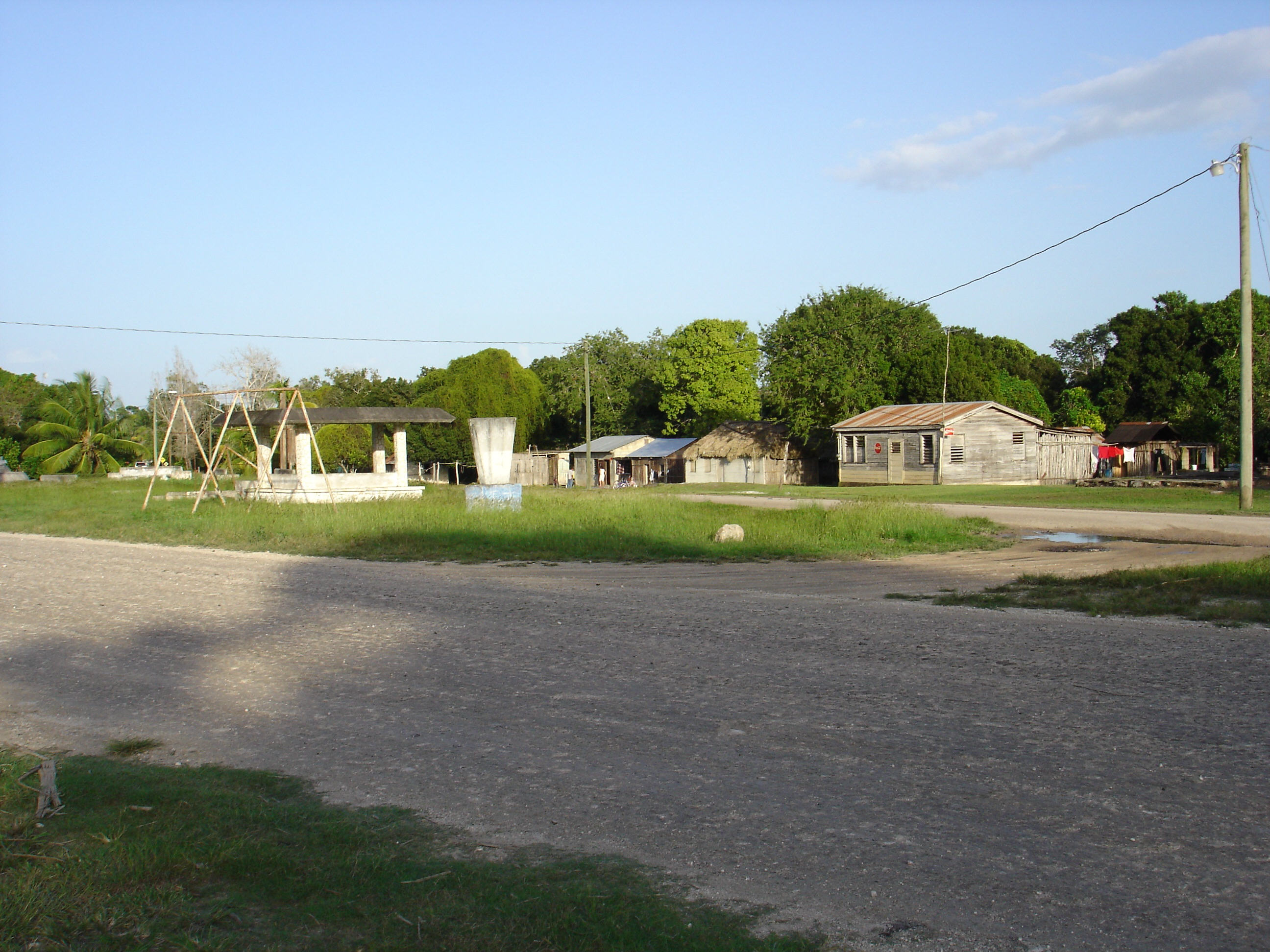
- A public park on the south end of town

- Location within Belize
- Coordinates: 18°24′02″N 88°28′21″W
- Country: Belize
- District: Corozal District
- Constituency: Corozal North

Population (2010)
  - Total: 1,374
- Time zone: UTC-6 (Central)

Patchakán is a town in Corozal District, in northern Belize. The name Patchacan means "behind the shavanna" in Yucatec Maya.

== Demographics ==
At the time of the 2010 census, Patchakán had a population of 1,374. Of these, 93.2% were Mestizo, 3.9% Mixed, 1.2% Yucatec Maya, 0.7% Caucasian, 0.7% Creole, 0.2% Ketchi Maya, 0.1% African and 0.1% Mennonite.

In terms of languages spoken (multiple answers allowed), 98.9% spoke Spanish, 52.8% English, 7.9% Yucatec Maya, 1.5% Creole, 0.1% German and 0.1% Ketchi Maya; 0.1% could not speak.
