= Chan Pine Ridge =

- Location within Belize
- Coordinates: 18°2′13″N 88°34′57″W
- Country: Belize
- District: Orange Walk District
- Constituency: Orange Walk East

Government
  - Area Representative: Hon. Kevin Bernard
  - Village Council Chairman: Nayim Reyes
- Time zone: UTC-6 (Central)

Chan Pine Ridge is a village in the Orange Walk District of the nation of Belize. It is a predominantly Maya Mestizo village with Spanish being the preferred language of communication. English is taught at the Chan Pine Ridge Government School which is the only Primary School serving the community. Kriol is also spoken among the villagers. The Name Chan Pine Ridge is a combination of the Yucatec Maya word Chan meaning "small" in English and Pine Ridge which is English.

== Demographics ==
At the time of the 2010 census, Chan Pine Ridge had a population of 445. Of these, 94.8% were Mestizo, 3.1% Mixed, 0.9% Mopan Maya, 0.4% Creole, 0.2% Caucasian, 0.2% East Indian and 0.2% Yucatec Maya.
