= Arenal, Belize =

Village in Cayo District, Belize

Coordinates: 17°01′23″N 89°09′03″W

Arenal is a village in the Cayo District of central interior Belize. It is part of the Cayo West constituency. The village is in an agricultural region with the most frequent crops being citrus and banana. It is one of 192 municipalities administered at the village level in the country for census-taking purposes. The village had a population of 613 in 2010. This represents roughly 0.9% of the district's total population. This was a 29.1% increase from 475 people recorded in the 2000 census.

== Demographics ==
At the time of the 2010 census, Arenal had a population of 613. Of these, 95.1% were Mestizo, 2.5% Ketchi Maya, 1.1% Mennonite, 0.5% Creole, 0.3% Caucasian, 0.2% Yucatec Maya and 0.2% Mixed.

In terms of languages spoken (multiple answers allowed), 99.6% spoke Spanish, 18.9% English, 2.2% Ketchi Maya, 0.4% German and 0.2% Yucatec Maya; 0.2% could not speak.
