= Aguacate, Belize =

Village in Belize

Coordinates: 16°09′42″N 89°05′30″W

Aguacate is a village in Toledo District, Belize. Most of the inhabitants of the village speak Q’eqchi’, a Mayan language.

== Demographics ==
At the time of the 2010 census, Aguacate had a population of 369. Of these, 93.0% were Ketchi Maya, 3.8% Mopan Maya and 3.3% Mixed.
