= San Pedro Columbia =

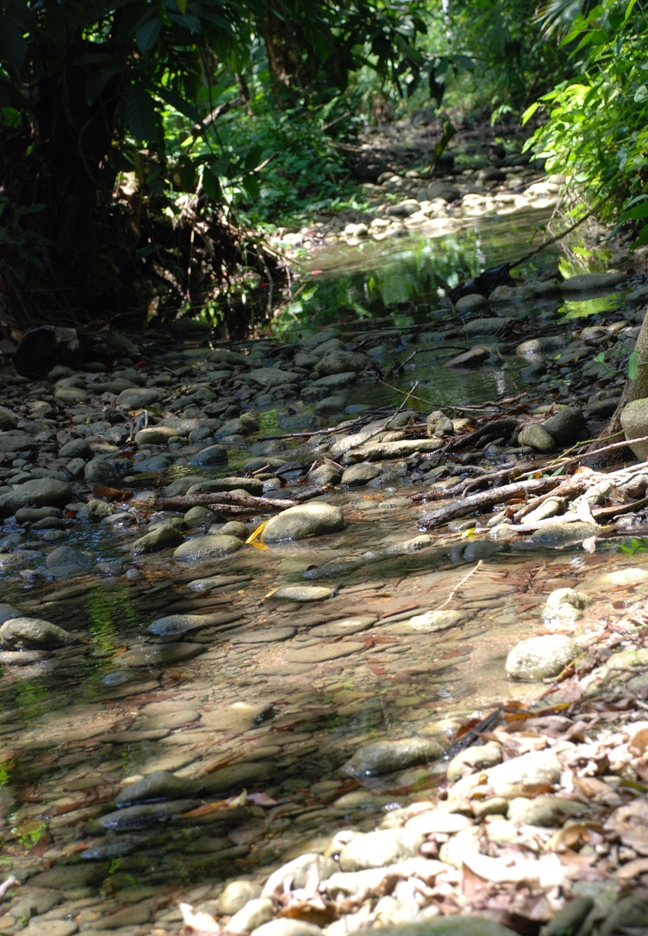

- Location within Belize
- Coordinates: 16°6′N 88°57′W
- Country: Belize
- District: Toledo District
- Constituency: Toledo West

Population (2000)
  - Total: 700
- Time zone: UTC-6 (Central)
- Climate: Af

San Pedro Columbia is a village in Toledo District, Belize, located about two miles from the ancient Maya ruins of Lubaantun. In 2000 San Pedro Columbia had a population of about 700 people. The population is mostly Q'eqchi Maya with some Mopan Maya. San Pedro Columbia has Belize's largest settlement of Kekchi. Most of the population came to Belize from the Petén region of Guatemala in the late 19th century. The village is known for the hand woven embroidery produced there.

== Ancient history ==
Lubaantun is one of the area's pre-Columbian Maya sites, inhabited at least as early as the Maya Classic Period. Lubaantun has unusual features of construction including drystone work and rounded corners that set it apart from other Maya sites.
