= Unitedville =

Village in Cayo District, Belize

Coordinates: 17°12′46″N 88°56′12″W

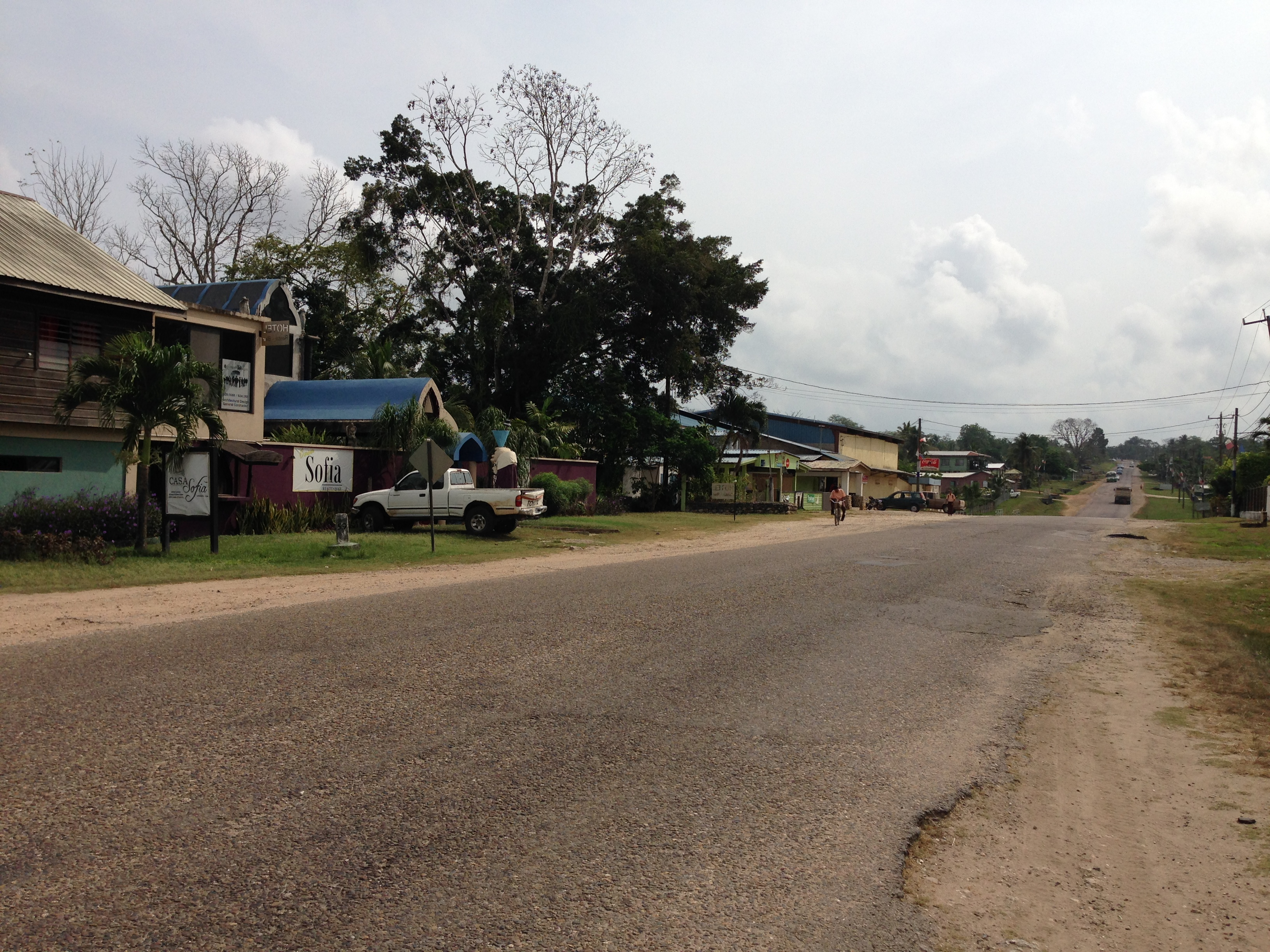
Image of a main street in Unitedville in 2016

Unitedville is a village in the Cayo District of central interior Belize. The village is in an agricultural region with the most frequent crops being citrus and banana. It is one of 192 municipalities administered at the village level in the country for census taking purposes.

== Demographics ==
At the time of the 2010 census, Unitedville had a population of 971 in 2010. This represents roughly 1.5 % of the district's total population. This was a 64% increase from 593 people recorded in the 2000 census. In terms of ethnicity, 53.3% were Creole, 32.1% Mestizo, 4.8% Caucasian, 4.6% Mixed, 1.5% East Indian, 1.0% African, 0.8% Garifuna, 0.4% Asian and 0.4% Ketchi Maya and 0.8% others.
