= Gracie Rock =

Gracie Rock is a populated settlement located in the nation of Belize. It is a mainland village that is located in Belize District.

== Demographics ==
At the time of the 2010 census, Gracie Rock had a population of 255. Of these, 83.9% were Creole, 8.6% Mestizo, 6.7% Mixed, 0.4% Caucasian and 0.4% East Indian.
