= Thomas Vincent Ramos Highway =

Belizean highway

- Southern Highway
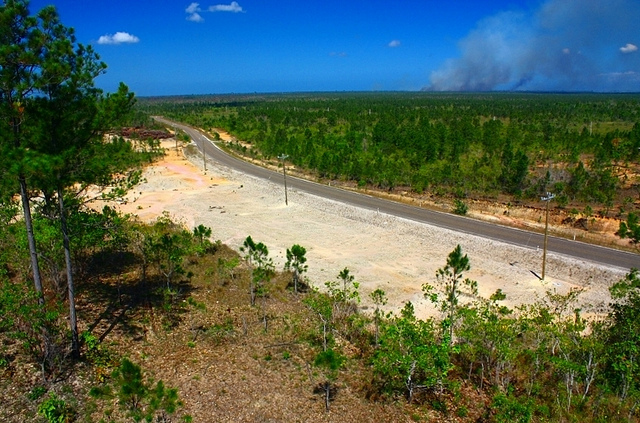
- Southern Highway just south of Deep River

Route information
- Length: 97.97 mi (157.67 km)

Major junctions
- From: Dangriga
- Dangriga Junction, Placencia Roundabout, Independence Junction, The Dump
- To: Punta Gorda

Location
- Country: Belize
- Districts: Stann Creek, Toledo

Highway system
- Roads in Belize

In Belize, the Thomas Vincent Ramos Highway takes up where the Hummingbird Highway ends and runs from Dangriga to Punta Gorda. It is entirely paved, with the completion of a 10-mile segment between Golden Stream and Big Falls circa 2008–09. The T.V. Ramos Highway provides important access to a number of Mayan ruins and natural areas. The ancient Mayan sites of Nim Li Punit and Lubaantun are each situated a few miles west of the highway in southern Belize. The Cockscomb Basin Wildlife Sanctuary is several miles west of the highway in south-central Belize.

In 2011, a project was initiated, and complete by 2015, to extend the Southern Highway 21.4 mi/34.5 km to Jalacte in southwestern Belize.

On September 30, 2020 the Southern Highway was renamed to Thomas Vincent Ramos Highway. It was named after Thomas Vincent Ramos, the creator of Garifuna Settlement Day.

== Junction list ==
Location	Mile	km	Destination	Notes
Stann Creek	0.0	0.0	Hummingbird Highway	Elevation, 21 m
Stann Creek	10.0	16.1	Road into Commerce Bight	Elevation, 23 m
Stann Creek	12.3	19.8	Road into Hopkins	Elevation, 19 m
Stann Creek	19.3	31.1	Placencia Road –Placencia, Riversdale, Seine Bight	Elevation, 30 metres
Stann Creek	43.8	70.5	Turnoff to Monkey River Town	Elevation, 20 m
Toledo	77.4	124.6	Turnoff to Silver Creek, San Miguel, San Pedro Columbia	Elevation, 29 m
Toledo	83.1	133.7	Junction: road southeast to Toledo District – Punta Gorda; northwest along Jalacte road to Jimmy Cut, Pueblo Viejo, Blue Creek, Aguacate, Otoxha and Dolores	Elevation, 24 metres
Toledo	86.1	138.6	Machaca Forest Station	Elevation, 34 m
Toledo	88.9	143.0	Road to Piebra, Barranco, Conejo, Crique Sarco	Elevation, 15 m
Toledo	92.1	148.3	West access road – Punta Gorda	Elevation, 24 m
Toledo	97.1	156.2	West access road	Terminus of highway; elevation, 7 metres
