= Cristina Coc =

Leader of the Maya community in southern Belize

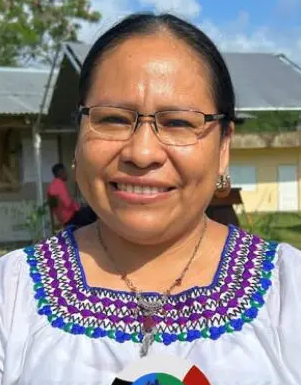
- Born: 21 December 1981 (age 44); Laguna, Toledo District, Belize
- Occupation: Director
- Years active: 1999-present
- Organization: Julian Cho Society
- Known for: Forest conservation and Maya land rights advocacy

Cristina Coc (born 1981) is a leader of the Maya community in southern Belize. She has served as co-spokesperson for the Maya Leadership Alliance and is the founder and executive director of the advocacy organization, the Julian Cho Society. In 2015, she and the MLA were awarded the Equator Prize for their efforts in protecting indigenous rights.

== Early life ==
Cristina Coc was born on 21 December 1981 in Laguna, a traditional Mayan village in the Toledo District of Belize. She was the youngest of four other daughters born to Maria (née Baki) and Mateo Coc. Until she entered school, Coc was raised in Laguna, but seeking a better education for their children, the family relocated to Punta Gorda, where Coc attended St. Peter Claver School. Her academic excellence led to a scholarship award to attend high school at the Toledo Community College, from which she graduated in 1998. Determined to continue her education, Coc applied to St. John's College, Junior College (SJCJC) and was accepted but had to leave school because of financial and personal hardship.

== Career ==
In 1999, Coc began working at the Toledo Christian Academy in the rural part of the Toledo District. After a year of employment, she had earned enough money to return to SJCJ and her schooling. She became involved in student government and became active in a dispute over bus fares. At the completion of her studies, Coc returned to Punta Gorda and began working as an English teacher at Julian Cho Technical High School (JCTHS). She actively worked for equal treatment and respect of Mayan students at JCTHS and participated in a liaison program with the Janus Foundation, which taught her mobilization and motivational skills. In 2003, Coc moved to Duluth, Minnesota to pursue a Bachelor of Science degree in biology at the University of Minnesota. Once again, during her studies, she worked in social justice and women's organizations.

Upon completion of her degree, Coc returned to the Toledo District in 2005 and founded the Julian Cho Society (JCS), an indigenous rights organization named for a former Maya activist. As Executive Director, Coc led the organization to drive sustainable development, as well as social and human rights protection programs. In 2006, Coc served as a spokesperson, organizer and provided testimony in a landmark case involving Maya land rights. The government of Belize had granted US Capital Energy—Belize Ltd. rights to conduct seismic testing for oil in the Sarstoon-Temash National Park. The Maya villages whose traditional lands extended into the park were not consulted, as they had not been when the park was created as a nature preserve in 1994. A co-management agreement had later been negotiated between the communities and the government, which the indigenous communities felt had been violated by the government authorizing oil prospecting. Coc helped organize the Maya to prepare a lawsuit and along with Greg Choc was appointed a spokesperson for the Maya Leaders Alliance (MLA). Presenting testimony on the customary land tenure of the Maya and the history and ethnography of the region, Coc and Choc urged that the traditional boundaries and land tenure of southern Belize be respected and that the government cease granting logging and mineral extraction contracts on Maya lands.

On 18 October 2007 the Toledo Maya won their case The government was ordered to protect the traditional boundaries and land tenure of southern Belize. The case also required that discussion of land management in the Mayan communities must involve the communities and that their human rights must be protected by the government. Since the initial ruling, the Maya led by Coc and the MLA have returned to court, in 2008 winning their case in the Supreme Court in 2010; in 2011, before the Appeals Court, and all the way to the Caribbean Court of Justice (CCJ) in 2013. Despite their repeated wins, Coc's case alleged that the government was continuing issuing permits for drilling oil on Maya lands. In 2015, the CCJ upheld the land rights of the Maya, ordering the Government of Belize to protect their rights and pay reparations.

Within a few months of the verdict, Coc was arrested, along with other members of the MLA, and accused of unlawfully detaining a non-Mayan, who was building a house on sacred land. The Maya had previously notified the Belize Defence Force, the Belize Institute of Archeology and the Punta Gorda Police, about the illegal construction, but no action was taken to stop Rupert Myles from building. When Myles bulldozed a part the Uxebnka Archaeological Project Maya leaders asked him to stop. Myles initially threatened use of a firearm and was detained. Prime Minister Dean Barrow alleged that the detention of Myles was racially motivated, allegations which were denied by Coc and the MLA. Coc was seen as the main instigator of the dispute, and she, along with a dozen other Maya leaders were arrested and charged with unlawful detention and common assault. The incident escalated to international levels with the United Nations Special Rapporteur on the Rights of Indigenous Peoples calling on the Government of Belize to "establish a dialogue with Maya leadership" and resolve the case, as well as land tenure issues of Belize's Maya people. In December 2015, the charges of unlawful imprisonment were dropped and in June 2016 the prosecution of the remainder of the charges were halted.

Coc continues in her fight to enforce the land tenure rights the Maya people won in their landmark judgement and has returned to the CCJ to enlist their help in monitoring the Government of Belize's compliance. She and the other members of the MLA were awarded in 2015 with the Equator Prize for their advocacy on indigenous rights.
