= Corozalito =

Settlement of Belize District, Belize

Coordinates: 9.849°N 85.377°W

Corozalito is a settlement located in the nation of Belize. It is a mainland village located in Belize District.

== Demographics ==
At the time of the 2010 census, Corozalito had a population of 84. Of these, 53.6% were Creole, 32.1% Mestizo, 7.1% East Indian, 4.8% Mixed, 1.2% Caucasian and 1.2% Yucatec Maya.
