= Branch Mouth =

Village in Cayo District, Belize

Coordinates: 17°10′50″N 89°04′52″W

Branch Mouth is a village in the Cayo District of central interior Belize. It is situated north of San Ignacio and named for its placement near the confluence of the Macal and Mopan Rivers where the Belize River is formed. The village is in an agricultural region with the most frequent crops being citrus and banana. It is one of 192 municipalities administered at the village level in the country for census-taking purposes.

== Demographics ==
At the time of the 2010 census, Branch Mouth had a population of 127. This represents roughly 0.2% of the district's total population. This was a 53.80% decrease from 275 people recorded in the 2000 census. In terms of ethnicity, 94.5% were Mestizo, 4.7% Yucatec Maya and 0.8% Mixed.
