= Mexicans in Belize =

Total population
- 6,000

Languages
- Spanish, Belizean English

Religion
- Roman Catholicism

Mexican immigration to Belize refers to the settlement of Mexicans in the Central American country. It is estimated that there are about 5,000 Mexicans among their descendants and immigrants, the majority coming from the bordering states such as Quintana Roo and Campeche; as well as from Yucatán (which ceased to border Belize at the beginning of the 20th century with the creation of the territory of Quintana Roo) and from the northern states of the country with a Mennonite presence.

== See also ==
- Belize–Mexico relations
- Hispanic and Latin American Belizean
