= Cristo Rey, Corozal =

Village in Corozal, Belize

Cristo Rey is a village in the Corozal District of Belize.

== Demographics ==
At the time of the 2010 census, Cristo Rey had a population of 868. Of these, 86.3% were Mestizo, 6.3% Mixed, 5.8% Yucatec Maya, 0.7% Mennonite, 0.6% Creole, 0.1% East Indian and 0.1% Garifuna.

In terms of languages spoken (multiple answers allowed), 98.2% spoke Spanish, 39.5% English, 14.0% Yucatec Maya and 1.9% Creole; 0.4% could not speak.
