= Calla Creek =

Village in Cayo District, Belize

- Village
- Interactive map of Calla Creek
- Coordinates: 17°07′19″N 89°08′01″W
- Country: Belize
- District: Cayo

Calla Creek is a village in the Cayo District of central interior Belize. It is situated along the Mopan River near the border with Guatemala. The village is in an agricultural region with the most frequent crops being citrus and banana. It is one of 192 municipalities administered at the village level in the country for census taking purposes.

== Demographics ==
The village had a population of 286 at the time of the 2010 census. This represents roughly 0.4% of the district's total population. This was a 15.3% increase from 248 people recorded in the 2000 census. In terms of ethnicity, 96.9% were Mestizo, 2.4% Caucasian, 0.3% Creole and 0.3% Mennonite.
