= Bomba, Belize =

Coordinates: 17°53′N 88°16′W

Bomba is a settlement located in the nation of Belize. It is a mainland village located in Belize District. On November 1, 2016, it was announced that the residents now have electricity.

== Demographics ==
At the time of the 2010 Census, Bomba had a population of 71. Of these, 53.5% were Mestizo, 28.2% Creole, 15.5% Mixed and 2.8% Garifuna.
