= Honey Camp Lagoon =

Honey Camp Lagoon is a freshwater lagoon in Belize. The lagoon is located in the district of Orange Walk and is approximately 9 miles away from the nearest town Orange Walk Town. The surrounding area of the lagoon is mostly undeveloped properties which are privately owned. The water in the lagoon is clear and has a maximum depth of thirty feet, with a bottom being lined with decomposed limestone.

== History ==
The lagoon was once inhabited by the Maya civilization in the Postclassic Era (A.D. 900 to 1500 ). Archaeologists over the years have had many discoveries throughout the lagoon which have revealed evidence of the Maya civilization. On the largest island found in the lagoon, a shrine was discovered that demonstrates the recreation and survival of ancient Maya customs of ancestor worship and rain-god ceremonies. Archaeologists refer to Honey Camp Lagoon as "Laguna de On". The lagoon is currently popular among locals and tourists.

== Research studies ==
Studies began in 1926 with Thomas Gann who discovered effigy ceramics from "pavement" located on the large island surface. The lagoon was also visited by Clement Meighan and James Bennyhoff in the 1950s where they discovered lithic artifacts. In 1980 Thomas Kelly and John Masson also visited the site. Dr. Marilyn Masson also visited the site in 1996 and made discoveries of her own.
