= Paslow Falls/Plant =

Village in Belize

Paslow Falls/Plant is a census designated village on the Mopan River in the Cayo District of central interior Belize. In reality this village includes properties on Paslow Falls Road and around the Water Treatment Plant serving the greater Bullet Tree Falls community which this area lies on the northwest corner of. The village is in an agricultural region with the most frequent crops being citrus and banana. It is one of 192 municipalities administered at the village level in the country for census taking purposes. The village had a population of 194 in 2010. This represents roughly 0.3 % of the district's total population. No census record was taken for the village in 2000.
