= Santa Teresita, Belize =

Village in the Cayo District of central interior Belize

Santa Teresita is a village in the Cayo District of central interior Belize. The village is in an agricultural region with the most frequent crops being citrus and banana. It is one of 192 municipalities administered at the village level in the country for census taking purposes. The village had a population of 83 in 2010. This represents roughly 0.1 % of the district's total population. No census record was taken for the village in 2000.
