= Maya Center =

Village in Belize

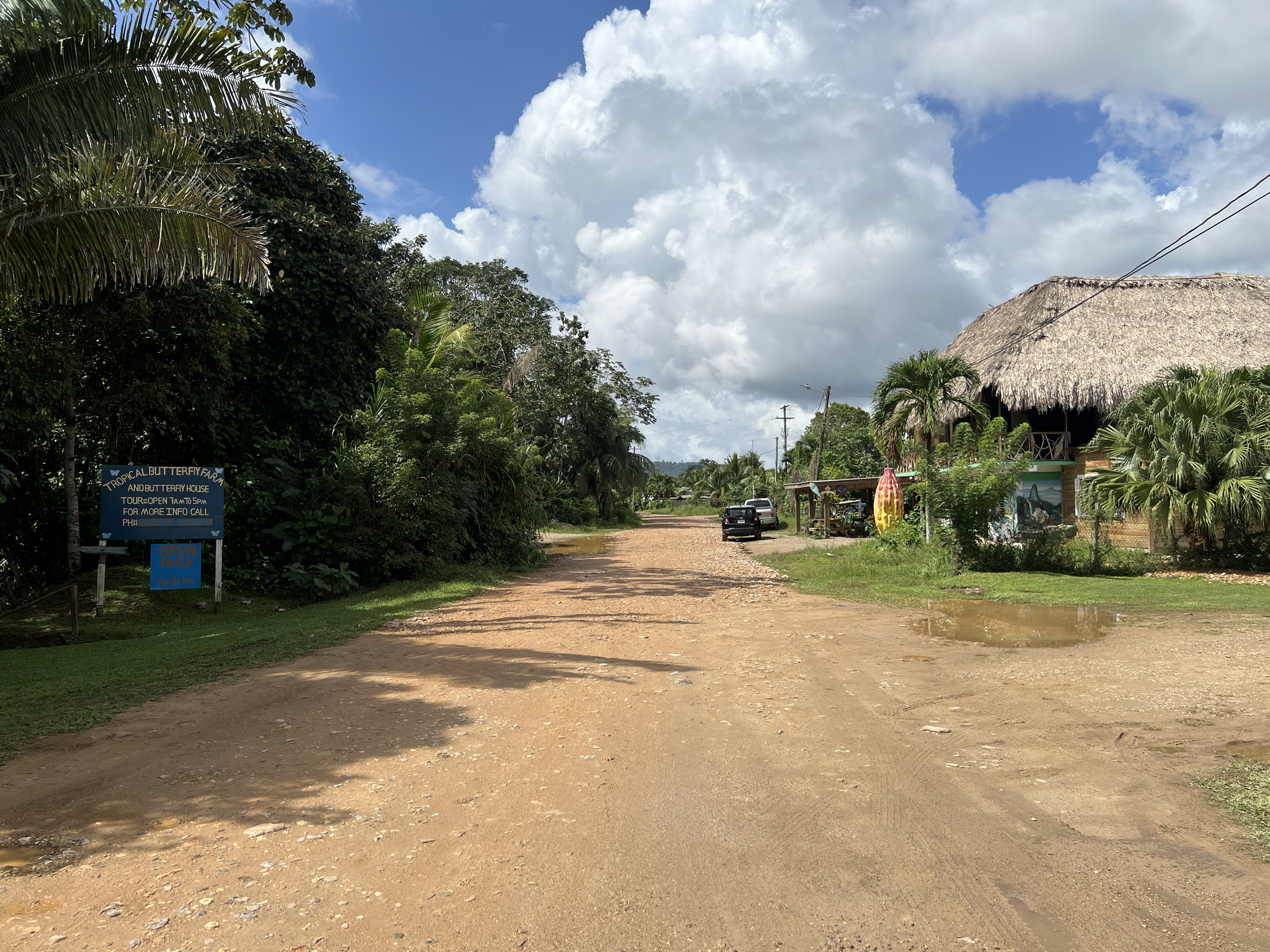
- The road to Cockscomb Basin Wildlife Sanctuary

- Location within Belize
- Coordinates: 16.7983°N 88.3826°W
- Country: Belize
- District: Stann Creek District
- Elevation: 25 m (82 ft)

Population (2010)
  - Total: 386
- Time zone: UTC-6 (Central)

Maya Center (also spelled Maya Centre) is a village in the Stann Creek District of Belize. It is located on the road to the Cockscomb Basin Wildlife Sanctuary. According to the 2010 census, Maya Center has a population of 386 people in 87 households.
