= Teakettle, Belize =

Teakettle
- Location within Belize
- Coordinates: 17.224688°N 88.852604°W
- Country: Belize
- District: Cayo District
- Constituency: Cayo South
- Elevation: 80 m (260 ft)

Population (2010)
  - Total: 1,747
- Time zone: UTC-6 (Central)

Teakettle is a settlement in the Cayo District of Belize in Central America. According to the 2010 census, Teakettle had a population of 1,747 people in 360 households.

== History ==
On 28 October 2011 eleven students mysteriously fell ill during school and were transported to the Western Regional Hospital in Belmopan. Doctors have not found out the origin of the illness.

== Location and geographic setting ==
Teakettle is situated on the George Price Highway five miles west of Belmopan.

== Climate ==
Teakettle has a tropical climate, with little temperature difference between seasons, but a pronounced rainy season.
