= St. Ann's, Belize =

Village in Belize

Coordinates: 17°50′07″N 88°18′46″W

St. Ann's is a village in the Belize District of the central-east coastal region of Belize. Though the area was originally inhabited by Mayans this village was established in the region of Belize that was first settled by Europeans. It is one of 192 municipalities administered at the village level in the country for census taking purposes. The village had a population of 97 in 2010. This represents roughly 0.1% of the district's total population. No census record was taken for the village in 2020.
