= Selena, Belize =

Selena is a village in the Cayo District of central interior Belize. The village is in an agricultural region with the most frequent crops being citrus and banana. It is one of 192 municipalities administered at the village level in the country for census taking purposes. The village had a population of 201 in 2010. This represents roughly 0.3 % of the district's total population. This was a 5.8% increase from 190 people recorded in the 2000 census.
