= Local government in Belize =

Local government in Belize consists of four types of local authorities: city councils, town councils, village councils and community councils. Some rural communities also have an alcalde, a local magistrate who performs both administrative and judicial functions.

== City and town councils ==
There are two city councils (Belize City and Belmopan) and seven town councils in Belize. As of 2000, the seven town councils are Benque Viejo del Carmen, Corozal Town, Dangriga, Orange Walk Town, Punta Gorda, San Ignacio, and San Pedro.

City and town councils consist of a mayor and a number of councillors (ten in Belize City, six in Belmopan and the towns). Mayors and councillors are directly elected to three-year terms, using the first past the post system. The most recent municipal elections were held in March 2021. The mayor (except in Belize City) acts as the chief executive of the city or town, and allocates portfolios to the other councillors.

City and town councils have a wide range of functions. According to the Government of Belize website, "urban authorities are responsible for street maintenance and lighting, drains, refuse collection and public cemeteries. They also have discretionary powers over other services including infrastructure, parks and playgrounds, markets and slaughter-houses, public libraries, public buildings and the amenities of the city or town centre."

== Village councils ==
Village councils began in the 1950s and were formalised by the Village Councils Act 1999 which legalised their role and authority to administer village affairs. Villages are declared by ministerial order and one qualification for village status is a minimum of 200 voters. The council is required to meet at least once every quarter and has discretionary powers to appoint committees. Decisions of village committees are subject to the approval of their council.

There are over 180 village councils in Belize. Village councils consist of a chairperson and six councillors, who are directly elected by registered villagers.

Village councils have existed in Belize on an informal basis since the 1950s, but they were first put on a statutory footing by the Village Councils Act 1999. After the Act came into force, the first elections for village councils were held in March and April 2001.

Village councils have a more limited range of functions than town councils. They "encourage and assist co-operation on economic and social development and general welfare", and can run community centres and advise the national government on the affairs of the locality.

== Alcaldes ==
Some rural villages in Belize also have an alcalde: a local magistrate who has both an administrative and a judicial role. In addition to presiding over local courts, alcaldes are responsible for managing communal land and act as school officers. This form of local governance is practised mainly in Mayan communities in Belize, but any rural community can choose to appoint an alcalde.

== Mennonite Communities ==
Mennonite Communities have their own local government structures. For example, in Spanish Lookout, 3 Vorstehers are elected for 3 year terms. They also have their Surveying Committee, Lands Committee, Parks Committee, Export Board, etc. These committee members meet once a month to discuss and vote on community issues. Once a year, an AGM is held where community members vote on committee and vorsteher elections and on other important topics.
