= Punta Gorda, Belize =

Town in Toledo, Belize

Punta Gorda
- Town
- Punta Gorda Town
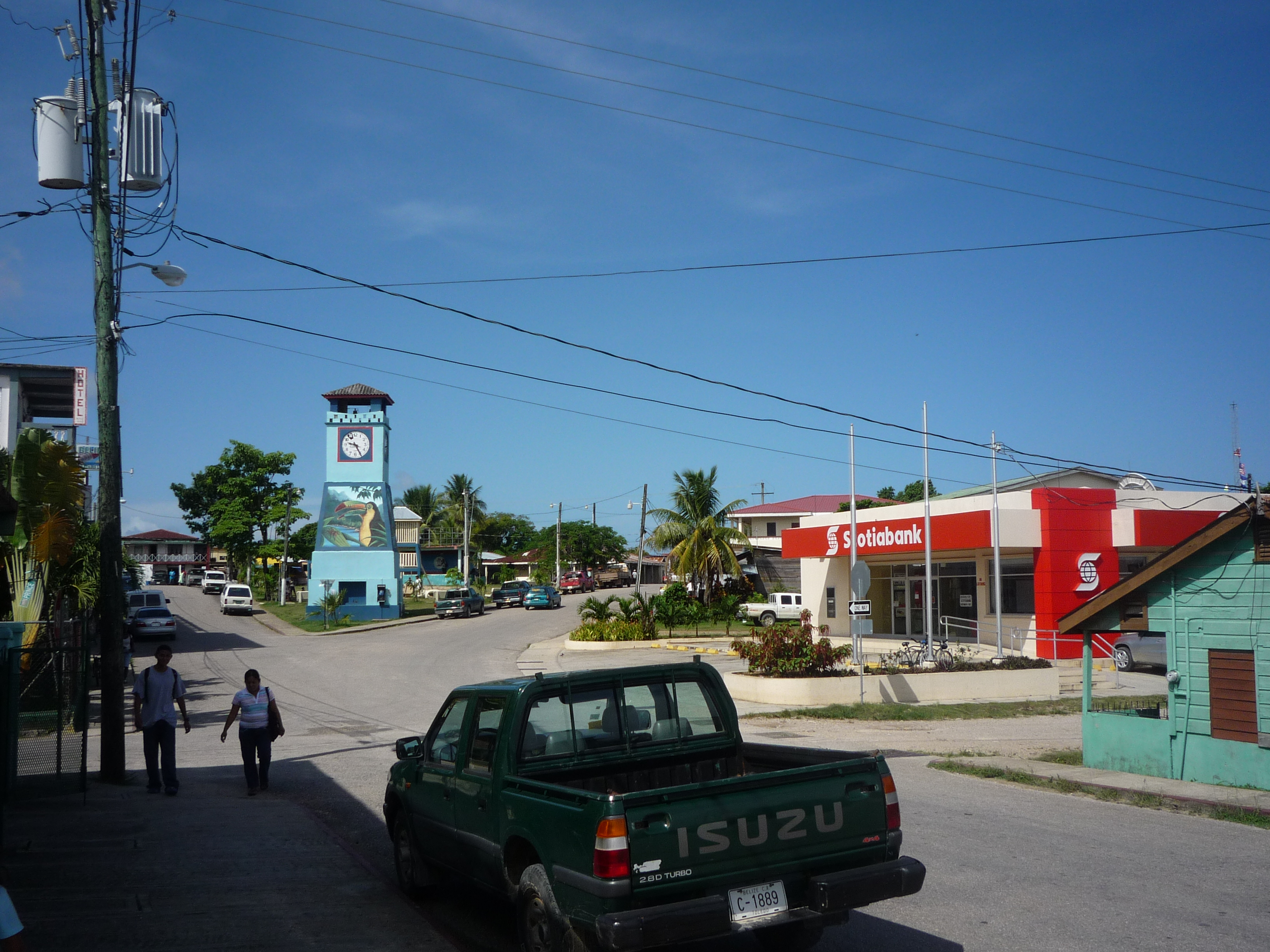
- Punta Gorda Town Square
- Nickname: P.G.
- Location within Belize
- Coordinates: 16°05′56″N 88°48′34″W
- Country: Belize
- District: Toledo
- Constituency: Toledo East
- Founded: 1802

Government
  - Mayor: Carlos Galvez (PUP)
- Elevation: 4.5 m (15 ft)

Population (2010)
  - Total: 5,351
  - Estimate (2016): 6,027
- Time zone: UTC-06:00 (CST)
- Climate: Af
- Website: www.puntagordabelize.com

Punta Gorda, declared a town on Monday, 21 January 1895, known locally as P.G., is the capital and largest town of Toledo District in southern Belize. Punta Gorda is the southernmost sizable town in the nation, with a population of about 5,000 people. Although the town bears a Spanish name, its inhabitants are mostly Kriol/English-speaking and are primarily of Garifuna, East Indian, Kriol, and Maya descent.

Punta Gorda is a seaport and fishing town on the Caribbean Sea. It was a small fishing village before it was settled by a number of Garifuna emigrants from Honduras in 1823. The Garifuna refer to the town as Peini. The town is about fifteen feet above sea level.

== Demographics ==
At the time of the 2010 census, Punta Gorda had a population of 5,351. Of these, 24.2% were Garifuna, 17.2% Mestizo, 14.2% Ketchi Maya, 13.8% Mixed, 10.5% Creole, 8.3% East Indian, 8.1% Mopan Maya, 1.4% Caucasian, 0.9% Asian, 0.5% African, 0.1% Hindu, 0.1% Mennonite, 0.1% Yucatec Maya and 0.4% others.

=== Religion ===
St. Peter Claver Catholic parish, with a large elementary school, serves the predominantly Catholic population of the town.

== Climate ==
The climate is tropical rainforest (Köppen: Af), similar to that found in the Amazon Basin, with precipitation being high and with temperatures always above 25 °C on average every month.

Climate data for Punta Gorda, Belize (1991–2020)
Month	Jan	Feb	Mar	Apr	May	Jun	Jul	Aug	Sep	Oct	Nov	Dec	Year
Mean daily maximum °C (°F)	28.2 (82.8)	29.5 (85.1)	30.6 (87.1)	32.0 (89.6)	32.2 (90.0)	31.9 (89.4)	31.3 (88.3)	32.0 (89.6)	32.3 (90.1)	31.4 (88.5)	29.9 (85.8)	29.1 (84.4)	30.9 (87.6)
Daily mean °C (°F)	23.4 (74.1)	24.7 (76.5)	25.3 (77.5)	26.9 (80.4)	27.5 (81.5)	27.5 (81.5)	27.1 (80.8)	27.3 (81.1)	27.4 (81.3)	26.7 (80.1)	25.1 (77.2)	23.8 (74.8)	26.1 (79.0)
Mean daily minimum °C (°F)	18.6 (65.5)	19.8 (67.6)	20.1 (68.2)	21.9 (71.4)	22.8 (73.0)	23.1 (73.6)	22.9 (73.2)	22.5 (72.5)	22.6 (72.7)	22.1 (71.8)	20.3 (68.5)	18.6 (65.5)	21.3 (70.3)
Average rainfall mm (inches)	170.6 (6.72)	94.7 (3.73)	73.4 (2.89)	82.0 (3.23)	205.1 (8.07)	447.0 (17.60)	709.8 (27.94)	629.7 (24.79)	528.8 (20.82)	361.4 (14.23)	264.8 (10.43)	178.5 (7.03)	3,745.8 (147.48)
Average rainy days (≥ 1.0 mm)	12	8	6	5	11	18	22	20	18	16	13	12	161
Source: National Meteorological Service of Belize

== Tourism ==
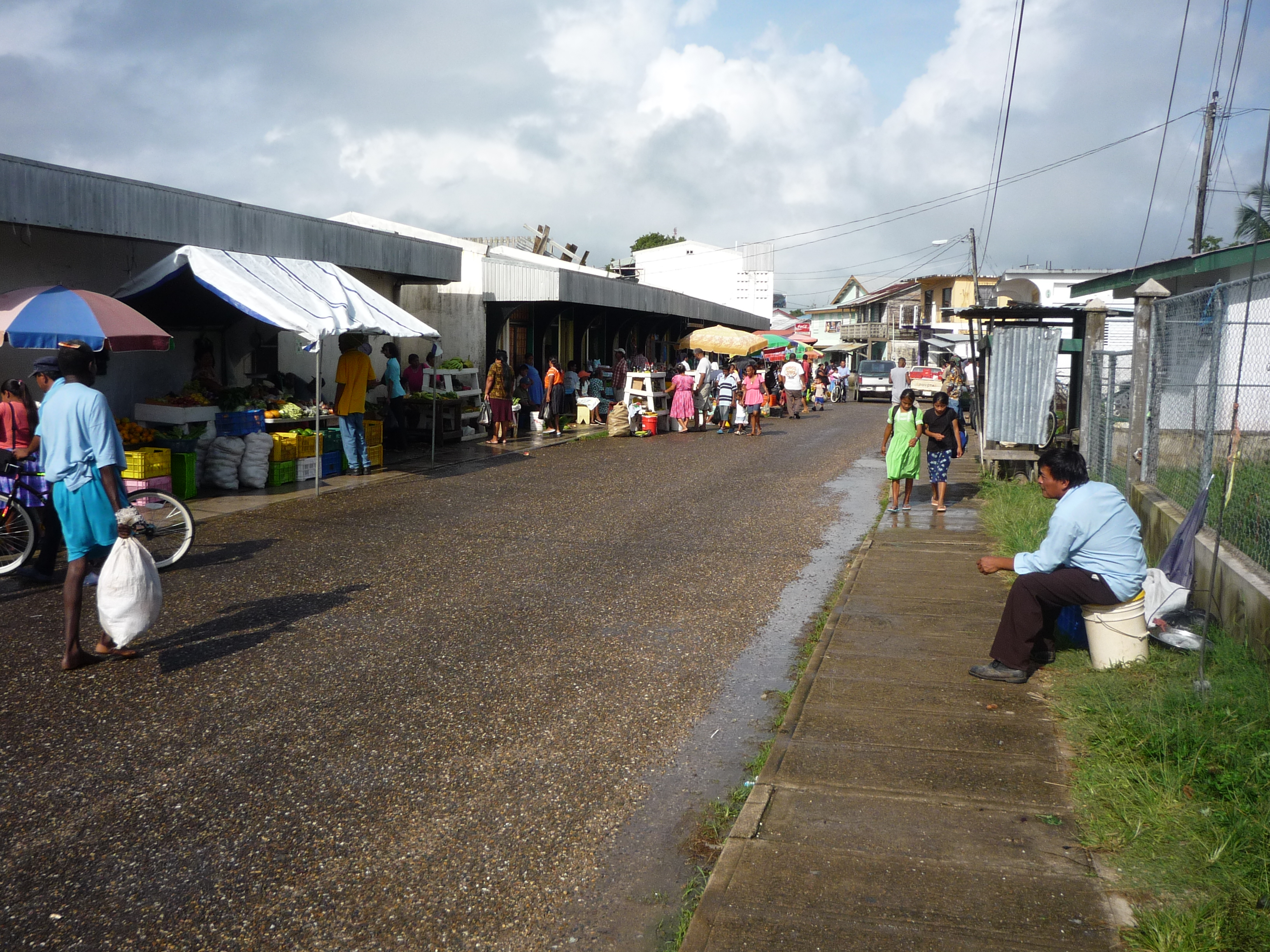
Punta Gorda town market

There are several hotels in Punta Gorda that draw tourists with their ocean views. Punta Gorda is also a gateway to several well-regarded jungle accommodations, The Lodge at Big Falls, Copal Tree Lodge, and Hickatee Cottages. Every May, the town hosts the Toledo Cacao Festival, held over the Commonwealth Day holiday weekend, which celebrates Toledo district's ancient and modern-day links with cacao and chocolate.

== Transport ==
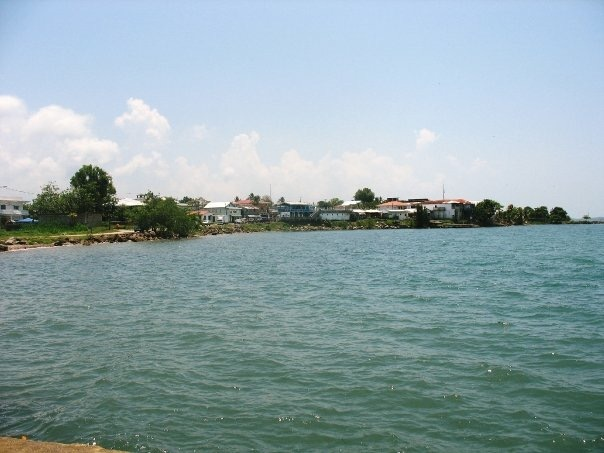
Punta Gorda Town from Fisherman's Pier.

Punta Gorda is the main point of transportation for people visiting the Toledo district and the offshore southern cayes. There is a small airport which serves domestic flights from Maya Island Air and Tropic Air. James Bus Line is based in Punta Gorda and offers a regular service to points north, such as Independence, Dangriga, Belmopan, and Belize City. Travel from Belize International Airport (BZE) to Punta Gorda with a convenient private shuttle offers a door to door transportation service. Water taxis offer daily crossings to Puerto Barrios and twice weekly service to Livingston in Guatemala. Unlike the purpose-built water taxis plying the routes between Belize city and the northern cays, the services from Punta Gorda are provided by small, open boats. Punta Gorda will have railway lines to Dangriga and Belize City that are currently in the feasibility study being conducted by CRECG.

== Health care ==
The town is served by Punta Gorda Polyclinic, as well as a few private doctors.

== Education ==
Punta Gorda is served by 3 primary schools: St. Peter Claver School, Bethel Seventh Day Adventist School, and Punta Gorda Methodist School. It also has one high school, the Toledo Community College, and the Punta Gorda campus of the University of Belize.

== Notable people ==
Notable people from Punta Gorda include paranda musician Paul Nabor, Belize's "Queen of Brukdown", Leela Vernon and Destiny Wagner, Miss Earth 2021, the first Belizean woman to win the Miss Earth title, and the first to win any of the Big Four beauty pageants.

== See also ==
- Green & Black's
