= Toledo District =

District of Belize

Coordinates: 16°20′N 88°45′W

- District
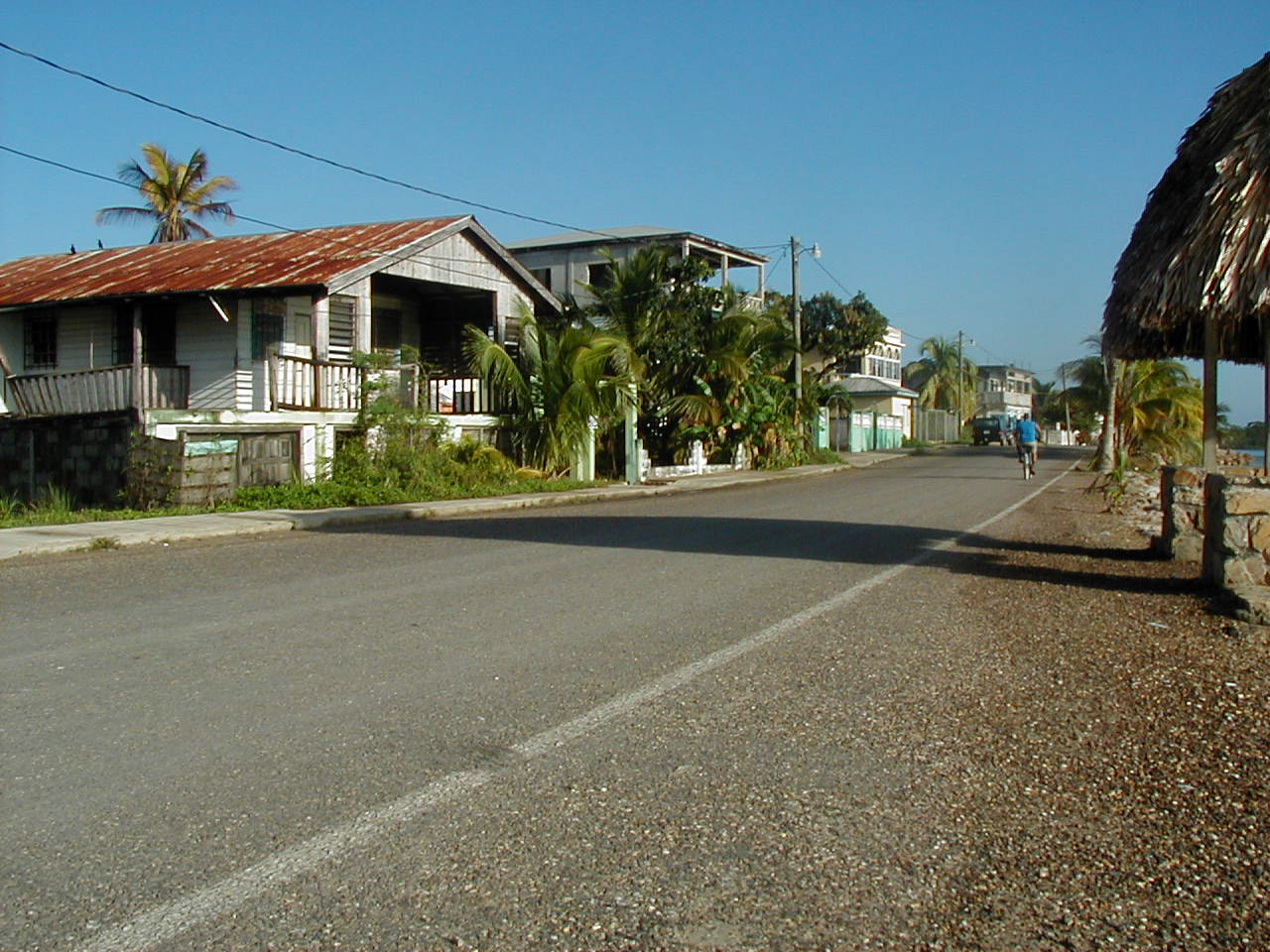
- Punta Gorda is the main town in the Toledo District.

- Location of the district in Belize
- Country: Belize
- Capital: Punta Gorda

Area
  - Total: 4,649 km^{2} (1,795 sq mi)

Population (2024 estimate)
  - Total: 38,259
  - Density: 8.230/km^{2} (21.31/sq mi)

Ethnic groups (2022 census)
  - Mayan: 64.7% (Note: 49.4% Kʼicheʼ, 15.3% Mopan, 0.0% Yucatec)
  - Hispanic/ Mestizo: 19.2%
  - Creole: 5.0%
  - Garifuna: 4.1%
  - East Indian: 4.1%
  - Mennonite: 2.0%
  - White: 0.4%
  - Chinese: 0.2%
  - Indian: 0.0%
  - Other: 0.2%

Languages spoken (2022 census)
  - Mayan: 59.7% (Note: 44.9% Qʼeqchiʼ, 14.7% Mopan, 0.1% Yucatec)
  - English: 55.9%
  - Creole: 41.9%
  - Spanish: 22.1%
  - German: 1.6% (Note: Includes speakers of both Plautdietsch and Standard German)
  - Garifuna: 1.5%
  - Chinese: 0.1%
  - Hindi: 0.0%
  - Other: 0.1%
- ISO 3166 code: BZ-TOL
- Website: visittoledobelize.com

Toledo is the southernmost and least populated district in Belize. Punta Gorda is the District capital. According to the Human Development Index (HDI), it is the second most developed region in the country. The district has a diverse topography which features rainforests, extensive cave networks, coastal lowland plains, and offshore cays. Toledo is home to a wide range of cultures such as Mopan, Kekchi Maya, Creole, Garifuna, East Indians, Mennonites, Mestizos, and descendants of US Confederate settlers.

== Geography ==
The District has many villages, including Monkey River Town and the Toledo Settlement; the Maya villages of San Pedro Columbia, Blue Creek, Indian Creek, Santa Cruz, San Antonio, San Pablo, San Jose, San Felipe; and the Garifuna village of Barranco. It also has a number of Maya ruins, including Lubaantun, Nim Li Punit, Uxbenka, and Pusilha. According to a 2022 mid-year census estimate, Toledo District had a population of 41,537 people, 6,801 of whom lived in Punta Gorda.

== Economy ==
The economy of Toledo relies heavily upon agriculture. Crops grown include beans and corn, as well as rice, which is sold to the Big Falls Rice Mill. Cacao is grown organically and sold via the Toledo Cacao Growers Association to Green & Black's for their renowned Maya Gold chocolate, as well as to chocolatiers within Belize. The District's ancient and modern-day links with chocolate are celebrated annually in May (Commonwealth Day Holiday weekend) at the Toledo Cacao Festival. Farmers grow additional crops such as coffee, yams, sweet potato, hot chilli peppers, avocado, oranges and plantain for sale at the market in Punta Gorda, held each Monday, Wednesday, Friday, and Saturday.

Fishermen practice small-scale fishing from their dug-out canoes, as well as diving for lobster and conch during the open season. The Port Honduras Marine Reserve just north of Punta Gorda Town is a protected area, and Toledo's waters are regarded as the permit capital of Belize. Many traditional fishermen have trained as fly-fishing guides through the alternative livelihood projects offered by local conservation groups.

Tourism is an important and relatively new industry for Toledo. Once regarded as an area only for the hardy and adventurous, the opening of new tourist accommodations and the development of tours, as well as a growing awareness of the district's high proportion of protected areas, wildlife, birding and the offshore cays, have resulted in Toledo being recognized as an important emerging destination.

== Demographics ==
=== Ethnicity ===
Ethnicity
| Ethnicity | 2010 | | 2022 | |
| % | Number | % | Number | % |
|---|---|---|---|---|
| Qʼeqchi Maya | 13,691 | 45.81% | 18,352 | 49.43% |
| Mestizo | 5,324 | 17.81% | 7,114 | 19.16% |
| Mopan Maya | 4,507 | 15.08% | 5,682 | 15.30% |
| Creole | 1,022 | 3.42% | 1,840 | 4.95% |
| East Indian | 1,421 | 4.75% | 1,518 | 4.09% |
| Garifuna | 1,417 | 4.74% | 1,515 | 4.08% |
| European: * German (Mennonite) * British (Anglo-Celtic) | 480; 239; 241 | 1.61% 0.80% 0.81% | 861; 729; 132 | 2.32% 1.96% 0.35% |
| Other | 189 | 0.63% | 144 | 0.39% |
| Not stated | – | – | 98 | 0.26% |
| Mixed | 1,834 | 6.14% | – | – |
| Total | 29,885 | 100% | 37,124 | 100% |

=== Language ===
According to the 2010 census, Mayan languages are spoken by 68.4% of the population. This makes Toledo the only district in Belize where native languages are spoken by a majority.

On the 2010 census, about 18% of the population were native Spanish speakers. Only 12.6% of the population had English as their first language, making it by far one of the least English-speaking districts of Belize.

== Gallery ==
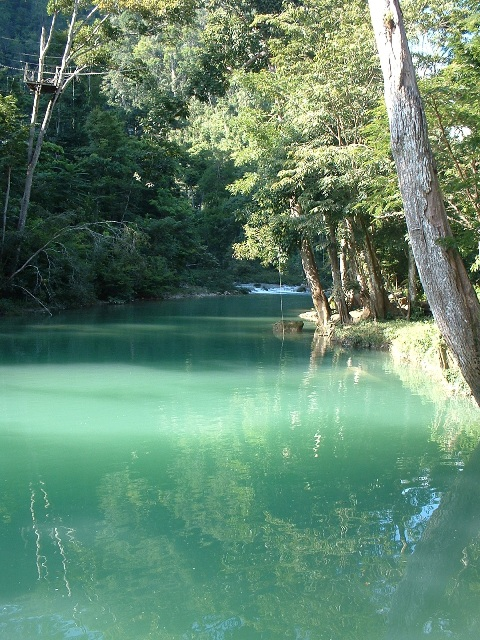
Blue Creek River, Belize

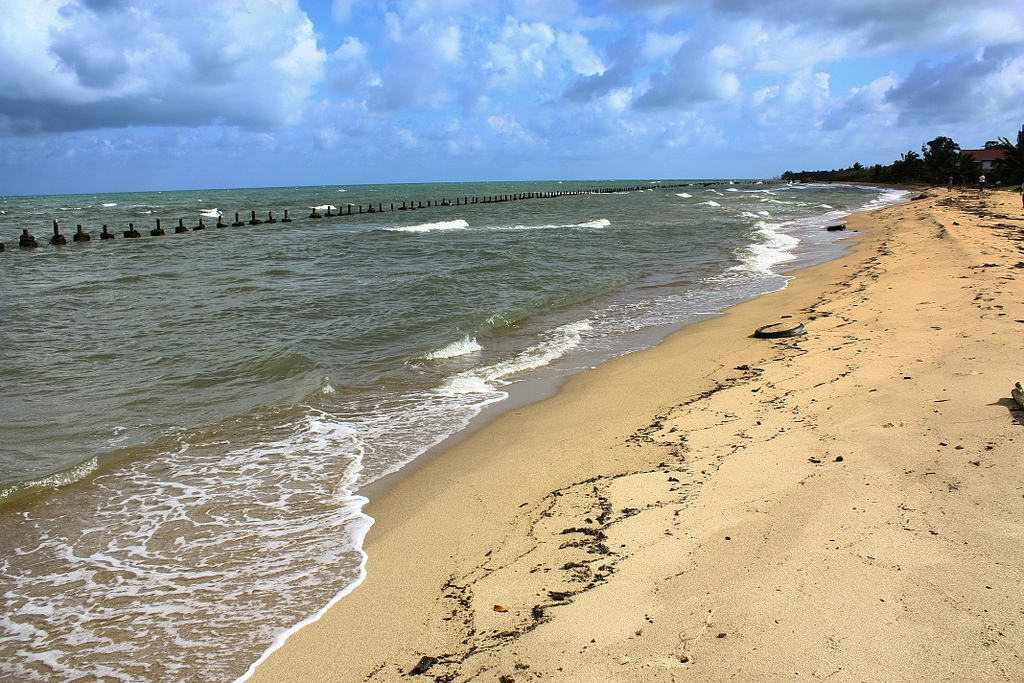
Monkey River Village

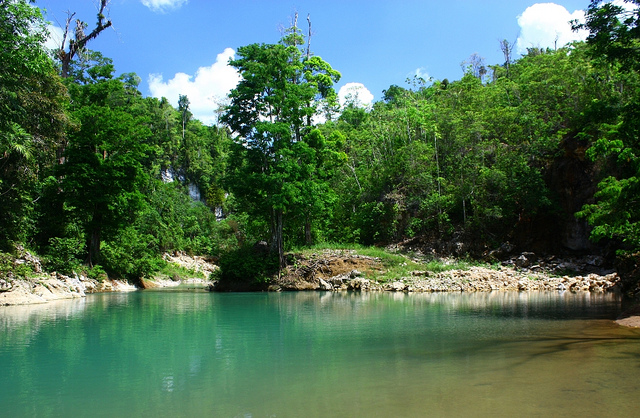
San Miguel Branch

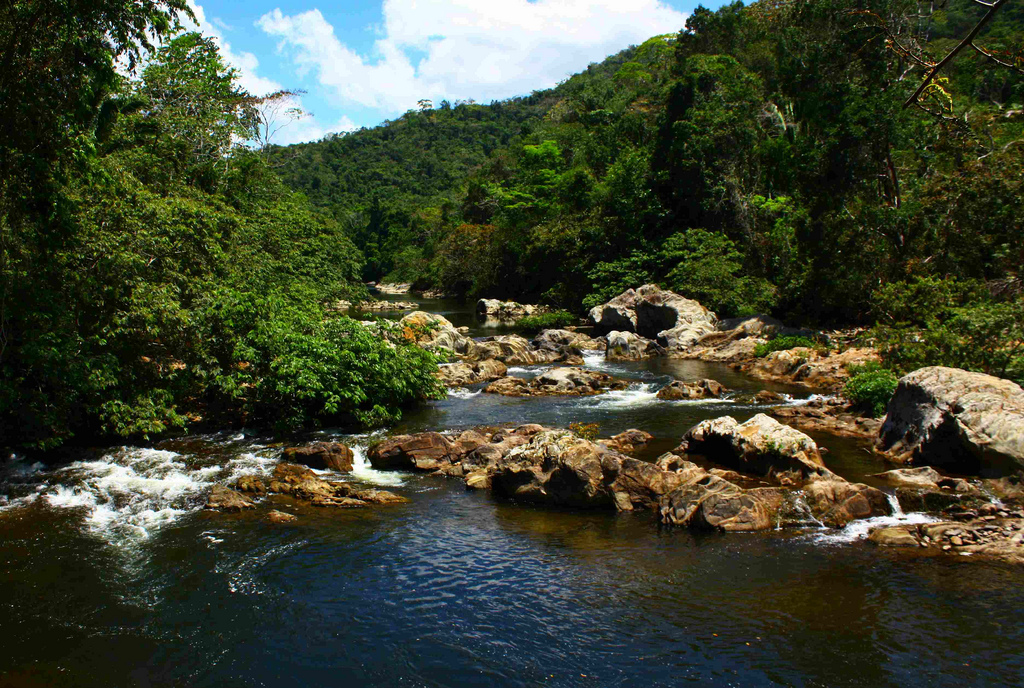
Swasey Branch

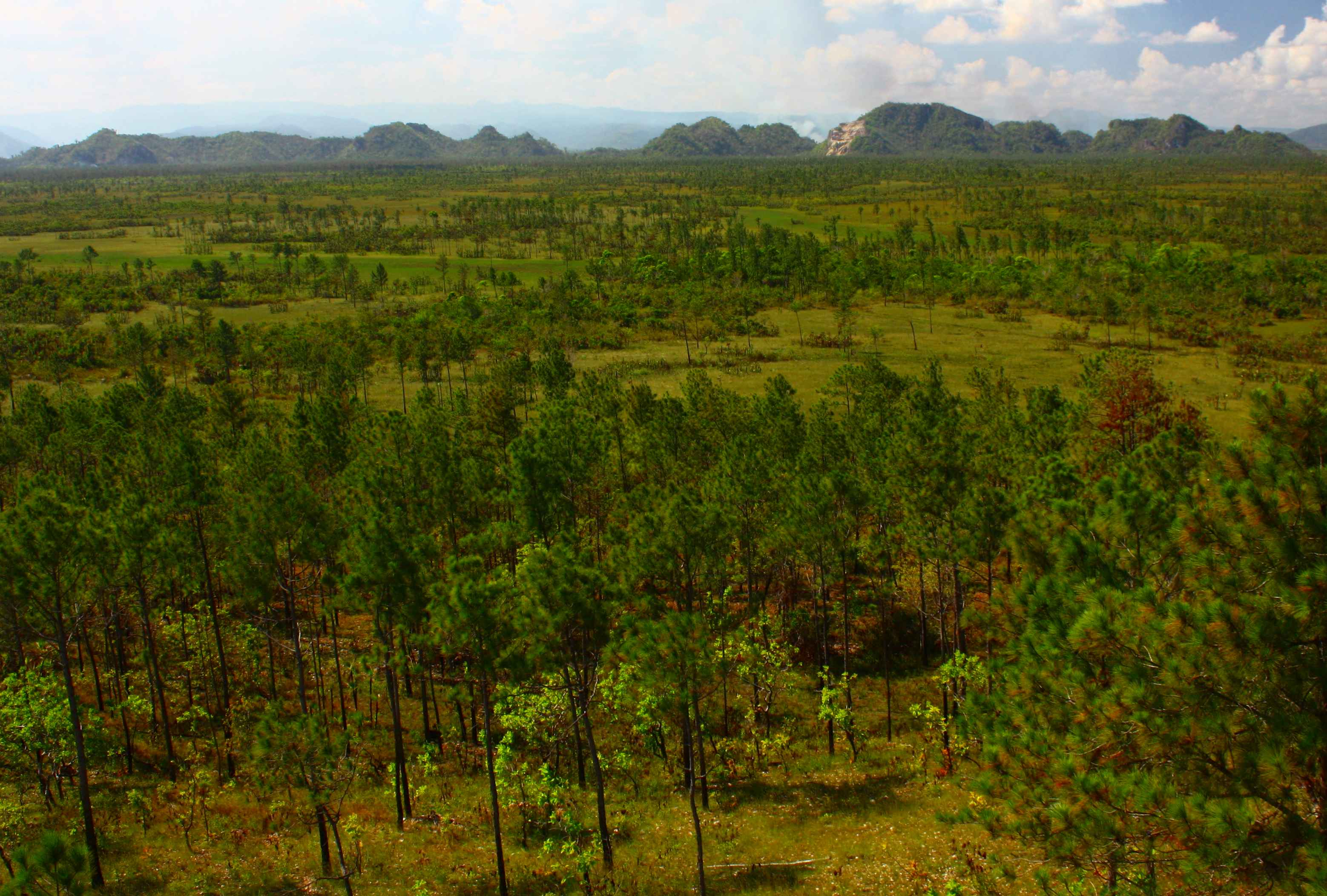
Bladen Reserve looking towards the Maya Mountains

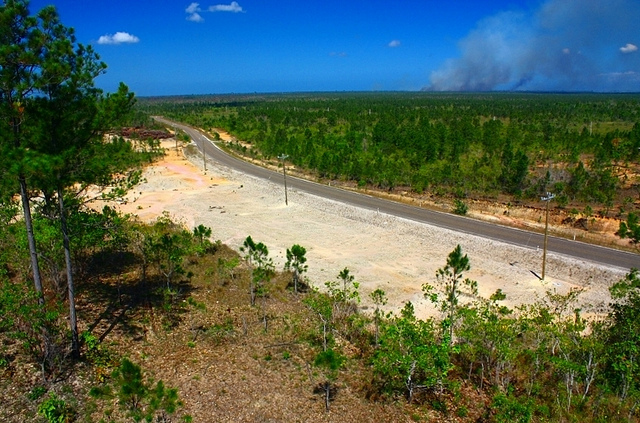
Southern Highway

== Transportation ==
The Toledo District is served by the paved Thomas Vincent Ramos Highway, as well as several bush roads to the many rural villages in the District. Regular bus service is provided by Punta Gorda-based James Bus Line, shuttling passengers between the other districts, and Punta Gorda is served by several daily commuter flights on Tropic Air, Maya Island Air and several small, family-run bus services that transport passengers to and from the rural villages.

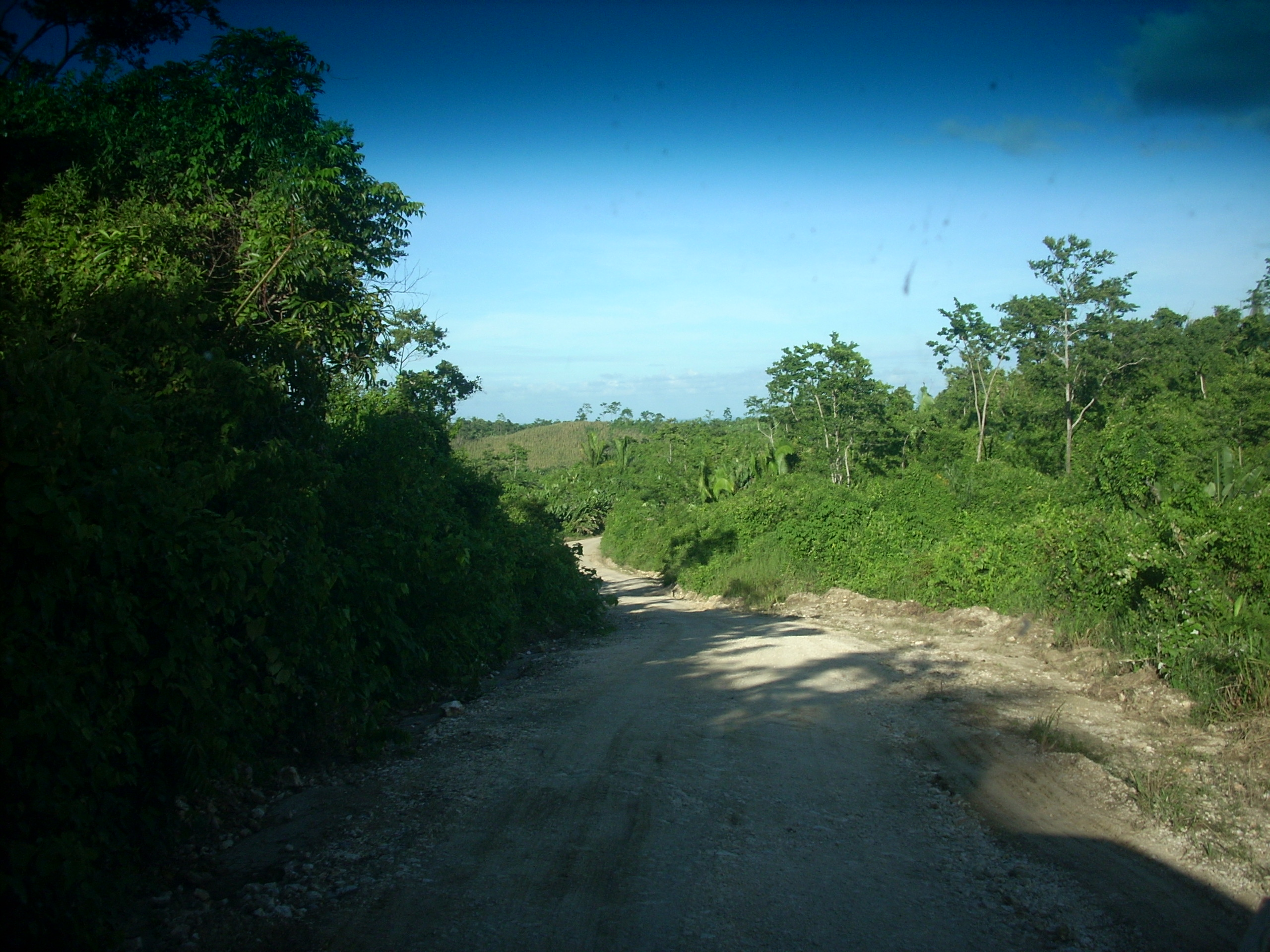
Dump-Jalacte Road looking East just East of Santa Cruz Village

== Events ==
Each year, during the Commonwealth Day weekend, Toledo hosts the Chocolate Festival of Belize. The festival features chocolatiers from across the country as well as chocolate-related arts and crafts. According to the project coordinator for the Toledo Cacao Growers Association Thomas Tillett, the Association currently has a membership of about 1,100 cacao farmers.

== Indian Reservations ==
- Aguacate Indian Reservation, Toledo
- Black Creek Indian Reservation, Toledo
- Blue Creek Indian Reservation, Toledo
- Crique Sarco Indian Reservation, Toledo
- Graham Creek Indian Reservation, Toledo
- Hinchasones Indian Reservation, Toledo
- Machaca Indian Reservation, Toledo
- Xpicilha Indian Reservation, Toledo

== Notable architecture ==
Several significant ancient Mayan sites are extant in ruined form in the Toledo District. Nim Li Punit is a Classic Period Mayan site with ballcourts and carved stelae. Lubaantun is a drystone constructed site with ruined pyramids and stone tombs.

== Notable people ==
- Cristina Coc, Maya community leader
- Juan Coy, politician

== In popular culture ==
- The Forgotten District, a documentary film about ecotourism in Toledo
