= Mopan people =

Mopan
Total population
- 13,917

Regions with significant populations
- Belize: 10,557
- Guatemala: 3,360

Languages
- Mopan, Spanish, English, Kriol

Religion
- Catholic, Evangelicalism, Maya religion

The Mopan people are an Indigenous, sub-ethnic group of the Maya peoples. They are native to regions of Belize and Guatemala.

== History ==
In the 18th and 19th centuries, the British forced the Mopan out of Belize and into Petén, Guatemala. There, they endured forced labour and high taxation, causing them to migrate back into Belize. The Mopan originally settled near modern Pueblo Viejo, but Guatemalan officials claimed that they were still within bounds of Guatemala, so they moved further east around 1889 and founded San Antonio.

In the 2010 Census, 10,557 Belizeans reported their ethnicity as Mopan Maya. This constituted approximately 3% of the population.

== Culture ==
The Mopan Maya people practice a spirituality that relates to the Maya Catholic Faith. The prominent factor that has caused the decline of these traditional practices is the influence of Protestant evangelical missionaries.

There is an absence of written traditions of the Mopan Maya people, so the preservation of their culture relies on oral transmission.

=== Language ===
The language of the Mopan people is Mopan language. It is a member of the Yucatec Maya language branch of the Mayan languages. Several thousand Mopan people, located in Belize and Guatemala, speak the Mopan language.

=== Religion ===
The cacao tree, known as cucu, has played a significant role in the religious life of the Mopan Maya people and is used in ceremonies. Both the tree itself and the beans that it produces are said to contain spirits.

The traditional religion of the Mopan people is Maya-Catholic. In this religion, the Mopan Maya people consume cacao beverages at religious celebrations. However, since the 1970s, numerous Mopan villagers have left the Maya Catholic faith and joined Protestant groups. As a result, they reject beliefs related to spiritual aspects of the natural world.

=== Agriculture ===
The economy of the Mopan Community is based on agriculture. The Mopan people have a long history of being small holder, independent farmers. The members of the Mopan community have extensive knowledge in the local flora and fauna.

The Mopan people cultivate maize, beans, and plant rice. These crops serve as cash crops. The cacao tree, and the cultivation of Cacao, has been financially beneficial for the Mopan people. They have been able to establish relationships with companies interested in the purchasing of Cacao, including the Hummingbird Highway Hershey Company and Green and Blacks.

== See also ==
- Chinamita
