= Qʼeqchiʼ =

Maya people

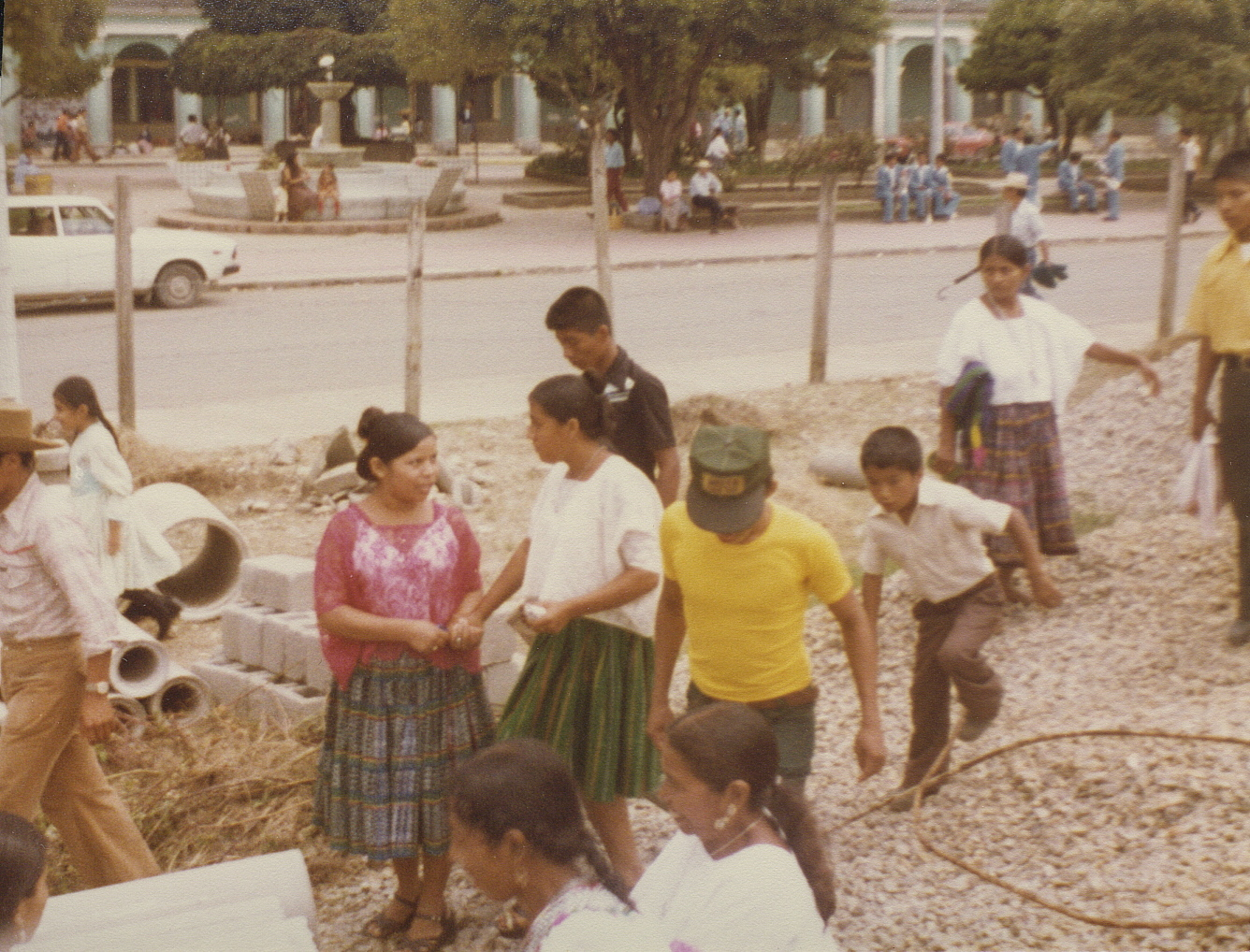
- Indigenous group in Cobán

Total population
- 1,370,007

Regions with significant populations
- Guatemala; Alta Verapaz; Petén; Izabal; El Quiché: 979,220; 147,530; 110,761; 77,974
- Belize: 11,143
- Mexico: 2,963
- El Salvador: 245
- Honduras: ?

Languages
- Qʼeqchiʼ, Spanish, Kriol, English

Religion
- Roman Catholic, Evangelical, Mennonite, Maya religion, recent small communities of Eastern Orthodox and Oriental Orthodox in West Guatemala.

Qʼeqchiʼ (/qʼeqt͡ʃiʔ/) (Kʼekchiʼ in the former orthography, or simply Kekchi in many English-language contexts, such as in Belize) are a Maya people of Guatemala, Belize and Mexico. Their Indigenous language is the Qʼeqchiʼ language.

Before the beginning of the Spanish conquest of Guatemala in the 1520s, Qʼeqchiʼ settlements were concentrated in what are now the departments of Alta Verapaz and Baja Verapaz. Over the course of the succeeding centuries a series of land displacements, resettlements, persecutions and migrations resulted in a wider dispersal of Qʼeqchiʼ communities into other regions of Guatemala (Izabal, Petén, El Quiché), southern Belize (Toledo District), and smaller numbers in southern Mexico (Chiapas, Campeche). While most notably present in northern Alta Verapaz and southern Petén, contemporary Qʼeqchiʼ language-speakers are the most widely spread geographically of all Maya peoples in Guatemala.

== History ==
The Q'eqchi' originally came from a large recorded migration that started from central Mexico towards the Guatemalan highlands, where they settled and developed as a sedentary society characterized by the cultivation of corn, specifically, it was in the present-day department of Alta Verapaz where they had their pre-Hispanic development.

Not much more is known about the lives and history of the Qʼeqchiʼ people prior to being conquered by Spanish conquistadors; however, it is known that they were a Maya group located in the central highlands and northern lowlands of Guatemala. Their land was formerly known as Tezulutlan or "the land of war" and the Qʼeqchiʼ people were ruled by a king and had their own laws and government. When the Spanish began their conquest, the Qʼeqchiʼ were hard to control due to their dispersed population. Bartolomé de las Casas was given permission to try to convert the Qʼeqchiʼ people to Christianity, however, only a small portion was converted and the church lost all ability to govern the Qʼeqchiʼ. This led to the exploitation of the Qʼeqchiʼ by plantation owners and slavers.

During the nineteenth-century plantation agriculture was a big part of the Qʼeqchiʼ people's lives. This led to the seizure of the Qʼeqchiʼ's communal land by plantations and the service of the Qʼeqchiʼ to farm the plantations. By 1877, all communal landownership was abolished by the government which prompted some of the Qʼeqchiʼ to move to Belize. This seizure of communal land along with the effects of the Spanish Conquest created long-lasting poverty in the Qʼeqchiʼ people.

== Religion and culture ==
=== Religion ===
Traditionally the Qʼeqchiʼ people believe in the Tzuultaqʼa (a compound of tzuul "hill" and taq'a "valley"), male and female guardian deities which inhabit the local mountains. However they have mixed those beliefs with the beliefs of the Catholic church. Some Qʼeqchiʼ believe in the Christian God and those who practice Roman Catholicism venerate the saints. They also believe that Tzuultaqʼa preside over nature and dwell in the caves of the mountains. They also have three specific religious specialists that are from the Tzuultaqʼa side of their religion. These are:

1. The ilonel or aj ilonel (from ilok "to see"), a curer who uses different types of herbs and ceremonies.
2. The aj q'e (from q'ehik "to predict"), a seer who advises and makes predictions.
3. The aj tuul (from tuulak "to bewitch"), a sorcerer who can cast spells.

They also believe in similar rituals to those in other Latin American countries like the celebration of the Day of the Dead. They also practice a burial ritual which consists of wrapping the body in a petate (palm frond mat). They are then buried with items they would need for the journey into the afterlife.

=== Marriage ===
Marriages in the Qʼeqchiʼ culture are arranged by the parents of the children. The parents of both children meet over time and if all goes well the children are married. This happens at the ages of 12 to 15 for the women and 15 to 18 for the males. After that the family would look very similar to the normal family picture; a mother, a father, and a couple of children. When it comes to inheritance parents usually give the property and assets to the child who offers to care for the parents during their life.

== Food and agriculture ==
The traditional dish of the mexican Q'eqchi' people of Campeche is the Ch'ajomik, a preparation of butter, garlic, tomato, onions, coriander and dried chili, only in important dates such as towns festivities they prepare and consume a traditional dish called Kaq'ik.

The agricultural production of the Qʼeqchiʼ people consists mostly of subsistence farming. This means they only farm for the needs of their families not external markets. At first the Qʼeqchiʼ were polycultural. The plants they farmed were edible weeds, banana plants, and other companion crops. They also acquire some of their food from wild plants and some villages still hunt. However for most present day Qʼeqchiʼ people today their food comes from the corn fields. This comes mainly from a time when plantations dominated the Qʼeqchiʼ society. From the 1880s to around the 1940s the plantation owners forbid the growing of any crops other than corn and beans, so they could easily identify which crops belonged to them. This created a corn-dependent diet of the Qʼeqchiʼ people.

While corn doesn't prove very profitable for the Qʼeqchiʼ economy or their diet it does have other merits. The Qʼeqchiʼ use agriculture as a way to commune with their God in a 'physical and spiritual way'. It is seen as working alongside their God in the creation of a new life. All the parts of planting, cultivating, and harvesting are all rituals and worship in their religion.

=== Contemporary Issues ===
The QHA, which is the Qʼeqchiʼ Healers Association, are an association of Indigenous healers that have come together to share their forms of conservation and botany. The QHA along with the Belize Indigenous Training Institute funded a project which would develop a traditional healing garden and culture center. Here the Qʼeqchiʼ Healers shared their similar methods that had been passed down to them in the hopes of preserving rare plant life and educating their community. They are preserving the biodiversity of their region by coming up with different options other than wild harvesting as well as was to propagate and cultivate many rare plant species.

== Notable members ==
- Cristina Coc, led 39 villages in Southern Belize in attaining a landmark ruling on the rights to their traditional lands and receipt of the Equator Prize
- Rodrigo Tot, awarded the Goldman Environment Prize in 2017
- Oscar Santis
