= Hispanic and Latin American Belizeans =

Hispanic Belizean
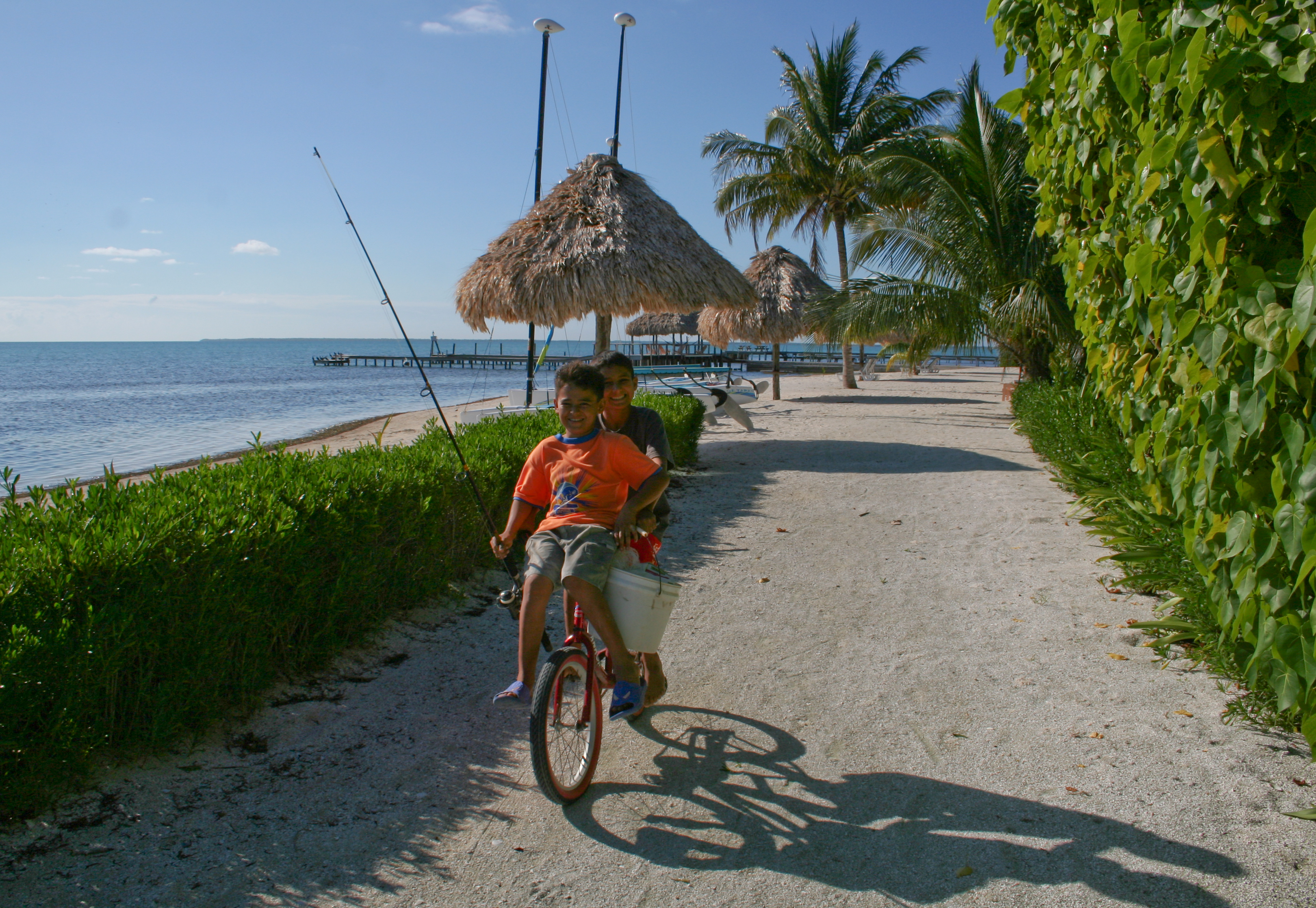
- Belizean children in Belize City

Total population
- 170,446 (52,9%) (2010 Belize Census)

Regions with significant populations
- Mainly in the Corozal, Orange Walk and Cayo Districts, in San Pedro (Ambergris Caye) and Caye Caulker

Languages
- Belizean Spanish · English · Kriol

Religion
- Predominantly Roman Catholic

Hispanic and Latin American Belizeans (Spanish: Beliceños) are Belizeans of full or partial Hispanic and Latin American descent. Currently, they account for around 52.9% of Belize's population.

Most Hispanic Belizeans are self-identified mestizos. Most mestizos speak Spanish, Kriol, and English fluently. The mestizo should not be confused with the Yucatec Maya who are also known as "Yucatecos" in Belize.

== History ==
=== First occupations and Spanish expeditions in Belize ===
In 1494 the Treaty of Tordesillas was signed, claiming the entire western New World for Spain, including what is now Belize. Then in the mid-16th century Spanish conquistadors explored this territory, declaring it a Spanish colony incorporated into the Captaincy General of Guatemala on December 27, 1527, when it was founded. In the second half of that century it was integrated into the government of Yucatan in Viceroyalty of New Spain. In 1530 the conqueror Francisco de Montejo attacked the Nachankan Maya and Belize but failed to subdue the Maya to Spanish rule, The first Spanish settlers that emigrated in Belize was in 1544, in Lamanai. It was there where the first church was built, in 1570. So, this city reflects considerable European influences. Spanish missionaries arriving in 1550 evangelized the area's population of Ch'ol people (a language group belonging to ethnic group Q'eqchi' people), reaching the Amatique Bay (present Province Verapaz, in the southern half of the current Belize).

However, few Spanish settled in the area because of the lack of the gold they'd come seeking and the strong resistance of the Maya people. The Spanish colonists living in Belize often fought against the Maya, who were affected by slavery and disease carried by the Spanish.

In 1618 there is evidence of evangelization in Pucté, northern Belize, and in 1621 at Tipu with the Mopans, in the central part of the territory. After the mid-16th century, there is little evidence of Spanish evangelization. An exception is the journey undertaken by a Dominican priest Father Jose Delgado in 1677. Delgado traveled to Belize from Bacalar, Quintana Roo. He was captured and stripped by some English near Rio de Texoc - probably the present Mullins River.

Between 1638 and 1695, the Mayans residing in Tipu enjoyed autonomy from Spanish rule. But in 1696, Spanish soldiers used Tipu as a base from which to pacify the area, with the support of missionary activities. In 1697 the Spanish conquered the Itzá, and in 1707 forcibly resettled the inhabitants of Tipu in the area of Lake Petén Itzá.

=== The struggle between Spain and Britain over control of Belize ===
In 1717, after the British settlement in Belize between the sixteenth and the seventeenth, the Spanish army led by Marshal Antonio Silva Figueroa and Lazo, governor of the Yucatan Peninsula, expelled the English from the Belize River delta area. But the British returned, prompting a series of Spanish incursions to expel them.

On 20 January 1783, shortly after the Treaty of Versailles, Britain and Spain signed a peace treaty in which Spain ceded to Britain a small part of Belize, about 1.482 square kilometres located between the Hondo and Belize rivers. British settlers obtained a further concession. By the London Convention of 1786 Spain ceded Belize another 1.883 km square (reaching the Sibun River or Manate Laguna, south of the Belize River).

Then, sometime between 1786 and 1796, the English Baymen from Belize Town cut logwood also in Campeche, near a town of Spanish population. The Spanish Crown ordered that the British settlers of Belize be expelled from that area. There ensued a confrontation between Britain and Spain on the coast of Belize in September 1798. This Battle of St. George's Caye ended with the Spanish defeat. The British were able to continue their harvesting of logwood in Belizean territory, even in areas that remained officially Spanish.

=== 19th and 20th centuries ===
Around the 1840s, thousands of Maya people and mestizos were driven from the area of Bacalar during the Caste War (1847–1901), They settled in the Corozal, Orange Walk Town, and Cayo District, as well as in the city of San Pedro in Ambergris Caye. About 7000 Mexican mestizos immigrated during these years. In the 1870s-1880s, the Kekchi emigrated from Verapaz, Guatemala, where their lands had been seized for coffee plantations and many of them enslaved. They settled villages in the Toledo District, living mainly by maize farming and fishing the streams. The Mopan originated in Belize but most were driven to Guatemala after the British assumed control of Belize in the late 18th century, after the Battle of St. George's Caye. They returned to Belize around 1886, fleeing enslavement and taxation in Petén.

After 1958, Mennonite groups in Mexico emigrated to Belize, settling in the north and west of Belize (Mexican Mennonites may have intermarried with native-born mestizos and Mexican mestizos). Then between 1980 and 1990 thousands of undocumented migrants moved to the central and western parts of the country. Approximately 40,000 Salvadorans (including Salvadoran Mennonites), Guatemalans, Hondurans and Nicaraguans immigrated to Belize in this decade of strife in neighbouring countries. Some 25,000 were from El Salvador and Guatemala. This, along with a high fertility rate, dramatically increased the number of Hispanics in Belize, causing concern over the rapid growth of the Spanish language in a country where the official language is English.

== Demography ==
According to a 2022 survey, 52.1% of the Belizean population is Hispanic: 37% Mestizo and 15% Latin American. According to the 2000 census, Belize has 106,795 Hispanic people. In this figure can be added another 21,848 people who can speak Spanish as second language. In total, there are 128,243 people who speak Spanish in Belize. Although English is the official language, Spanish is spoken by the majority of Belize's population. Also, according to the 2000 census, about 50% of the Belizean population declared themselves Catholics.

Hispanics in Belize are mainly concentrated in the central and western parts of the country. The Yucatec Mestizo best known as Mestizo are mostly found in the North of Belize and on the Northern Cayes, Corozal, Orange Walk, as well as San Pedro town in Ambergris Caye. Both the people of Corozal, as people from Orange Walk, descended from the Yucatec Maya and Mestizo who found refuge in Belizean soil fleeing the Caste War in the 1840s, while most Hispanics from Belize City, Cayo and down South, descends from GCentral American Migrants. The Belize District and the Districts down have Spanish-speaking populations to a lesser extent. In addition, the Mopan indigenous live now in the Cayo district and San Antonio (Toledo district). Some of the Kekchi and Mopan have mixed. However, these groups are not strictly Hispanic because they speak their own Maya dialects, but they do come from Hispanic countries. On the other hand, bilingualism in Spanish is encouraged, as the nation is surrounded by Spanish speaking countries.

According to the 2022 C Population Census, Central American Migrants makeup 15% of the population. the people from Guatemala make up the largest group (42.9%) of the immigrant population in Belize, followed by nationals of El Salvador and Honduras. But according to the data from the 2022 census there has been a decline in people who were born abroad migrating to Belize.

Main Hispanic and Latino immigrants by national origin (2000 Belize Census)
Hispanic Group	Population	% (in relation to the total immigrant community)
(Guatemala) Guatemalan	14,693	42.9
(El Salvador) Salvadoran	6,045	17.6
(Honduras) Honduran	4,961	14.5
(Mexico) Mexican	2,351	6.9
Total	28,050	81.9

== See also ==
- Mexicans in Belize
- History of Roman Catholicism in Belize
- Spanish period of Belize
