= Jaime Awe =

Belizean archaeologist

Jaime José Awe
- Born: San Ignacio, Cayo District, Belize (then British Honduras)
- Education: Trent University (B.A., M.A.); University of London (Ph.D.)
- Occupations: Archaeologist, Professor of Anthropology
- Employer: Northern Arizona University
- Known for: Maya archaeology; Belize Valley Archaeological Reconnaissance Project (BVAR)
- Spouse: Myka Schwanke

Jaime José Awe is a Belizean archaeologist who specializes on the archaeology of the ancient Maya, a professor of Anthropology at Northern Arizona University, and the Director of the Belize Valley Archaeological Reconnaissance Project.

== Early life ==
Awe, the ninth-youngest of eleven children, was born and raised in San Ignacio, Cayo District, Belize (then British Honduras). His childhood home was within walking distance of Maya ruins, where, as a youth, he enjoyed digging up ancient Maya artifacts as a pastime. The courses in Anthropology that he took while a student at St. John's College in Belize City inspired him to pursue a career in archaeology. Due to the limited educational opportunities available to Belizeans at the time, however, he had no choice but to go abroad in order to continue his formal education. Before leaving his Central American homeland to further his education, he held the government post of Archaeological Assistant at the Department of Archaeology (then under the Ministry of Tourism and the Environment) and served as a field assistant in excavations at the Maya archaeological sites of Cerros, Lamanai and the Sayab Mai Cenote.

== Education ==
Awe majored in Anthropology at Trent University in Canada, where he was mentored by Paul Healy and received his B.A. and M.A. in 1981 and 1985, respectively. He began his doctoral studies at the State University of New York at Albany, but later transferred to the University of London, where he became the first Belizean to ever receive a Ph.D. in Archaeology in 1992. Since earning his doctorate, Awe has held faculty positions at Trent University, the University of New Hampshire, Galen University (in Belize) and Northern Arizona University, where he is currently a professor in the Department of Anthropology.

== Government service ==
Awe has held the Belizean Government posts of Archaeological Assistant, Chief Archaeologist and Acting Commissioner of Archaeology at the Department of Archaeology, and Director of the Institute of Archaeology (formerly the Department of Archaeology, and now under the National Institute of Culture and History). Although he resigned the latter post in 2014, he remains Director of the Belize Valley Archaeological Reconnaissance Project (BVAR, which is under the Institute of Archaeology), a position he has held since 1988.

== Fieldwork and publications ==
BVAR includes multi-year excavations at the Maya archaeological sites of Baking Pot, Cahal Pech, Lower Dover and Xunantunich. Awe has also directed the Western Belize Regional Cave Project (WBRCP, 1997–2008), which involved excavations at Actun Tunichil Muknal (ATM) and other Maya cave sites. In addition to his work through BVAR and WBRCP, he has directed excavations at the Maya archaeological sites of Altun Ha, Caracol, Lamanai, Lubaantun and Nim Li Punit. Awe's writings have largely focused on the Maya cities of west-central Belize during the Formative, Preclassic and Classic periods. However, he has published on topics related to the archaeology of Belize in earlier and later periods as well. In all, he has authored and co-authored over fifty academic publications, and appeared in several televised documentaries on archaeology and the ancient Maya.

=== Selected publications ===
- Awe, Jaime J., Claire E. Ebert, W. James Stemp, M. Kathryn Brown, Lauren A. Sullivan, and James F. Garber(2021) Lowland Maya Genesis: The Late Archaic to Late Early Formative Transition in the Upper Belize River Valley. Ancient Mesoamerica 32(3):519-544.
- Awe, Jaime J. (2021) Archaeological Evidence for the Preclassic Origins of the Maya Creation Story and the Resurrection of the Maize God at Cahal Pech, Belize. In, The Myths of the Popol Vuh in Cosmology, Art, and Ritual, edited by Holley Moyes, Allen Christenson and Frauke Sachse, pp. 93–116. University Press of Colorado.
- Awe, Jaime J., Christophe Helmke, Diane Slocum, and Douglas Tilden (2020). Ally, Client or Outpost? Evaluating the Relationship between Xunantunich and Naranjo in the Late Classic Period. Ancient Mesoamerica 31(3): 494–506.
- Awe, Jaime J., Claire Ebert, Julie Hoggarth, Jamies Aimers, Christophe Helmke, John Douglas, and W. James Stemp (2020). The Last Hurrah: Examining the Nature of Peri-Abandonment Deposits and Activities at Cahal Pech, Belize. Ancient Mesoamerica 31:175-187.
- Awe, Jaime J., Julie Hoggarth, and James J. Aimers (2017). Of Apples and Oranges: The Case of E-groups and Eastern Triadic Architectural Assemblages in the Belize River Valley. In Early Maya E-Groups, Solar Calendars, and the Role of Astronomy in the Rise of Lowland Maya Urbanism, pp. 412–449. Edited by David A. Freidel, Arlen F. Chase, Anne Dowd, and Jerry F. Murdock. University Press of Florida, Gainesville, FL.
- Awe, Jaime J. (2008). Architectural Manifestations of Power and Prestige: Examples from Classic Period Monumental Architecture at Cahal Pech, Xunantunich and Caracol, Belize. Research Reports in Belizean Archaeology 5:159-174.
- Awe, Jaime J., Christophe Helmke and Shawn G. Morton (2019). Beyond the Twilight Zone: Cave Exploration in the Macal River Valley, Belize. In, The Realm Below: Speleoarchaeological Investigations in the Macal River Valley, Belize, edited by Christophe Helmke, pp. 20–73. Precolumbian Mesoweb Press, San Francisco.
- Awe, Jaime J., and Christophe G.B. Helmke. (2005). Alive and Kicking in the 3rd to 6th Centuries A.D.: Defining the Early Classic in the Belize River Valley. Research Reports in Belizean Archaeology 2:39-52.
- Awe, Jaime J., and Christophe G.B. Helmke. (2015). The Sword and the Olive Jar: Material Evidence of Seventeenth-Century Maya-European Interaction in Central Belize. Ethnohistory 62(2):333-360.
- Awe, Jaime J., Julie A. Hoggarth, and Christophe G.B. Helmke. (2014). Prehistoric Settlement Patterns in the Upper Belize River Valley and Their Implications for Models of Low-Density Urbanism. Acta Mesoamericana 27:263-285.
- Awe, Jaime J., and Jon C. Lohse. (2007). In Search of the First Belizeans: The Paleo-Indian and Archaic Hunter-Gatherers of Belize. Belizean Studies 29(2):29-49.
- Awe, Jaime J. (2008). Architectural Manifestations of Power and Prestige: Examples from Classic Period Monumental Architecture at Cahal Pech, Xunantunich and Caracol, Belize. Research Reports in Belizean Archaeology 5:159-174.
- Awe, Jaime J., and Christophe G.B. Helmke. (2005). Alive and Kicking in the 3rd to 6th Centuries A.D.: Defining the Early Classic in the Belize River Valley. Research Reports in Belizean Archaeology 2:39-52.
- Awe, Jaime J., and Christophe G.B. Helmke. (2015). The Sword and the Olive Jar: Material Evidence of Seventeenth-Century Maya-European Interaction in Central Belize. Ethnohistory 62(2):333-360.
- Awe, Jaime J., Julie A. Hoggarth, and Christophe G.B. Helmke. (2014). Prehistoric Settlement Patterns in the Upper Belize River Valley and Their Implications for Models of Low-Density Urbanism. Acta Mesoamericana 27:263-285.

== Miscellaneous ==
In 2012, while still Director of the Institute of Archaeology, Awe threatened to sue Disney, Lucasfilm, Paramount Pictures and others, on behalf of the nation of Belize. At the center of this was the Mitchell-Hedges Skull, which was supposedly recovered from the Maya archaeological site of Lubaantun in the 1920s, and which allegedly inspired a prop that was central to the 2008 motion picture Indiana Jones and the Kingdom of the Crystal Skull. The suit demanded that the Mitchell-Hedges Skull be returned to Belize, and that the nation receive a share of the film's profits. The suit was dismissed as "frivolous" and the authenticity of the skull determined to be 1930s Europe (made with a diamond-tipped drill).

Awe is married to fellow Maya archaeologist and BVAR staff member Myka Schwanke. He is fluent in English, Spanish and Belizean Creole.
