= Esperanza, Belize =

Esperanza
- Location within Belize
- Coordinates: 17.1785°N 89.0409°W
- Country: Belize
- District: Cayo District
- Constituency: Cayo North East

Population (2010)
  - Total: 1,262
- Time zone: UTC-6 (Central)

Esperanza is a village located along the George Price Highway in Cayo District, Belize. It lies approximately four kilometers northeast of San Ignacio. According to the 2010 census, Esperanza has a population of 1,262 people in 286 households.

== Geography ==
The town is located on the George Price Highway (Western Highway) east of San Ignacio/Santa Elena on the way to Central Farm and Georgeville to the east. Red Creek flows into the Belize River northwest of the town.
