= Cayo North East =

Electoral constituency in Belize

- Constituency for the Belize House of Representatives
- District: Cayo
- Electorate: 5,953 (2015)
- Major settlements: San Ignacio (part), Spanish Lookout

Current constituency
- Created: 2008
- Party: People's United Party
- Area Representative: Orlando Habet

Cayo North East is an electoral constituency in the Cayo District represented in the House of Representatives of the National Assembly of Belize since 2015 by Orlando Habet of the People's United Party.

== Profile ==
Cayo North East includes the northern part of San Ignacio, as well as the villages of Santa Familia, Spanish Lookout, Billy White, Esperanza, Duck Run I, Duck Run II, and Duck Run III.

Along with Belmopan, the Cayo North East constituency was created for the 2008 general election. In June 2014 San Ignacio mayor John August was named the UDP candidate for the 2015 general election, replacing embattled Area Representative Elvin Penner, who was re-elected in 2012 by a razor-thin margin and faced a recall drive shortly thereafter. The PUP nominated Orlando Habet, who went on to win the election in November.

== Area representatives ==
Election	Area representative	Party
2008	Elvin Penner	UDP
2012	Elvin Penner	UDP
2015	Orlando Habet	PUP
2020	Orlando Habet	PUP
2025	Orlando Habet	PUP

== Elections ==
Election	Political result	Candidate	Party	Votes	%	±%
2025 general election Electorate: 6,578; Turnout: 4,137 (62.89%) −20.60	PUP hold Majority: 1,554 (37.57%) +7.62	Orlando Habet	PUP	2,813	68.00	+2.65
2025 general election Electorate: 6,578; Turnout: 4,137 (62.89%) −20.60	PUP hold Majority: 1,554 (37.57%) +7.62	Albert Joseph Fernandez	UDP	1,259	30.43	−4.97
2020 general election Electorate: 5,706; Turnout: 4,764 (83.49%) +9.51	PUP hold Majority: 1,322 (29.95%) +28.32	Orlando Habet	PUP	2,996	65.35	+15.01
2020 general election Electorate: 5,706; Turnout: 4,764 (83.49%) +9.51	PUP hold Majority: 1,322 (29.95%) +28.32	John August Jr.	UDP	1,674	35.40	−13.31
2020 general election Electorate: 5,706; Turnout: 4,764 (83.49%) +9.51	PUP hold Majority: 1,322 (29.95%) +28.32	Nefretery Martin	Belize People's Front	59	1.25	-
2015 general election Electorate: 5,953; Turnout: 4,404 (73.98%) −0.32	PUP gain from UDP; Majority: 72 (1.63%) +1.21	Orlando Habet	PUP	2,217	50.34	+0.58
2015 general election Electorate: 5,953; Turnout: 4,404 (73.98%) −0.32	PUP gain from UDP; Majority: 72 (1.63%) +1.21	John August Jr.	UDP	2,145	48.71	−0.63
2012 general election Electorate: 5,548; Turnout: 4,122 (74.3%) −3.36	UDP hold Majority: 17 (0.42%) −12.0	Elvin Penner	UDP	2,051	49.76	−3.88
2012 general election Electorate: 5,548; Turnout: 4,122 (74.3%) −3.36	UDP hold Majority: 17 (0.42%) −12.0	Orlando Habet	PUP	2,034	49.34	+8.12
2008 general election Electorate: 4,683; Turnout: 3,637 (77.66%) n/a	UDP win Majority: 452 (12.42%) n/a	Elvin Penner	UDP	1,951	53.64	-
2008 general election Electorate: 4,683; Turnout: 3,637 (77.66%) n/a	UDP win Majority: 452 (12.42%) n/a	Orlando Habet	PUP	1,499	41.22	-
2008 general election Electorate: 4,683; Turnout: 3,637 (77.66%) n/a	UDP win Majority: 452 (12.42%) n/a	Cornelius Dueck	NRP	152	4.18	-
