= La Ruta Maya =

Canoe race

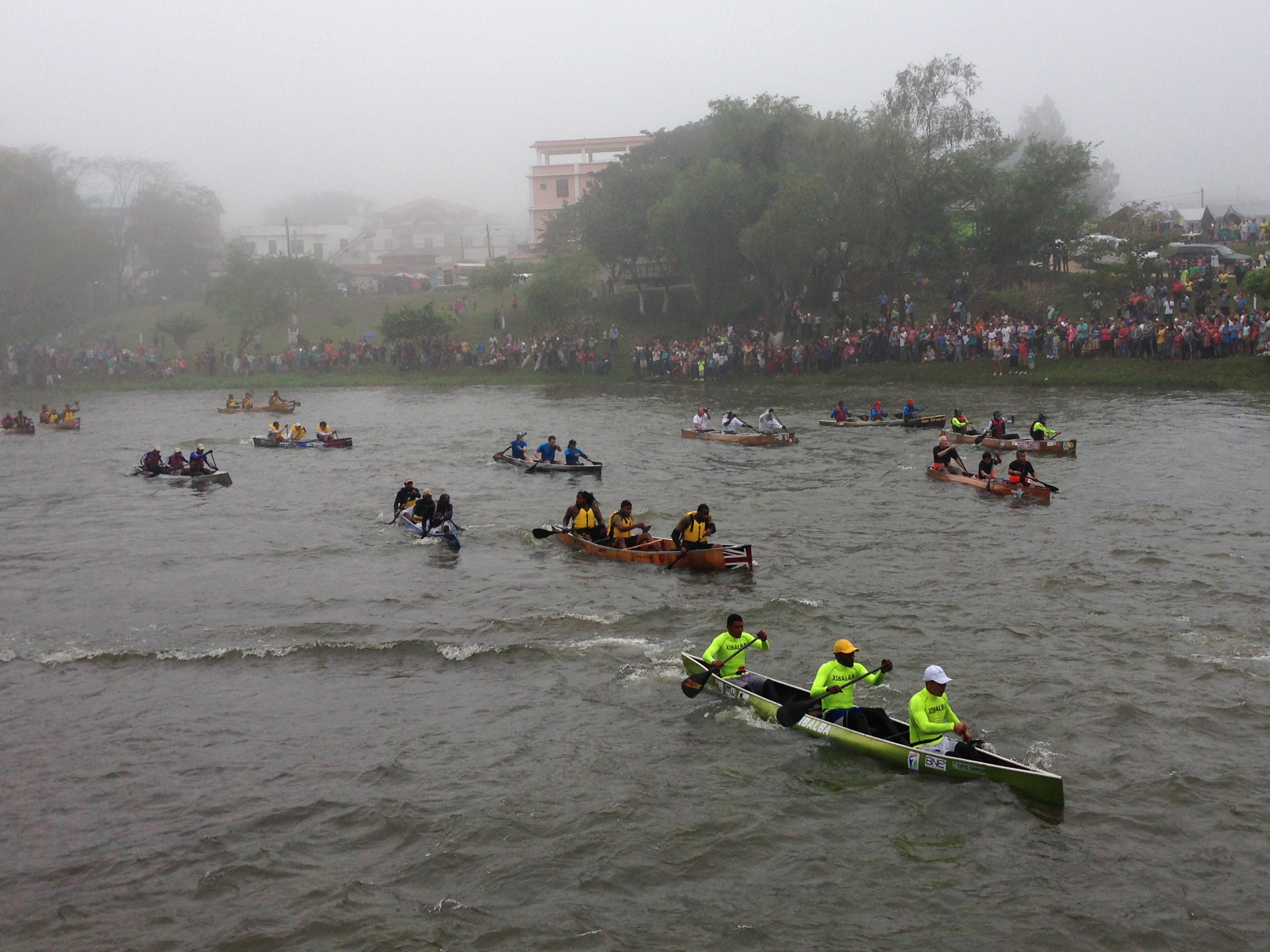
Competitors at the 2016 La Ruta Maya

The Belikin La Ruta Maya Belize River Challenge is an annual 4-day canoe marathon held in Belize. It is considered the biggest sporting event in the country, and typically attracts thousands of spectators. The course runs from the Hawkesworth Bridge in San Ignacio to the Belcan Bridge in Belize City, a distance of 180 miles (290 km). It is held each year in March and is scheduled to coincide with the weekend of Baron Bliss Day.

== History ==
The event was first proposed by Richard Harrison, a Belizean investor, as a way to promote a new brand of bottled water. Harrison put together a committee to organize the event and found additional sponsors for services and prizes. Although the original purpose of the race was commercial, Harrison also saw it as an opportunity to raise awareness about the environment and the history and culture of the Belize River. The first race included 31 teams and was won by the Hobb brothers from Bullet Tree Falls. About 50 teams now compete each year.

== Results ==
Year	Winning team	Total time	References
1998	Snooty Fox	20:50:58	
1999	Cheers	22:01:15	
2000	Black Rock	22:31:56	
2001	Koop Sheet Metal	20:13:56	
2002	Koop Sheet Metal	18:17:37	
2003	The H Team	19:15:23	
2004	Quality Poultry	18:25:17	
2005	Com Get Mi (Big H)	19:19:10	
2006	Belize Bank	17:50:23	
2007	Belize Bank	17:55:34	
2008	CPBL Caribbean Pride	17:22:33	
2009	Belize Bank – Tek it Back	17:54:05	
2010	Ziprider	18:41:07	
2011	Ziprider	18:00:04	
2012	Belize Bank Bulldogs	16:36:03	
2013	Belize Bank Bulldogs	18:31:21	
2014	Belize Bank Bulldogs	17:25:13	
2015	BTL Cobb's Arm	17:35:27	
2016	Koop Sheet Metal	17:08:46	
2017	NICH	17:50:40	
2018	Koop Sheet Metal	17:08:50	
2019	NICH	18:22:11	
2020	CORE	18:10:19	
2021	NO RACE		
2022	Team PACT	18:14:39	
2023	Slim & Trim Like Guava Limb	18:18:36	
2024	Slim & Trim Like Guava Limb	18:24:22	
2025	Slim & Trim Like Guava Limb	18:09:22	
2026	PACT on Trak	17:45:34	
