= Rene Montero =

Belizean politician

Member of the Belize House of Representatives for Cayo Central
- Incumbent
- Assumed office 7 February 2008
- Preceded by: Mario Castellanos

Personal details
- Born: San Ignacio
- Party: United Democratic Party

Rene Jaime Montero is a Belizean politician who represents the Cayo Central constituency in the Belize House of Representatives. He was the Minister of Agriculture, Fisheries, and Cooperatives in Belize from 2008 to 2012. Currently, he holds office as the Minister of Works and Transport.

In 2013, Montero was appointed chair of the newly formed Belize Infrastructure Limited, a corporation set up by the government to execute a BZ$60 million sports infrastructure project.

He holds a degree from Michigan State University and lives in San Ignacio, Cayo District.
