= Cuello =

Archaeological site in Belize

Coordinates: 18°04′N 88°36′W

- Interactive map of Cuello
- Location: Orange Walk District, Belize
- Region: Orange Walk District

History
- Built: Possibility between 2600 BC to 1200 BC (Middle Preclassic)

Site notes
- Architectural style: Preclassic Maya
- Archaeologists: Norman Hammond

Cuello is a Maya archaeological site in northern Belize. The site is that of a farming village with a long occupational history. It was originally dated to 2000 BC, but these dates have now been corrected and updated to around 1200 BC. Its inhabitants lived in pole-and-thatch houses that were built on top of low plaster-coated platforms. The site contains residential groups clustered around central patios. It also features the remains of a steam bath dating to approximately 900 BC, making it the oldest steam bath found to date in the Maya lowlands. Human burials have been associated with the residential structures; the oldest have no surviving burial relics, but from 900 BC onwards, they were accompanied by offerings of ceramic vessels.

According to some sources, ceramics from the earliest phase of the settlement at Cuello already belonged to an established lowland Maya pottery tradition. Other scholars disagree, and consider that the earliest Cuello pottery was of the Swasey type, starting at 1200 BC, with a lack of clear parallels.

Although Cuello appears to have been a typical, relatively unimportant rural village in the Preclassic era, it participated in regional trade networks with obsidian being imported from the Maya highlands from 800 BC onwards, and a small amount of jade arriving in the community a few centuries later.

== Location ==
Cuello is located two miles Yo Creek Road in the Orange Walk District. It sits on the private land of the Cuello Family but permissions are granted to visit the site.

== Archaeology ==
Uncorrected radiocarbon dates from the lowest stratigraphic levels of the site returned dates as far back as 2600 BC, although these were viewed as controversial.

The site was investigated in the 1970s and 1980s by archaeologist Norman Hammond. Structure 326 was excavated in 1980 and measures 8 by 4 metres (26 by 13 ft). The walls of the building were made of thin poles tied together with vines. This was then coated in a smoothed layer of clay and finished with a white lime wash.

Archaeological investigation has revealed that the diet of the Preclassic occupants of Cuello consisted of less than 30% maize, compared with up to 75% for the modern Maya. White-tailed deer made up over half the meat in their diet, followed by freshwater turtles and domestic dogs, the last of which represents 7% of the animal remains found at the site.

=== Burials ===
Two Late Preclassic mass burial areas have been uncovered at Cuello, one of which contained 26 or more males who had been sacrificed. Healed fractures on the bones suggest that they may have been captured warriors. Further evidence of local warfare comes from evidence of burnt buildings at the site.

A number of elite burials have been excavated at Cuello. The earliest phases of the Middle Classic included both adults and children accompanied by offerings of jade and shell ornaments, indicating social differentiation. High-status burials tended to be associated with specific locations throughout the history of the site.

Burial 160 is an elite burial that has been dated to 500–400 BC. It consists of an individual interred in a cist, accompanied by two ceramic vessels and ornaments that included tubes fashioned from deer bones and engraved with a mat design that in later times became associated with royalty. There was also the upper portion of a human skull that had been fashioned into a plaque. Due to these distinguishing features of the burial, the excavators concluded that it was that of a Middle Classic ruler of the settlement. The site of this burial remained important in later times, with the residential patio being converted into a ceremonial platform upon which was built a small pyramid temple.

== Ceramic chronology ==
The earliest pottery found in Belize is in the western part of the country, in places like Cahal Pech and Blackman Eddy. At the northern sites, the pottery is now believed to have come somewhat later. The earliest Cuello pottery found is of the Swasey type, starting at about 1200 BC. While the known Xe ceramics of the Pasion River drainage date from the similar time period, there are significant differences between these and the Swasey/Bladen ceramics.

== See also ==
- Colha, Belize
