= More Tomorrow =

More Tomorrow may refer to:

- More Tomorrow, Belize, a village in Cayo District, Belize
- "More Tomorrow", an award-winning short story by Michael Marshall Smith
- More Tomorrow & Other Stories, a collection of short stories by Michael Marshall Smith
