= Five Blues Lake National Park =

National Park in Belize

Coordinates: 17.135°N 88.580°W

Location of Five Blues Lake, (middle right).

Five Blues Lake National Park is a 10-acre parcel of tropical forest in Belize, which is enclosed by over 4,000 acres of limestone hills. The lake obtained its name from the different shades of blue it reflects from the different water depths and the reflection of sunlight through the trees that frame the lake. The lake is maintained by an Association of Friends living in the Village of St. Margret's, a few minutes from the lakeside. Beside the lake is a shoreline of sunken limestone at the edge of the lake which leads to Orchid Island, where an abundance of wild orchids grows. In 2007, a drought was thought to have condemned the lake; studies were conducted to determine the cause.

== History ==
Five Blues Lake was established as a national park in April 1991. Since the boundaries were not clearly defined, it was enlarged in April 1994, to approximately 1640 hectares, (4,000 acres). Prior to the declaration the area was mainly exploited by people for fishing, hunting, and farming. Thereafter, the site was managed by a local Non-governmental Organization (NGO), called the Association of Friends of Five Blues Lake. The lake is believed to have formed because of a blockage of an underground waterway, which is a normal feature in karstic landscape. Various small streams also contributed to the creation of the lake.

== Fauna ==
167 species of birds and over 20 species of bats have been identified in the park. The five wild cats of Belize (jaguar, jaguarundi, margay, mountain lion and ocelot) are said to reside within the park, which is also home to howler monkeys, tapirs, pacas (gibnut), peccaries and armadillos. Studies have not been done on the aquatic life that exists in the lake; however, two species of fish have been found, bay snook and tuba.

St Margaret's Village

Five Blues lake is surrounded by deciduous forest and lime-living vegetation. Selective logging, chicle and rubber tapping, fruit gathering and other extractive uses, ancient Mayan silvicultural practices, and clearing for various types of agriculture have had considerable effects on the forest over time, but today the park is sustainably managed by the local community.

== Physical features and climate ==
The lake is found in a karstic area with alluvial spots. The park also contains caves, sinkholes and exposed rock faces. The parcel contains calcareous soil, mainly shallow and stony, some drained clay areas, and riverine alluvium in the valleys, but most soil is limestone in origin. Steep hills surround the 7.4 acres (3.0 hectares) lake with seasonal swamp. The lake appears to be fed by small underground creeks. It has a small island with an abundance of orchids. Five Blues hydrological structure is similar to that of Blue Hole National Park. The lake collects approximately 104 inches (260 cm) of rainfall annually. Its elevation is between 50 and 1,180 feet (15 and 360 m) above sea level. The park has water which flows over, under and through it which feeds into the Sibun River.

== Drainage of lake ==
Unfortunately in 2006, the lake experienced a drought. Survey conducted determined that heavy rainfall in June and July 2006 led to flooding, which removed sediment fill or organic material in the caves. The average monthly rainfall at Hummingbird Villages totaled 432 millimetres (17.0 in) in June and 672 millimetres (26.5 in) in July 2006. The rapid drainage of the lake still remains uncertain. It is believed that it may have resulted from failure of a plug in the lake bed cenote that eased near-vertical discharge into underlying cave channels. Although prior reports of rapid drainage of cenote did not exist, heavy rainfall may have increased pressure in the lake, but there is no evidence of a lake-bottom plug either prior to drainage or as a result of sediment erosion before refilling, and the reported depth of the cenote, which puts it well below sea level, suggests that vertical drainage is unlikely. Another cause could be that of an unblocking incident downstream, which led the water to drain out. This explanation is said to be more probable. Meerman reported that local residents had previously noted sudden fluctuations in the lake and that turbidity appeared to have become less seasonally predictable, perhaps presaging later developments. Furthermore, local residents reported that after the drainage of the lake there was a new, smaller lake in another part of the park which could point to an underground connection.

== Local population ==
St. Margaret's (Santa Martha) Village is located on Hummingbird Highway and Lagoon Road at Mile 32. The name St. Margaret's is now used to refer specifically to an area of government sub-divided land near Mile 32 that was set up about 5 years ago to accommodate a flood of Spanish-speaking immigrants. The village has mostly unsurveyed land, referred to as the older area of settlement. The village is said to be the refuge of many immigrants in the early 1980s. In 1980, the village had a population of 60 residents, in 1991 it increased to 415 and later to 600-700 people.
