= The Lodge at Chaa Creek =

Eco-resort and private nature reserve in the Cayo District of Belize

Coordinates: 17.10829°N 89.07348°W

The Lodge at Chaa Creek is an eco-resort and 500-acre private nature reserve located in the Cayo District of Belize, Central America. Established as a small family farm in 1981, it has grown to be one of Belize’s most recognized resorts. It has also received international recognition as a model for sustainable tourism and responsible travel by Conde Nast, National Geographic Adventure, Travel and Leisure magazines, and other publications and organizations. Chaa Creek runs educational and natural history programs with a focus on Belize's Maya culture and civilization.

== Early history and development ==
In the late 1970s, Mick and Lucy Fleming decided to settle in Belize and purchased an abandoned citrus farm along the Macal River in the Cayo District. At that time, the property had no road access, and travel to the nearest town, San Ignacio, was conducted by river using a dugout canoe. The Flemings sustained themselves by transporting produce such as vegetables, milk, eggs, cheese, and yogurt to the San Ignacio markets.

In 1981, Chaa Creek Cottages was founded as the inaugural jungle lodge in Belize, featuring two thatched-roof cottages constructed from local materials. The establishment expanded with a road built by the British Army Corps of Engineers in 1983, allowing for the addition of a dining room alongside the existing six cottages. Further constructions, including more cottages, a gift shop, a water tower, and staff quarters, followed in 1985. By 1988, the lodge encompassed 16 cottage rooms, which benefited from amenities like electricity-generated ice and hot water. Enhancements were made to improve accessibility for activities such as canoeing, and in 1990, all cottages were upgraded. The expansion also led to the creation of trails for activities like horseback riding, mountain biking, and trekking.

In the 1990s, Chaa Creek saw notable growth with staff expansion and improved infrastructure. The establishment of the Chaa Creek Natural History Centre and Blue Morpho Butterfly Breeding Centre aimed to raise environmental awareness, facilitate scientific research, and showcase findings and artifacts to the public and students.

By 1997, the property had expanded to include 21 cottages, including luxury suites. The following year, electric lighting and fans were added to the rooms. In 1999, the Macal River Camp underwent renovations, introducing bungalow-style casitas and a central dining area. In 2003, Chaa Creek acquired the neighboring Ixchel Medicine Trail (now known as the Maya Medicinal Plant Trail), dedicated to traditional Maya healing practices and medicinal plants. The Maya Organic Farm was also established to showcase traditional agricultural methods and provide fresh produce for the resort. The presence of Maya archaeological sites and temples on the property contributes to visitors' understanding of Maya history in Belize. Currently, Chaa Creek offers 28 cottages, suites, and villas and employs over 150 staff members.

== Ecological awareness and sustainable development ==
The Flemings were dedicated to sustainable development and operated Chaa Creek as an eco-resort before the term became widely known. They engaged with traditional and modern practices like permaculture, solar power, and waste recycling, while also studying local farming methods.

As the resort grew, the Flemings acquired adjacent land to establish a private nature reserve, focusing on conserving local flora and fauna in western Belize. They emphasized sustainable development, including practices like glass bottle recycling for construction, solar power, recycling, and organic farming to supply the Lodge.

Chaa Creek has been involved in several environmental initiatives and investigations. These include collaborations with organizations such as RiverKeepers, the Yerkes Primate Institute, the Foundation for Wildlife Conservation, the New York Botanical Gardens, and the Zoological Society of Milwaukee County's Birds Without Borders. The resort has also participated in projects like the Belize Foundation for Conservation and the Bay Palm Reforestation initiative.

== Focus on the Maya ==
The Chaa Creek area has a rich Maya history spanning over 2500 years, characterized by habitation and trade. Notable Maya sites like Cahal Pech and the Temple of Xunantunich are in proximity, while the 365-acre nature reserve boasts over 70 recorded Maya sites. Farming and development activities led to the discovery of artifacts and structures, sparking an interest in local Maya culture. This prompted collaborations with institutions such as the University of California and researchers like Dr. Jaime Awe from the Belize Ministry of Archaeology for ongoing archaeology research.

During the winter solstice of 2012, which marked the conclusion of the Maya Long Count and held cultural importance, Chaa Creek sponsored a series of scholarly seminars, lectures, workshops, and cultural events. These endeavors were aimed at fostering credible Maya research and clarifying misconceptions about the significance of that particular year in Maya interpretations.

== Environmental education ==
The Chaa Creek Natural History Centre and Nature Reserve also functions as an educational destination, accommodating field trips for various local and international educational institutions annually.

The Environmental Education Outreach is an educational program in Belize focused on environmental awareness. Chaa Creek collaborates with the State University of New York for a Summer Teachers Institute in Environmental Studies and Culture, aiming to promote sustainable resource use and cultural heritage understanding. The Bush Medicine Camp, in partnership with Ixchel Tropical Research Foundation, focuses on Belize's Maya medicinal plants and traditional uses.

Chaa Creek offers work experience and research opportunities for both local and international student interns.
