= List of mayors of San Ignacio, Belize =

The following is a list of the mayors of San Ignacio, Belize:

Mayor	Term
Hamid Musa	1958–1960
Hector Silva	1961–1963
Santiago Perdomo	1964–1965
Domingo T. Espat	1966–1968
Armando Sabido	1969
Eduardo V. Luna	1970–1971
Gabriel Roches	1972
Francisco Bautista	1972
Joseph Andrews	1973–1974
Teodocio Ochoa	1975
Armando Sabido	1976–1978
Joseph Andrews	1979–1980
Alberto Montero	1980
Domingo Cruz Sr.	1981–1983
Rene Moreno	1984
Eulogio Cano	1985–1987
Domingo Cruz Jr.	1988–1989
Victor August	1990
Salvador Fernandez	1991
Eulogio Cano	1992
Alvaro Palencia	1993–1994
Luis Manzanero	?
Victor August	1995
Martin Galvez	?
Marconi Matus	?
Albert Bradley	1997-2000
Desmond Berry	1999?
Orlando Habet	2000–2002
Alfonso Cruz Jr.	2003–2005
John August Jr.	2006–2014
Earl Trapp	2015–
