= Sacred Heart College, Cayo =

Coordinates: 17.16107°N 89.07410°W

Sacred Heart College
- Motto: Nostrea cor Jesu Fons Sapientiae
- Motto in English: Our Sacred Heart of Jesus, Source of All Our Wisdom
- Established: 1960
- Religious affiliation: Roman Catholic
- Location: San Ignacio
- Colours: Red and Gold
- Website: shc.edu.bz

Sacred Heart College is a Belizean High School and Junior College operating in the capital of the Cayo District, San Ignacio. It is one of Belize's premier institutions and is Belize's second-oldest, as well as its highest excelling high school. It is a Catholic, co-educational institution, founded in 1960. The College serves the communities of San Ignacio, Santa Elena, Benque Viejo Del Carmen and surrounding villages.

The motto for Sacred Heart is Nostrea cor Jesu Fons Sapientiae which is Latin for Our Sacred Heart of Jesus, source of all our wisdom.
