= Chaa Creek =

Tributary of the Macal River in western Belize

Chaa Creek is a tributary of the Macal River in the Cayo District in western Belize. It is near the site of an ancient Maya settlement. One of the official gauging stations of the Macal is located near the confluence with Chaa Creek.

== Maya archaeological site ==
Xunantunich was a Maya settlement or city in the Belize River valley in the Late and Terminal Classic periods (c. 700–900 AD). At its peak, the region had a population of nearly 200,000.

There are Maya ruins of a community in the Chaa Creek catchment basin 6 kilometres (3.7 mi) east of Xunantunich's center that remain largely unexcavated. Initial investigation and surveying of the site was done from 1992 to 1994 under the auspices of the Xunantunich Archaelogical Project.

Excavations were conducted in 1995 and 1997. Significant pottery finds and other artifacts have been recovered at the site, which is posited to be a satellite site of Xunantunich.

Sixty-two sites were identified within the 2-square-kilometre (0.77 sq mi) settlement zone, the three largest being Stela group, Plantain group and Tunchilen group. Each of these three had "stelae, immense plazas, and 5-m-high [16-ft-tall] temple mounds" and were each situated on its own ridge. The Stela group features an "immense platform", an entrance ramp at the eastern end, two temple-pyramids facing each other (the larger one on the east containing the burial crypts of two men), two collapsed stelae (apparently associated with ancestor veneration), and a stone monument at the top of the ramp. The Tunchilen group, from the same era as the Stela group, consists of a "large, open plaza flanked by a massive, 50-metre (160 ft) long winged structure". The Plaintain group, dating to a different era, has a ramp to its platform facing toward Xunantunich, a building on the east side with a "corbel vaulted roof" and stucco molding, a small altar, and a crypt beneath the altar.

The ruins are contained within the privately held Chaa Creek Nature Reserve.

== Flora and fauna ==
The Chaa Creek Nature Reserve is also a noted area for birdwatching. Over 300 species of birds have been sighted there.

== Geology ==
The underlying geology of this watershed can be characterised as limestone associations of foothills of the Maya Mountains.

== See also ==
- Cahal Pech - another Maya site in the vicinity
- The Lodge at Chaa Creek - an eco-resort and 365 acre private nature reserve located in the Cayo District of Belize, Central America.
