= Elvin Penner =

Belizean politician

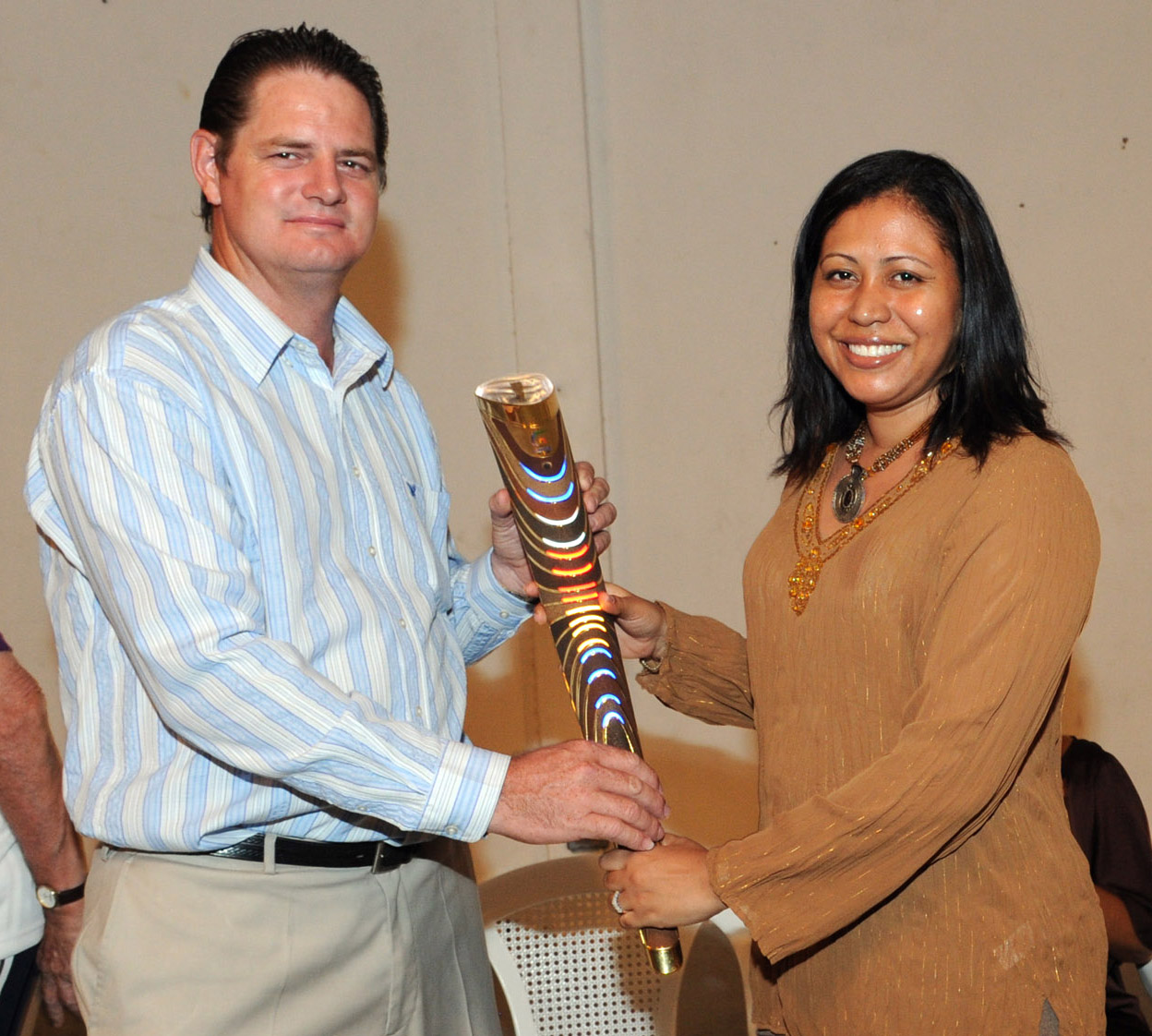
- The Minister of Sports, Mr. Elvin Penner receiving the Queen's Baton 2010 from the Mayor of Belize, Ms. Zenida Moya Flowers on its arrival at the House of Culture, at Belize on April 08, 2010

Member of the Belize House of Representatives for Cayo North East
- In office 7 February 2008 – 4 November 2015
- Preceded by: (constituency created)
- Succeeded by: Orlando Habet

Personal details
- Party: United Democratic Party

Elvin Penner is a Belizean politician who served in the House of Representatives from 2008 to 2015 representing the Cayo North East constituency. He is a member of the United Democratic Party. Penner was the first Belizean Mennonite elected to national office.

Penner was initially appointed as Minister of Natural Resources and the Environment in 2008. Following a cabinet reshuffling in March 2009, Penner transitioned to the Ministry of Public Utilities, Information and Broadcasting. After being re-elected in 2012, Penner was appointed Minister of State in the Ministry of National Security (with responsibility for immigration and border protection).

== Passport scandal ==
On 19 September 2013, Penner was stripped of his ministerial portfolios by Prime Minister Dean Barrow due to his involvement in allegedly selling and issuing a fraudulent Belizean passport to South Korean national Kim Won Hong, who at the time was jailed in Taiwan. Penner was charged with illegally facilitating a passport in March 2014, but charges were dropped in July due to lack of evidence.

After the scandal Penner was shunned in the Belize House and reportedly did not carry out any official government duties. He resisted calls to resign from both the Belize House and the UDP by Barrow and others.

In 2013 Penner was the subject of a recall petition in his constituency. However the petition was declared invalid in January 2014. In June 2014 Penner was deselected as the UDP's candidate in Cayo North East in the 2015 general election in favour of former San Ignacio Mayor John August. At that election August was defeated by the People's United Party candidate, Orlando Habet.

== Personal ==
Penner is of Canadian ancestry. He has 10 children, eight daughters and two sons.
