= San Antonio, Cayo =

San Antonio
- Location within Belize
- Coordinates: 17°6′N 88°58′W
- Country: Belize
- District: Cayo District
- Constituency: Cayo Central

Population (2000)
  - Total: 2,124
- Time zone: UTC-6 (Central)

San Antonio is a village in the Cayo District of Belize. In 2000, the village of San Antonio had a population of 2,124 people. Its population is predominantly Yukatek-speaking Maya.
