= Santa Familia =

- Location within Belize
- Coordinates: 17.185°N 89.074°W
- Country: Belize
- District: Cayo District
- Constituency: Cayo North East
- Elevation: 64 m (210 ft)

Population (2010)
  - Total: 1,598
- Time zone: UTC-6 (Central)

Santa Familia is a village located along the Belize River in Cayo District, Belize. According to the 2010 census, Santa Familia has a population of 1,598 people in 321 households.
