= Lower Dover =

Maya archaeological site in the Belize River Valley

- Periods: Middle Preclassic to Early Postclassic occupation
- Cultures: Maya
- Location: Spanish Lookout, Cayo District, Belize
- Region: Cayo District

Site notes
- Excavation dates: 2010-2015
- Archaeologists: Jaime Awe, Belize Valley Archaeological Reconnaissance Project
- Responsible body: Institute of Archaeology, National Institute of Culture and History (Belize)

Lower Dover is a Maya archaeological site in the Belize River Valley. It is located on the grounds of the Lower Dover Field Station & Jungle Lodge, in Unitedville, Cayo District, Belize. The site is bordered by the Belize River to the north, Upper Barton Creek to the west, Lower Barton Creek to the east, and the Western Highway to the south. Lower Dover is one of several Maya archaeological sites in the area; it is across the Belize River from (and south of) Barton Ramie, 3 kilometers west of Blackman Eddy, and 6 kilometers east of Baking Pot.

== History ==
The site of Lower Dover consists of a civic ceremonial center that was occupied in the latter part of the Late Classic, abandoned during the Terminal Classic, and partially reoccupied in the Early Postclassic; and a settlement area to the south that was occupied as early as the Middle Preclassic. Based on its location and the similarity of its architecture to that of the better-understood Maya archaeological site of Cahal Pech, it has been speculated that Lower Dover's civic ceremonial center was an administrative seat for both the Lower Dover and Barton Ramie settlement areas, and a replacement in that role for Blackman Eddy, which was abandoned in the Late Classic. However, nothing is known for certain about the political status of Lower Dover, or about its relation to other sites. Much of the site remains unexcavated, and no dated or inscribed monuments have been discovered.

== Excavations ==
The site of Lower Dover was discovered by William and Madeline Reynolds, owners of the land and proprietors of the Lower Dover Field Station & Jungle Lodge, and brought to the attention of the Institute of Archaeology, National Institute of Culture and History (Belize), in 2009. The civic ceremonial center was first surveyed in 2009, and excavations have taken place there every year since 2010. The southern settlement area was first surveyed in 2013, and excavations have taken place there every year since 2014. All archaeological work at the site has been under the aegis of the Belize Valley Archaeological Reconnaissance Project (BVAR) and the direction of Dr. Jaime Awe, and excavations have been conducted by Rafael Guerra every year since 2011. In 2013, the entire site was surveyed via LiDAR ground-penetrating radar, as part of the West-Central Belize LiDAR Survey.

== Ceramics ==
Pottery types that have been identified at Lower Dover include Ahk’utu Molded-Carved, Alexander's Unslipped, Augustine Red, Belize Red, Cayo Unslipped, Daylight Orange, Dos Arroyos Orange-Polychrome, Garbutt Creek Red, Miseria Appliqued, Mountain Pine Red, Paxcaman Red, Pedregal Modeled, Platon Punctated, Roaring Creek, Savanna Orange, and Tutu Camp Striated.
