= Cayo Central =

Electoral constituency in Belize

- Constituency for the Belize House of Representatives
- District: Cayo
- Electorate: 7,180 (2012)
- Major settlements: Santa Elena

Current constituency
- Created: 1984
- Party: People's United Party
- Area Representative: Alex Balona

Cayo Central is an electoral constituency in the Cayo District represented in the House of Representatives of the National Assembly of Belize since 2020 by Alex Balona of the People's United Party (PUP).

== Profile ==
The Cayo Central constituency was one of 10 new seats created for the 1984 general election. Cayo Central consists of an area in north-central Cayo District including Georgeville and the Santa Elena section of western San Ignacio.

Cayo Central is a bellwether constituency in Belize. Since its creation the party which won the constituency went on to win the general election overall.

== Area representatives ==
Election	Area representative	Party
1984	Eduardo Juan	UDP
1989	Dan Silva	PUP
1993	Eduardo Juan	UDP
1998	Dan Silva	PUP
2003	Mario Castellanos	PUP
2008	Rene Montero	UDP
2012	Rene Montero	UDP
2015	Rene Montero	UDP
2020	Alex Balona	PUP
2025	Alex Balona	PUP

== Elections ==
Election	Political result	Candidate	Party	Votes	%	±%
2025 general election Electorate: 8,761; Turnout: 5,514 (62.94%) −13.77	PUP hold Majority: 721 (13.08%) +1.10	Alex Balona	PUP	3,031	54.97	−1.02
2025 general election Electorate: 8,761; Turnout: 5,514 (62.94%) −13.77	PUP hold Majority: 721 (13.08%) +1.10	Mark Roland O’Brien	UDP	2,310	41.89	-2.12
2025 general election Electorate: 8,761; Turnout: 5,514 (62.94%) −13.77	PUP hold Majority: 721 (13.08%) +1.10	Roddy Lewinskey Wade	Belizeans Justice Movement	29	0.53	-
2025 general election Electorate: 8,761; Turnout: 5,514 (62.94%) −13.77	PUP hold Majority: 721 (13.08%) +1.10	Francisco Concepcion Escobar	General Opportunity Development Party	26	0.47	-
2020 general election Electorate: 8,107; Turnout: 6,219 (76.71%) +1.76	PUP gain from UDP; Majority: 735 (11.98%) +8.62	Alex Balona	PUP	3,434	55.99	+8.16
2020 general election Electorate: 8,107; Turnout: 6,219 (76.71%) +1.76	PUP gain from UDP; Majority: 735 (11.98%) +8.62	Rene Montero	UDP	2,699	44.01	-7.18
2015 general election Electorate: 8,468; Turnout: 6,348 (74.95%) +4.31	UDP hold Majority: 213 (3.36%) +2.50	Rene Montero	UDP	3,249	51.19	+1.47
2015 general election Electorate: 8,468; Turnout: 6,348 (74.95%) +4.31	UDP hold Majority: 213 (3.36%) +2.50	Daniel Silva	PUP	3,036	47.83	-1.03
2012 general election Electorate: 7,180; Turnout: 5,072 (70.64%) −3.9	UDP hold Majority: 44 (0.86%) −26.62	Rene Montero	UDP	2,522	49.72	−11.66
2012 general election Electorate: 7,180; Turnout: 5,072 (70.64%) −3.9	UDP hold Majority: 44 (0.86%) −26.62	Collet Emmanuel Montejo	PUP	2,478	48.86	+14.96
2008 general election Electorate: 6,316; Turnout: 4,708 (74.54%) −5.93	UDP gain from PUP; Majority: 1,294 (27.48%) +23.81	Rene Montero	UDP	2,890	61.38	+14.74
2008 general election Electorate: 6,316; Turnout: 4,708 (74.54%) −5.93	UDP gain from PUP; Majority: 1,294 (27.48%) +23.81	Mario Castellanos	PUP	1,596	33.9	−16.41
2008 general election Electorate: 6,316; Turnout: 4,708 (74.54%) −5.93	UDP gain from PUP; Majority: 1,294 (27.48%) +23.81	Gilroy "Rick" Requena	VIP	29	0.62	-
2008 general election Electorate: 6,316; Turnout: 4,708 (74.54%) −5.93	UDP gain from PUP; Majority: 1,294 (27.48%) +23.81	Nazim Juan	Independent	29	0.62	-
2003 general election Electorate: 6,022; Turnout: 4,845 (80.47%) −10.95	PUP hold Majority: 178 (3.67%) −5.07	Mario Castellanos	PUP	2,438	50.31	−3.3
2003 general election Electorate: 6,022; Turnout: 4,845 (80.47%) −10.95	PUP hold Majority: 178 (3.67%) −5.07	Rene Montero	UDP	2,260	46.64	+1.77
2003 general election Electorate: 6,022; Turnout: 4,845 (80.47%) −10.95	PUP hold Majority: 178 (3.67%) −5.07	Eduardo Juan	Independent	63	1.3	-
2003 general election Electorate: 6,022; Turnout: 4,845 (80.47%) −10.95	PUP hold Majority: 178 (3.67%) −5.07	Ivan Roberts	Independent	26	0.54	-
1998 general election Electorate: 4,107; Turnout: 3,755 (91.42%) +16.99	PUP gain from UDP; Majority: 328 (8.74%) +5.74	Dan Silva	PUP	2,013	53.61	+5.11
1998 general election Electorate: 4,107; Turnout: 3,755 (91.42%) +16.99	PUP gain from UDP; Majority: 328 (8.74%) +5.74	Eduardo Juan	UDP	1,685	44.87	−6.63
1998 general election Electorate: 4,107; Turnout: 3,755 (91.42%) +16.99	PUP gain from UDP; Majority: 328 (8.74%) +5.74	John Mena	NABR	37	0.99	-
1993 general election Electorate: 3,934; Turnout: 2,928 (74.43%) −2.24	UDP gain from PUP; Majority: 88 (3.0%) −2.1	Eduardo Juan	UDP	1,508	51.5	+5.3
1993 general election Electorate: 3,934; Turnout: 2,928 (74.43%) −2.24	UDP gain from PUP; Majority: 88 (3.0%) −2.1	Dan Silva	PUP	1,420	48.5	−2.8
1989 general election Electorate: 3,249; Turnout: 2,491 (76.67%) −5.76	PUP gain from UDP; Majority: 125 (5.1%) −0.8	Dan Silva	PUP	1,277	51.3	+7.8
1989 general election Electorate: 3,249; Turnout: 2,491 (76.67%) −5.76	PUP gain from UDP; Majority: 125 (5.1%) −0.8	Eduardo Juan	UDP	1,152	46.2	−3.2
1984 general election Electorate: 2,539; Turnout: 2,093 (82.43%) n/a	UDP win Majority: 122 (5.9%) n/a	Eduardo Juan	UDP	1,033	49.4	-
1984 general election Electorate: 2,539; Turnout: 2,093 (82.43%) n/a	UDP win Majority: 122 (5.9%) n/a	Assad Shoman	PUP	911	43.5	-
