= Central Farm =

Village in Cayo District, Belize

Coordinates: 17°11′09″N 89°00′06″W

Central Farm is a village in the Cayo District of central interior Belize. The village is in an agricultural region with the most frequent crops being citrus and banana. It is one of the 192 municipalities administered at the village level in the country for census taking purposes. The village had a population of 205 in 2010. This represents roughly 0.3 % of the district's total population. This was a 3% increase from 199 people recorded in the 2000 census. The village of Central Farm hosts the "Taiwan Technical Mission in Beleize" which acts as a Taiwanese agricultural mission to support improved farming practices in Belize as part of Belize–Taiwan relations.
