= Duck Run III =

Village in Cayo District, Belize

Coordinates: 17°15′36″N 89°02′26″W

Duck Run III, alternatively known as Duck Run 3, is a village in the Cayo District of central interior Belize.The village is in an agricultural region where the most common crops are citrus and banana. It is one of 192 village level municipalities for census purposes. The village had a population of 400 in 2010. This represents roughly 0.6% of the district's total population. No census record was taken for the village in 2000. Duck Run III is one of three recognized municipalities with the name "Duck Run" south of Spanish Lookout having its own local government. The other two communities are Duck Run I and Duck Run II.
