= Komkom Vase =

Classic Period Maya artifact

The Komkom Vase is an ancient painted Maya vase featuring one of the longest hieroglyphic texts found in the Maya Lowlands. It was discovered in 2015 at the Maya archaeological site of Baking Pot in Belize and dates back to the Terminal Classic period in Maya history. It is notable for being written during the last decades of centralized rule in the Lowlands and was most likely used as a drinking vessel by a ruler of Komkom, an ancient Maya kingdom that has not yet been located.

== Discovery ==
Archaeologists from the Belize Valley Archaeological Reconnaissance project discovered the first sherds of the Komkom Vase at Baking Pot on July 7, 2015. It was pieced together from 82 fragments found at the site, reconstructing roughly 60% of the original vessel.

== Description ==
The vase is a cylindrical ceramic vessel that was most likely about 21.7 cm (8.5 in) tall in its original form. Although it is fragmented and incomplete, measurements of its interior have been used to estimate that its total volume was a little more than 3 liters (~100 fl. oz). The vessel is intricately painted and features faint gridlines that would have guided the composition of its estimated 202 hieroglyphic blocks.

== Dating ==
The vase, along with other ceramics in its deposit, was dated to the Terminal Classic period based on typology. It features a Long Count hieroglyphic date likely translating to April 27, 812 AD in the Gregorian calendar. Since this date is not linked to any historical event, it could possibly refer to when the vessel was manufactured.

== Text ==
The vase's text, written in Maya hieroglyphs, consists of nine paired double-columns and one single column. The text can be split into three sections: a calendrical record, a detailed historical narrative, and the parentage of the vase's original owner. These sections are divided by both content and artistic style, indicating that the divisions were intentional. The largest and smallest glyph blocks can be found in the calendrical record and the second largest blocks belong to the parentage section.

=== Calendrical Record ===
The Komkom Vase's Long Count date, which is uncommon on ceramic vessels, translates to April 27, 812 AD. The initial Long Count is followed by a Supplementary Series that records the Lord of the Night, an 819-day calendar (one of only two ever discovered in a ceramic text), a fire ritual to a maize god, and a lunar calendar.

Long Count	Tzolkin	Haab	Lord of the Night	Gregorian Date
9.19.1.15.8	1 Lamat	16 Sek	G2	April 27, 812 AD

=== Historical Narrative ===
The narrative begins in 799 AD, thirteen years before the vase was manufactured. It focuses primarily on warfare, describing an attack by the ruler of Naranjo on the neighboring kingdom of Yaxha and the resulting victory from the perspective of the rulers of Komkom. Much of the historical narrative is corroborated by monuments at the site of Naranjo. The narrative also recounts conflict between Naranjo and the kingdom of Tikal.

=== Parentage Statement ===
Although the Komkom Vase's owner is not named in the text, it does identify their father and mother. The father, Sak Witzil Baah, was a ruler of Komkom and the mother belonged to the Naranjo dynasty. Based on this parentage, it is likely that the owner of the vase was a later ruler of Komkom.

== Interpretation ==
The craftsmanship evident in the Komkom Vase's design indicates that it was a prestige item that required significant skill to produce. The destruction of the vase may have been intentional as part of an abandonment ritual when the Maya were leaving the site of Baking Pot. Breaking the vessel could have been intended to release the spirit believed to be living inside it.

The Komkom Vase is unique in Maya archaeology for its description of events that occurred during the period typically associated with Classic Maya collapse. It is difficult to know whether or not it presents an accurate historical narrative, but archaeologists studying the vase still believe it provides important insight. Specifically, the vase presents an insider perspective on the heightened warfare of the Terminal Classic. It also serves as material evidence of the ties between the royal courts of Komkom and Naranjo, giving archaeologists a better understanding of the geopolitical processes that were occurring during this period.

== See also ==
- Baking Pot
- Classic Maya collapse
- Maya ceramics
- Maya script
- Mesoamerican Long Count calendar
