= Duck Run II =

Village in Cayo District, Belize

Coordinates: 17°14′40″N 89°01′44″W

Duck Run II, alternatively known as Duck Run 2, is a village in the Cayo District of central interior Belize. The village is in an agricultural region with the most frequent crops being citrus and banana. It is one of 192 municipalities administered at the village level in the country for census taking purposes. The village had a population of 370 in 2010. This represents roughly 0.6% of the district's total population. No census record was taken for the village in 2000. Duck Run II is one of three recognized municipalities with the name "Duck Run" south of Spanish Lookout having its own local government representation. The other two communities are Duck Run I and Duck Run III.
