= Dan Silva =

Belizean politician

Member of the Belize House of Representatives for Cayo Central
- In office 27 August 1998 – 5 March 2003
- Preceded by: Eduardo Juan
- Succeeded by: Mario Castellanos

Member of the Belize House of Representatives for Cayo Central
- In office 4 September 1989 – 30 June 1993
- Preceded by: Eduardo Juan
- Succeeded by: Eduardo Juan

Personal details
- Party: People's United Party

Daniel Silva is a Belizean politician who served as Minister of Agriculture, Fisheries and Cooperatives from 1998 to 2003 under the Said Musa administration.

He represented the constituency of Cayo Central during his tenure as Cabinet Minister. In 2013, he announced his candidacy to run for the 2017 General Elections in Belize.

On April 27, 2014, he won the PUP standard bearer convention for the Cayo Central Division against business man Luke Espat. Daniel Silva garnered 1,426 votes, while Luke Espat obtained 487 votes.
