= Camalote, Belize =

Camalote
- Location within Belize
- Coordinates: 17.2472°N 88.8176°W
- Country: Belize
- District: Cayo District
- Constituency: Cayo South

Population (2010)
  - Total: 2,562
- Time zone: UTC-6 (Central)

Camalote is a village located along the George Price Highway in Cayo District, Belize. It lies approximately five kilometers west of Belmopan.

== Demographics ==
At the time of the 2010 census, Camalote had a population of 2,562 people in 560 households. Of these, 45.7% were Mestizo, 36.1% Creole, 8.6% Mixed, 2.0% East Indian, 2.0% Mopan Maya, 1.8% Ketchi Maya, 1.1% Garifuna, 0.8% Caucasian, 0.6% Asian, 0.3% Mennonite, 0.2% African and 0.7% others.
