= Hawkesworth Bridge =

Suspension bridge in San Ignacio, Belize

Coordinates: 17.15685°N 89.06830°W

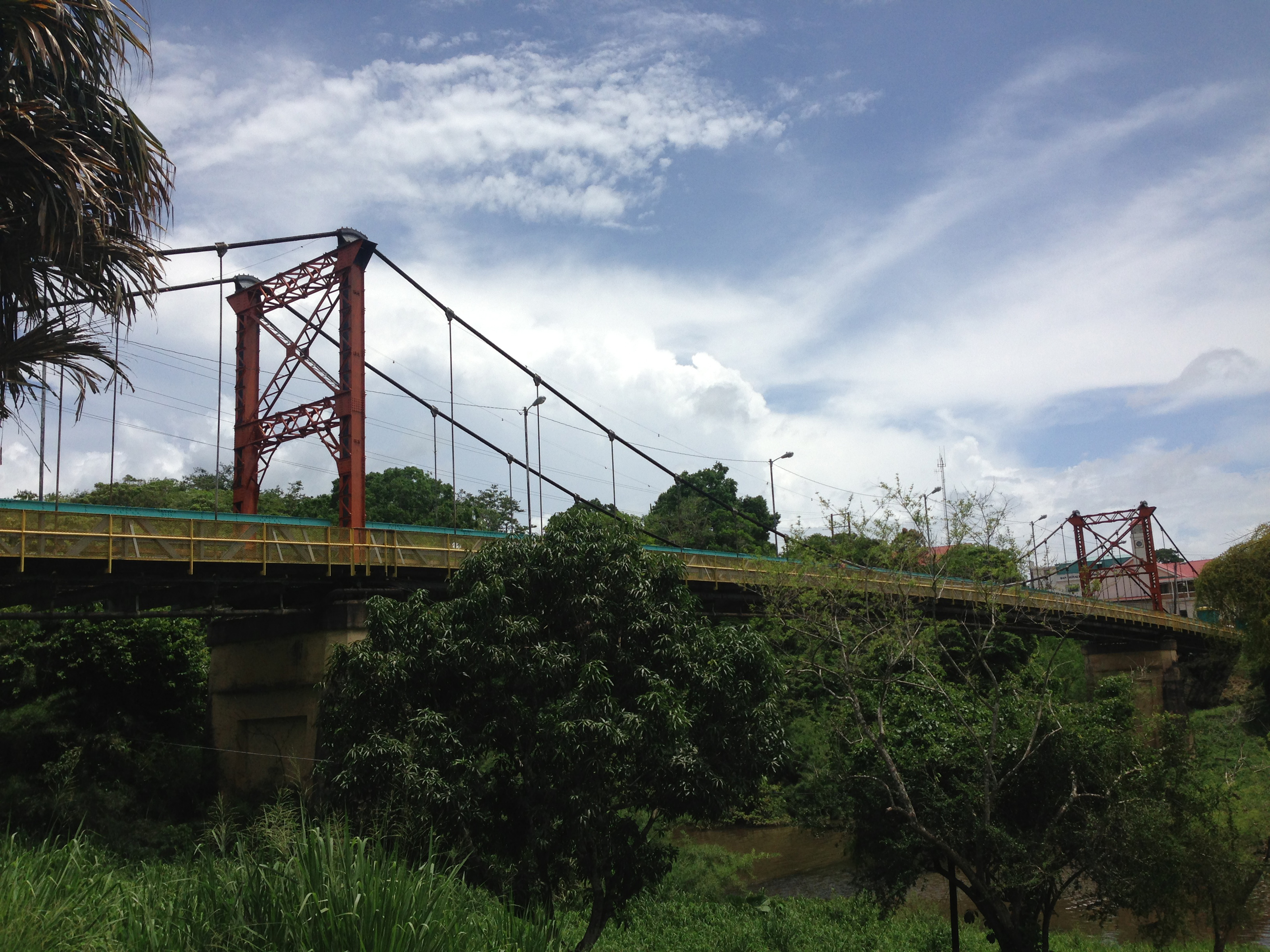
Hawkesworth Bridge over the Macal River

Hawkesworth Bridge is a one lane suspension bridge in San Ignacio, Belize. Built in 1949 and imported from Middlesbrough, England, it crosses the Macal River linking San Ignacio to its sister-town Santa Elena. It is currently the only drivable suspension bridge in Belize. Work began in October 2012 on a new, larger bridge that will link Santa Elena and San Ignacio that will span 154 meters across the Macal River.

Another wooden bridge downstream is only a few feet above the river and is normally used for westbound traffic from the Western Highway into San Ignacio. The wooden bridge was almost entirely destroyed by Hurricane Earl, but is currently being rebuilt. In the interim, the Hawkesworth Bridge is handling intermittent traffic in both directions.

== History ==
It was opened on Saturday August 20, 1949 and was named after the late Sir Edward Gerald Hawkesworth, former governor of British Honduras. The type of bridge was chosen because of very high flooding and that the river logs downstream. The Director of Public Works, Executive Engineer, Chief Engineer for the Crown Agents, who was entrusted the design, agreed to build a suspension bridge. Tenders for the construction of the bridge were called from July 1946 and subsequently contracted were Messrs. Head Wrightson & Co Ltd for the steel work and Messrs Bruntons Ltd of Musselburgh, Scotland for the cables. Construction started on 5 February 1948, supervised by Mr. Eric V. Williams, Executive Engineer and Mr. F. C. Hecker, General Foreman.

The bridge cost $198,384.33 and contained 2,260 tons of concrete, 264 tons of steel work and the cables, made of 7 individual strands and weighing 18 tons each. The foundation was carried to bedrock 12 feet below the surface. The columns were raised to a height of 46 feet and the center to a height of 52 feet, 7 feet above the highest known flood level. The total length of the bridge is 480 feet and the main span is 280 feet, with an additional 100 feet on each side.

It was a great day for the people of British Honduras as the bridge was the final link connecting San Ignacio and Belize City via a road that would later be named Western Highway, then renamed in 2013 as the George Price Highway. The days of the Cayo boats had certainly come to an end. The people of San Ignacio and Santa Elena had gathered at the bridge and it was the largest gathering that the western capital had ever seen to date. People came from near and far to witness the opening. The crowds enjoyed the music that was being played through the loud speakers of Rev. Gregory Sontag while they waited for his Excellency, the Governor of British Honduras, Ronald Herbert Garvey, who arrived just in time for the 5:00 p.m. opening.

Among those present were the Bishop of Honduras, the Chief Justice, members of the Executive and Legislative Councils, members of the Belize City Council, church leaders, heads of Government Departments, the Commissioner of the western district and members of the San Ignacio (El Cayo) and Benque Viejo Town Boards. The opening of the ceremony was done by A. Hamilton Anderson and in his speech mentions, “perhaps as far back as eight years ago (1942), trucks began making very slow and very rough passages to and from the end of the slowly advancing Cayo Road during the dry season. Today people think nothing of going to Belize or coming to San Ignacio.” He then invited the Governor to speak. In his speech, Governor Ronald Herbert Garvey, mentioned how much of a pleasure it was to be in San Ignacio to open the new bridge, and mentioned that this was only the first link and that they had plans to make a road from Roaring Creek to Middlesex and from Middlesex to the wharf in Stann Creek (Dangriga), and that at that time, it was already being surveyed.

The vote of thanks was delivered by Member of the Western Division, Mr. W. Harrison Courtenay. He thanked the Governor for his presence, and the engineers for their dedication and hard work. He hoped that the bridge would contribute and restore relations between this country and the Republic of Guatemala, and bring prosperity not only to the district but to the whole colony. As the children sang “Sons of Hounduras” Governor Garvey proceeded to the ribbon cutting. Two girls, one from San Ignacio and one from Santa Elena, handed him a pair of scissors. He cut the ribbon saying,” I declare the Hawkesworth Bridge at El Cayo duly open” His Excellency and Mrs. Garvey were also given bouquets by the two girls ( Marina Urbina).

The ceremony came to a close with a prayer by the Bishop of Honduras, Rt. Rev. D. J. Wilson. The bridge was crossed by Governor Garvey in his car, followed by church dignitaries, members of Council, Heads of Government and the general public. There was a party for the men who built the bridge and a cocktail for Governor Garvey at the rest house. A dance was also held for the general public at the tennis court, which Governor Garvey also attended. The police orchestra and the Cayo Marimba players supplied the music for the dance.
