= St. Margaret, Belize =

St. Margaret
- Location within Belize
- Coordinates: 17°5′30″N 88°36′43″W
- Country: Belize
- District: Cayo District
- Constituency: Cayo South
- Time zone: UTC-6 (Central)

St. Margaret (sometimes called St. Margaret's) is a rural village in the Cayo District of Belize, Central America. The settlement is located at mile 31 on the Hummingbird Highway, in the Maya Mountains. Hondurans, Guatemalans, Salvadorans, and native Belizeans populate the village. It is home to Five Blues Lake National Park. The village has power, a police station, and cell service. The principal jobs are quarrying and refining limestone and agriculture.

The population in the 2022 census was 1,405 persons.
