= More Tomorrow, Belize =

More Tomorrow
- Location within Belize
- Coordinates: 17.3475°N 88.6939°W
- Country: Belize
- District: Cayo District
- Constituency: Cayo South

Population (2010)
  - Total: 154
- Time zone: UTC-6 (Central)

More Tomorrow is a small village located along the Belize River in Cayo District, Belize. It is the oldest recognized village in the country of Belize, being over 266 yrs old. It was originally used as a trading post along the Belize River for travelers transporting goods from Guatemala to Belize City, and then out to the Caribbean. It is approximately 5 miles from the George Price Highway, and about 20 minutes from Belmopan, the capital of Belize.

More Tomorrow is the home of a Family Theme Park called "Belmopan Beach Adventure Park". The park is a privately owned and has a natural river sandy beach area called "Secret Beach". It also has activities such as camping, horseback and horse drawn wagon riding, river kayaking and tubing, jungle maze, a restaurant, and a horse racing track.

The village is also home to a 5,000 U.S. gallons (19,000 L) water tower, valued at $30,000, constructed in 2014 as the culmination of a project coordinated between Gaither Evangelistic Ministries, in More Tomorrow, and Arkansas Engineers Abroad, a Registered Student Organization at the University of Arkansas. The water tower has piping connected to a nearby church and elementary school and serves as the community's first source of drinking water uncontaminated with E. coli, Staph, or fecal coliform. The sanitation of the tower's water is maintained by the community through the use of chlorine tablets and taught sanitation practices.

.

== Demographics ==
At the time of the 2010 census, More Tomorrow had a population of 154 people in 28 households. Of these, 59.1% were Mestizo, 24.0% Mixed, 7.1% Ketchi Maya, 6.5% East Indian, 3.2% Creole and 0.6% Mopan Maya.

== History ==
More Tomorrow's first village council was established in 1966.
