= Blackman Eddy =

- Nickname: good place
- Motto: its a good place to be at.
- Location within Belize
- Coordinates: 17°13′0″N 88°55′0″W
- Country: Belize
- District: Cayo
- Constituency: Cayo South

Population (2017)
  - Total: 504
- estimate
- Time zone: UTC-6 (Central)

Blackman Eddy is a village located on the banks of the Belize River in the Cayo District, Belize. The George Price Highway runs through the middle of the village.

Blackman Eddy is where the local Maya hid from the Spanish.

== Demographics ==
At the time of the 2010 census, Blackman Eddy had a population of 533. Of these, 42.0% were Creole, 40.2% Mestizo, 12.9% Mixed, 1.3% Mopan Maya, 0.8% Caucasian, 0.8% East Indian, 0.6% Asian, 0.6% Mennonite, 0.4% Garifuna and 0.4% Ketchi Maya.
