= San Ignacio, Belize =

San Ignacio–Santa Elena
- Town
- San Ignacio Town, Santa Elena Town
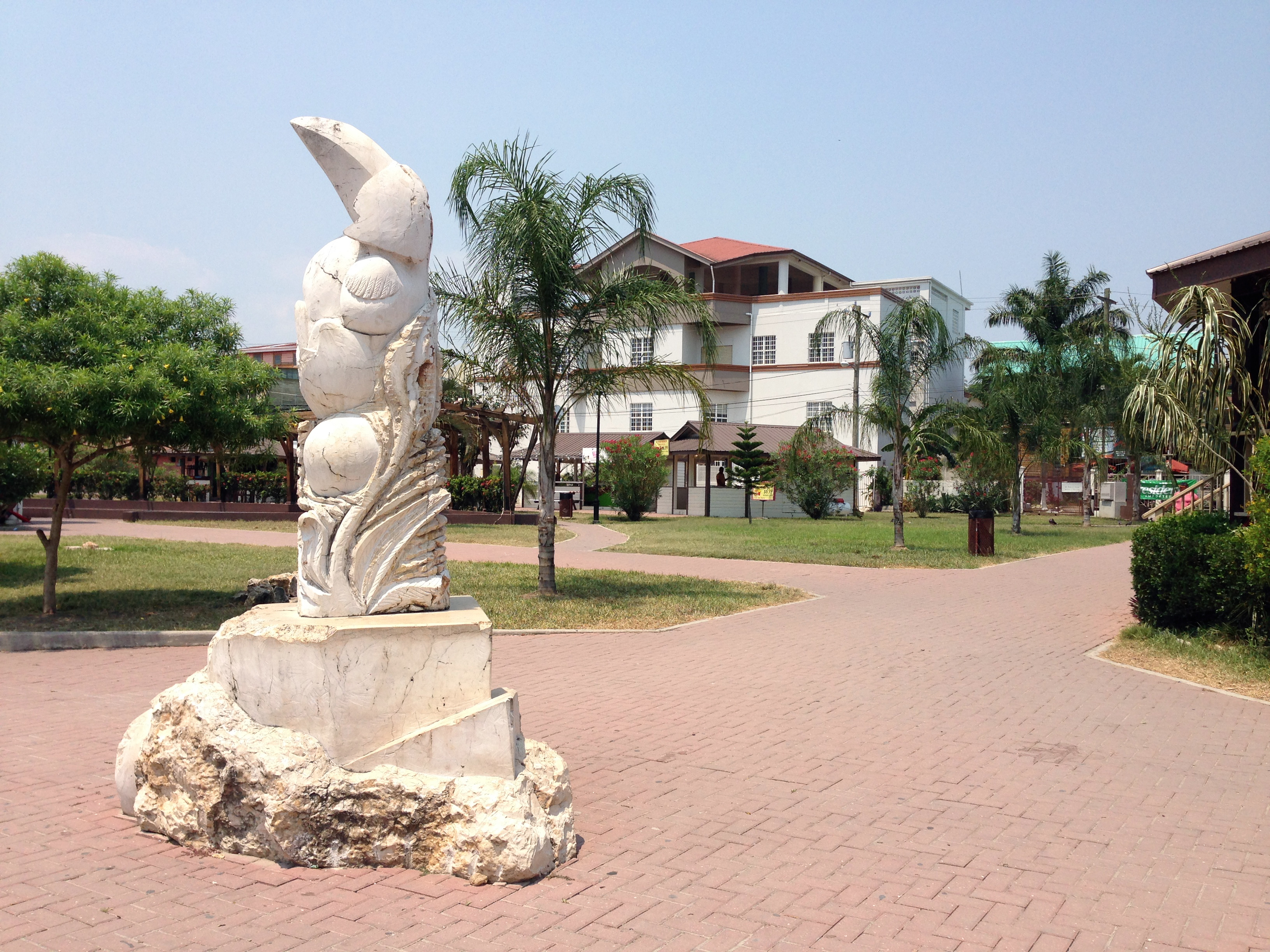
- San Ignacio Town

- Flag
- Nicknames: Cayo, Cayo Town, Twin Towns
- Motto: The Best Come From The West
- Location within Belize
- Coordinates: 17.1588°N 89.0696°W
- Country: Belize
- District: Cayo
- Constituency: Cayo Central, Cayo North, Cayo North East
- Founded: 1800s

Government
  - Mayor: Earl Trapp (UDP)
  - Area Representatives: Michel Chebat (PUP); Orlando Habet (PUP); Alex Balona (PUP)

Area
  - Total: 8.4 km^{2} (3.2 sq mi)
- Elevation: 76 m (249 ft)

Population (2022)
  - Total: 21,229
- Time zone: UTC-6 (Central)
- Climate: Aw

San Ignacio and Santa Elena are towns in western Belize. San Ignacio serves as the cultural-economic hub of Cayo District. It got its start from mahogany and chicle production during British colonisation. Over time it attracted people from the surrounding areas, which led to the diverse population of the town today. San Ignacio is the second largest settlement in Cayo District after the capital, Belmopan.

== History ==
The town was originally named El Cayo by the Spanish. On 19 October 1904, El Cayo was officially declared a town by the government of British Honduras. In the past a creek ran between the Macal and the Mopan rivers one mile outside of San Ignacio going toward Benque Viejo. This creek then fulfilled the definition of an area of land completely surrounded by water and thus the name Cayo, "island". There was a large wooden bridge across this creek in the late 1940s, but since the creek eventually dried up, the area was filled with limestone gravel and today there remains no evidence of its existence. The demise of the creek, however, took away the distinction for the classification of a 'cayo' from the venerable western town of 'El Cayo' and returned it to a regular land mass.

== Geography ==
San Ignacio is situated on the banks of the Macal River, about 63 miles (101 km) west of Belize City and 22 miles (35 km) west of the country's capital: Belmopan. The town has an area of approximately 2.5 square miles (6.5 km^{2}).

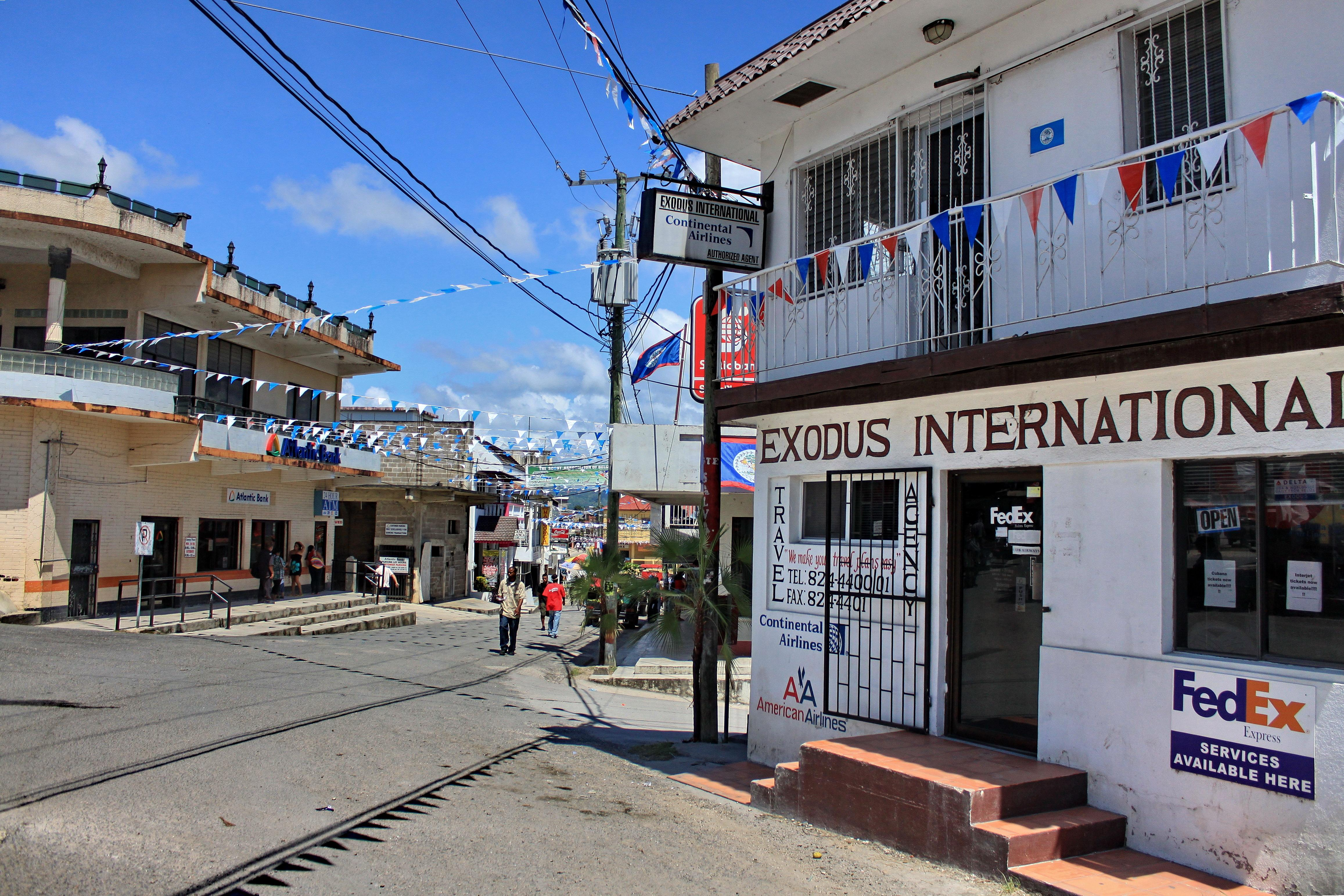
Street scene in San Ignacio

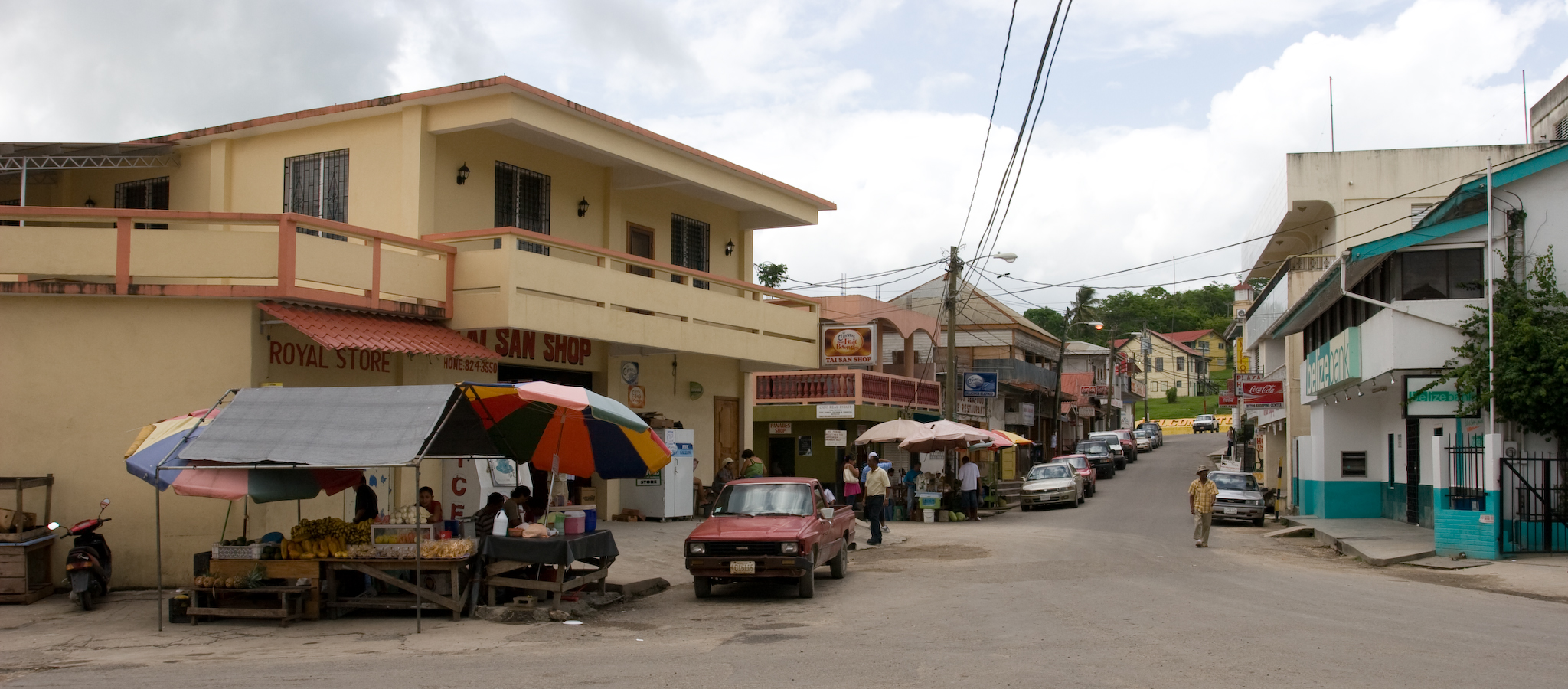
View of San Ignacio, looking towards the Hawkesworth Bridge

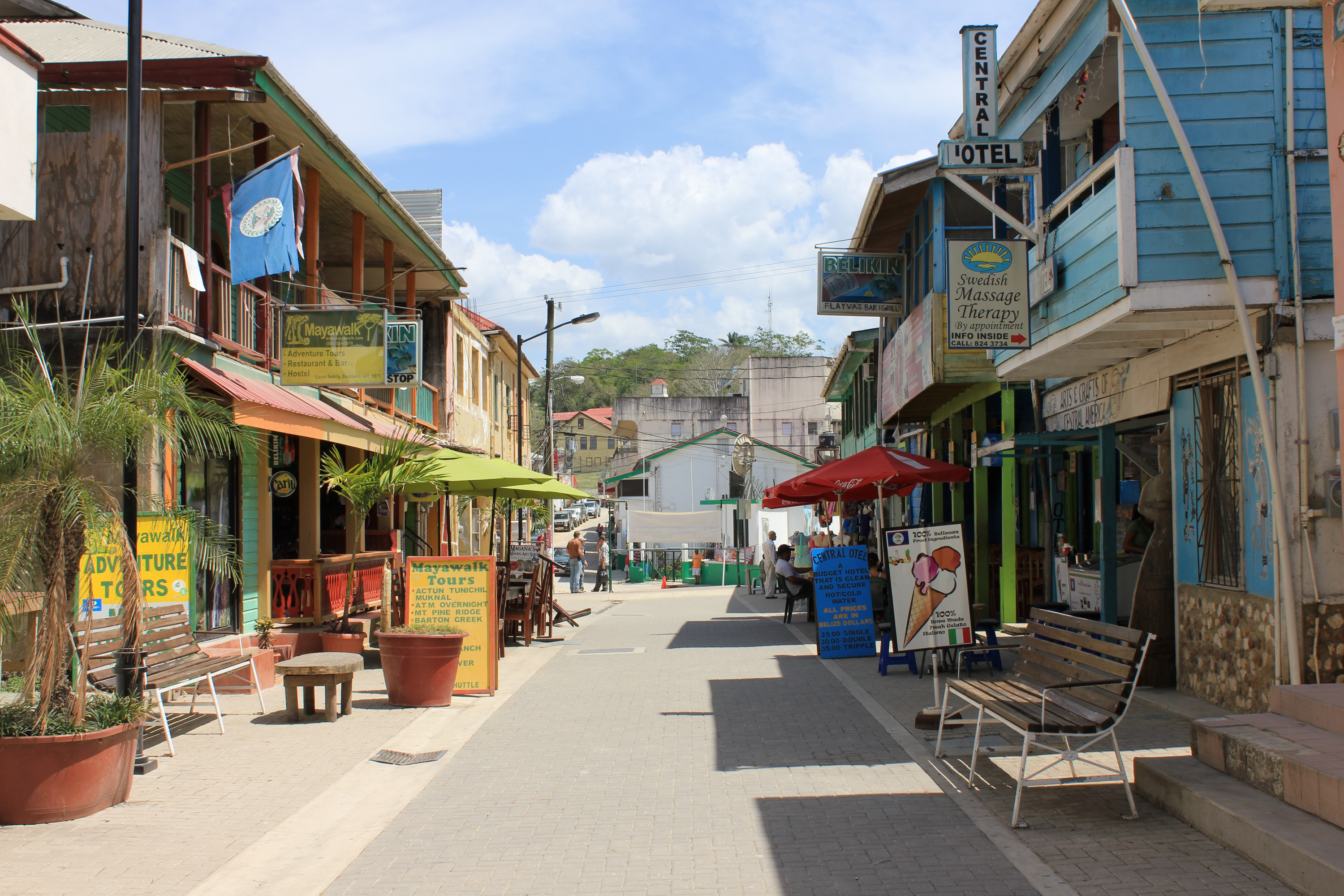
Burns Avenue

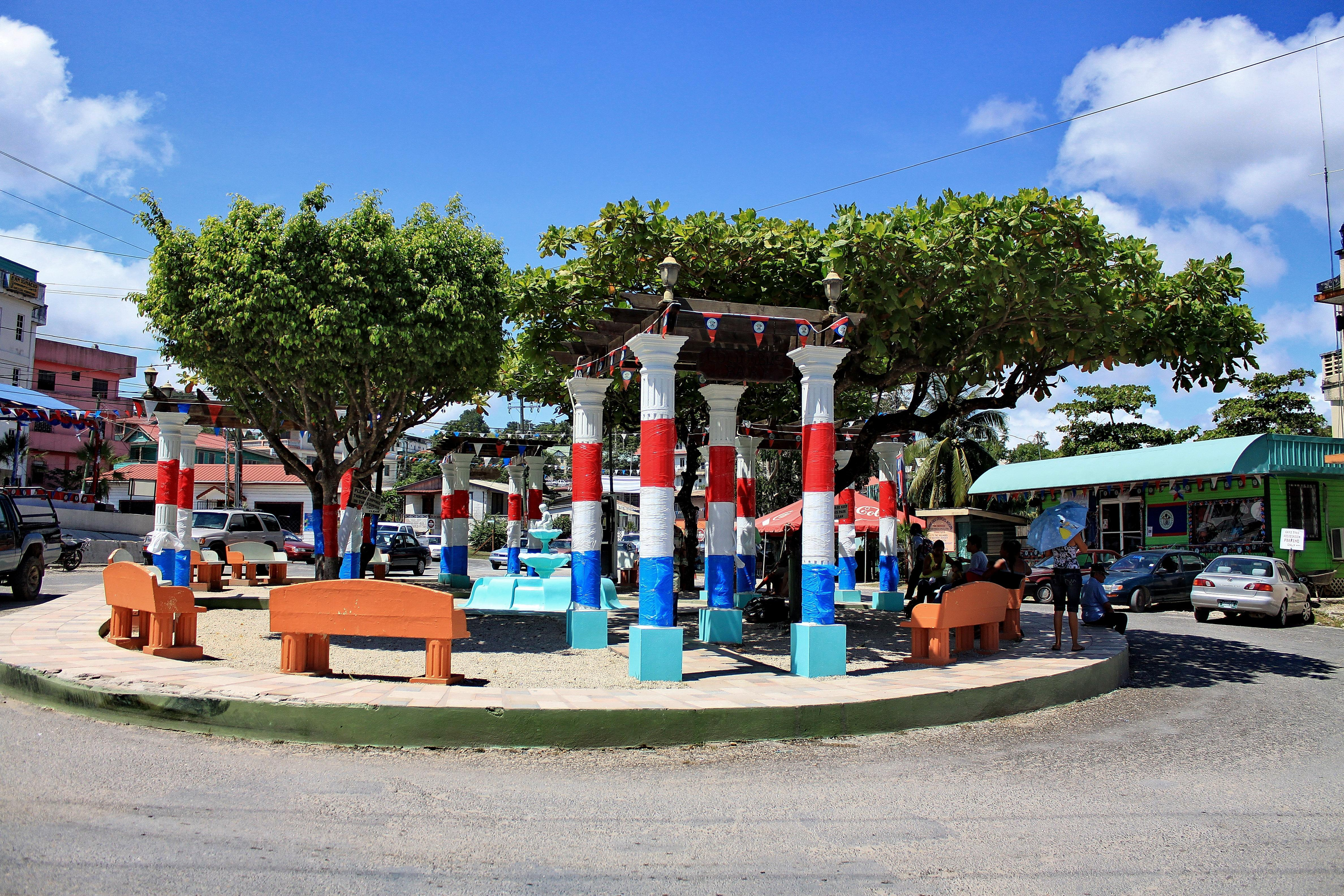
Small park of downtown San Ignacio in front of the police station

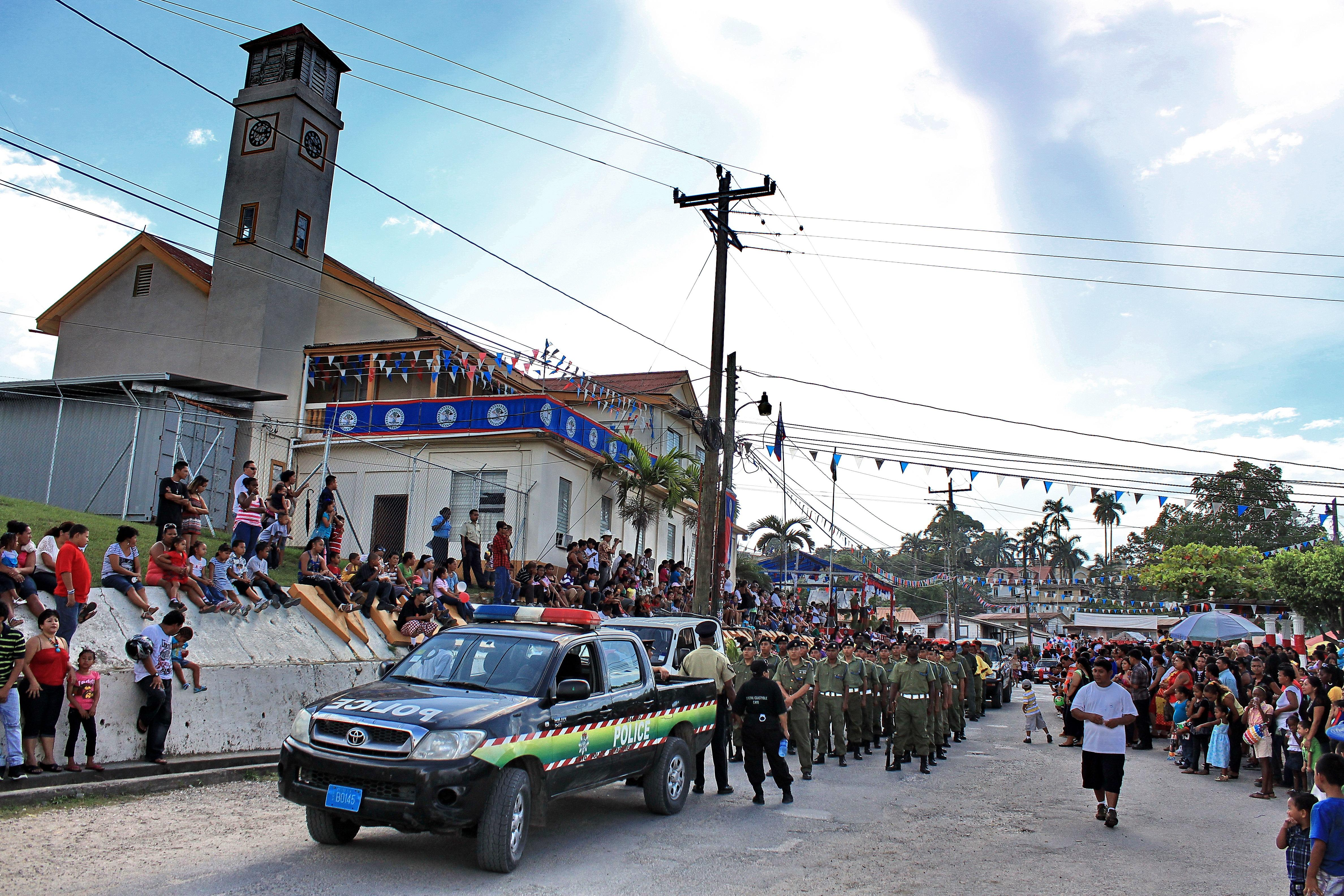
Belize independence day celebration

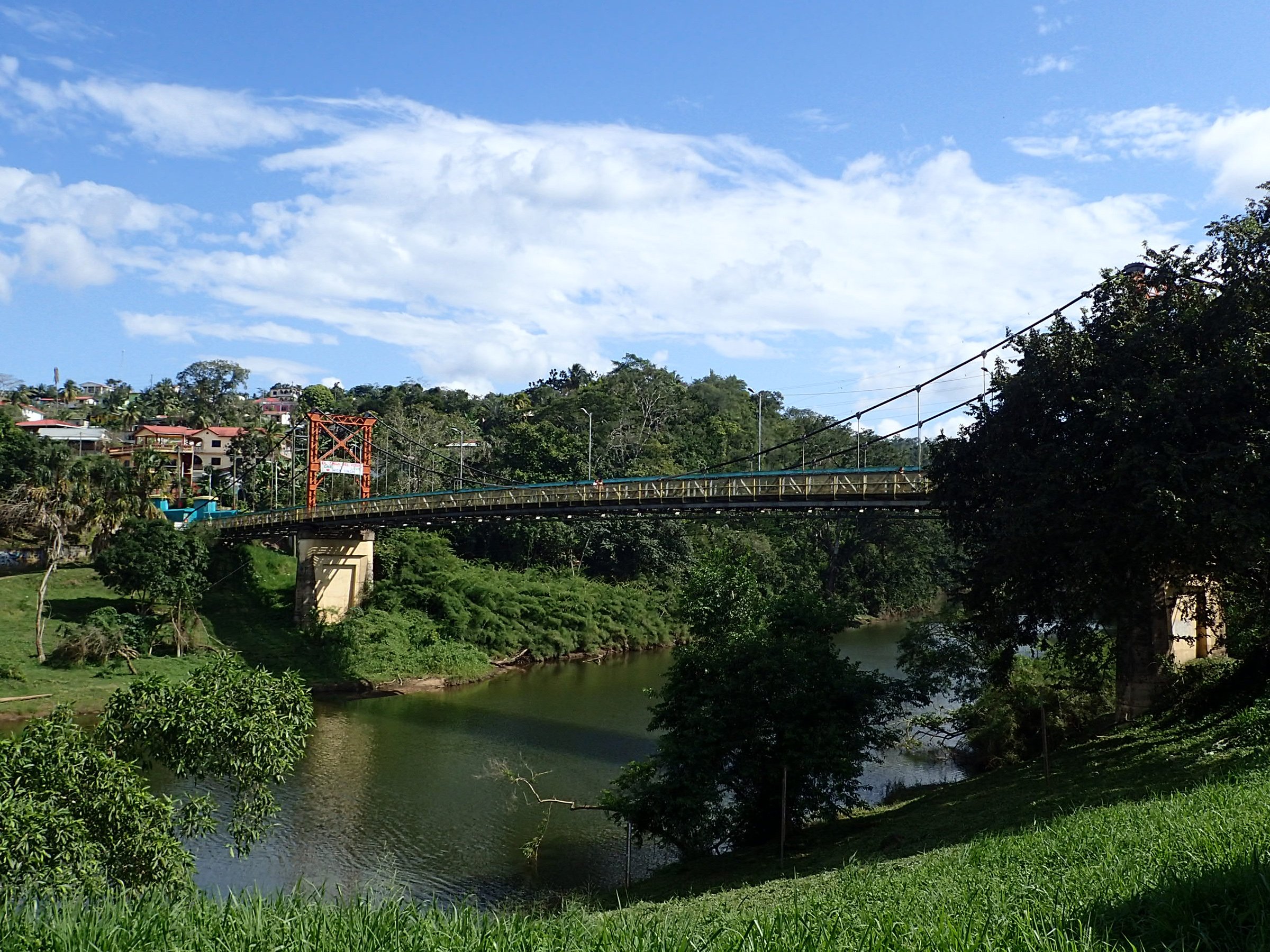
Hawkesworth Bridge

== Demographics ==
The population is largely Mestizo, followed by Kriol, and some Lebanese and Mopan Maya. San Ignacio also boasts a fairly large Chinese population, most of whom emigrated from Guangzhou in waves in the mid-20th century. The Mennonite community of Spanish Lookout is situated a few miles outside San Ignacio. The 2010 census counted 17,878 inhabitants in San Ignacio and Santa Elena, of whom 8,751 are males and 9,127 are females. The total number of households is 4,351 and the average household size is 4.1.

=== Santa Elena ===
In recent years San Ignacio has absorbed the formerly separate town of Santa Elena. San Ignacio and its sister-town Santa Elena make up Belize's third largest urban area. The two towns are connected by Belize's only suspension bridge, the one-lane Hawkesworth Bridge across the Macal river, built in 1949 and another one-lane, low-lying wooden bridge at the market and a two lane bridge, the Santa Elena Bridge constructed in 2018. The two are collectively referred to as the "Twin Towns" although San Ignacio has a larger population. As of 2010, Santa Elena has a population of 7,389 compared with San Ignacio's population of 10,489.

== Government ==
San Ignacio is currently governed by a town council affiliated with the United Democratic Party (UDP). The mayor is Earl Trapp, also of the UDP. Town council elections are held every three years to elect the mayor and council. Both UDP and People's United Party (PUP) candidates participate in town elections. The next municipal elections are scheduled for the year 2020.

At the national level, the San Ignacio/Santa Elena area is represented by three constituencies in the Belize House of Representatives, Cayo Central, Cayo North and Cayo North East.

== Educational institutions ==
San Ignacio has three main colleges. Sacred Heart College of Catholic denomination is the largest institution, with both a high school and a junior college division, and is one of the largest high schools in Belize. Eden Seventh Day Adventist High School and Saint Ignatius High School (Catholic) are also found here.

Galen University was founded in 2003 and is located at Central Farm, a couple of minutes east of San Ignacio. The University of Belize also has an agricultural campus next to Galen.

== Healthcare ==
The city is served by the San Ignacio Hospital, which is a regional clinic, and the Loma Luz Adventist hospital in Santa Elena. It also has various clinics, doctors and pharmacies scattered around town, and "the only official medical electives program run by Belizians."

== Attractions ==
The area around San Ignacio is one of the most popular parts of the country for tourism. Nearby attractions include the ancient Maya ruins of Caracol, Xunantunich, Cahal Pech, and El Pilar. Notable caves to explore include the Actun Tunichil Muknal cave, which includes skeletons, ceramics, and stoneware, and Barton Creek Cave, which is popular among adventure tourists interested in cave canoeing, as well as Crystal Cave at St. Herman's, also known as Mountain Cow Cave, which is challenging physically as visitors have to descend a 15-foot drop to see stalactites, stalagmites, massive crystal formations, ancient ceremonial fire pits, relics, wall carvings, and actual skeletal remains of Mayan sacrificial victims.

Also popular among adventure travelers are nature reserves such as the Chaa Creek Nature Reserve, and the Mountain Pine Ridge Forest Reserve. A day trip to Mountain Pine Ridge allows visitors to go on several hikes and visit waterfalls, caves, and Maya ruins.

Geomorphologically, these eco-reserves and cave systems are defined by the underlying Cayo karst topography, shaped by the Macal River watershed to create extensive subterranean drainage networks and tropical broadleaf habitats.

== See also ==
- Chaa Creek
- Mopan River
