= Cayo District =

District of Belize

Coordinates: 17°N 89°W

- District
- Cayo District and its neighbors (Note: Orange Walk; Belize; Stann Creek; Toledo; In Guatemala: Petén)
- Country: Belize
- Capital: San Ignacio

Area
  - Total: 5,338 km^{2} (2,061 sq mi)

Population (2024 estimate)
  - Total: 103,413
  - Density: 19.37/km^{2} (50.18/sq mi)

Ethnic groups (2022 census)
  - Hispanic/ Mestizo: 67.7%
  - Creole: 16.3%
  - Mayan: 6.7% (Note: 2.6% Kʼicheʼ, 2.4% Mopan, 1.7% Yucatec)
  - Mennonite: 4.2%
  - Garifuna: 1.5%
  - East Indian: 0.9%
  - White: 0.9%
  - Chinese: 0.3%
  - Indian: 0.1%
  - Other: 0.8%

Languages spoken (2022 census)
  - English: 73.8%
  - Spanish: 64.4%
  - Creole: 39.4%
  - Mayan: 5.2% (Note: 2.2% Qʼeqchiʼ, 1.8% Mopan, 1.1% Yucatec)
  - German: 3.5% (Note: Includes speakers of both Plautdietsch and Standard German)
  - Garifuna: 0.5%
  - Chinese: 0.4%
  - Hindi: 0.1%
  - Other: 0.3%
- ISO 3166 code: BZ-CY

A city map of the Cayo District of Belize

Cayo is a district located in the west part of Belize, and it contains the capital, Belmopan. It is the most extensive, second-most populous and third-most densely populated of the six districts of Belize. The district's capital is the town of San Ignacio.

== Geography ==
Being the largest district, it borders Guatemala to the west, Orange Walk district to the north, Belize district to the northeast, Stann Creek district to the southeast and Toledo district to the south. The nation's capital, Belmopan, is located within the district.

Other important towns and cities in the district include Benque Viejo del Carmen, twin towns of San Ignacio and Santa Elena (District's Capital), Seven Miles (El Progreso), San Antonio, Valley of Peace, St. Margaret, Roaring Creek, Armenia, San Jose Succotz, Arenal, Buena Vista, Bullet Tree Falls, Calla Creek, Esperanza, Cristo Rey, Georgeville, Unitedville, Blackman Eddy, Ontario, Camalote, Los Tambos, More Tomorrow and Spanish Lookout.

Major rivers in the district include the Macal River and the Mopan River.

== Boundaries ==
In 1960, the boundaries of the Cayo District were defined as follows:

Commencing at Big Falls, Belize River; thence upward along the course of the Belize River to Labouring Creek, Yalbac Creek and Tu-Tu Creek to the Western Frontier Line; thence following the Frontier Line southward to the crossing of the main divide or watershed of the Maya Mountains; thence in a north-easterly direction along the main divide of the Maya Mountains which forms the watershed between Machiquila River, Belize River and Sibun River systems on the west and north, and Moho River, Rio Grande, Monkey River, Sittee River and North Stann Creek systems on the east and south to the top of the peak known as Arthur's Seat west of Middlesex; thence by a direct line in a north-north-easterly direction to the highest point on the Humming Bird Highway in the Humming Bird Gap; thence by the southern side of the Humming Bird Highway in a westerly direction to a point 70 chains east of St. Margaret's Creek bridge measured along the Highway; thence in a straight line in a northerly direction to the source of the westernmost tributary of Indian Creek; thence downward along the courses of Indian Creek and Sibun River to the mouth of Nancy Porter Creek; thence in a straight line to the point of commencement.

As of 2020, these are still the boundaries used for the District.

== Economy and infrastructure ==
Cayo District is primarily an agricultural district, with the chief crops being citrus fruit (more specifically, oranges, grapefruit, and tangerine), as well as bananas. Recently, oil was found in Spanish Lookout and it is now in production.

There are two major highways in the District, the George Price Highway, that runs from Belize City to the Guatemalan border, and the Hummingbird Highway which starts in Belmopan and ends at the juncture of the Coastal Road and the Southern Highway that ends in the Stann Creek District. In addition to the ruins listed above there are several other important nature reserves including two National Parks, Blue Hole and Guanacaste National Park. Ecotourism is also an integral part of the region's economy.

== Political divisions ==
Politically, Cayo is divided into six constituencies, described in detail here:

- Belmopan: Current representative Oscar Mira (PUP)
- Cayo Central: Current representative Alex Balona (PUP)
- Cayo North: Current representative Michael Chebat (PUP)
- Cayo North East: Current representative Orlando Habet (PUP)
- Cayo South: Current representative Julius Espat (PUP)
- Cayo West: Current representative Mike Guerra (UDP)

== Archaeological sites ==
Cayo District contains several pre-Columbian mayan ruins and sites, among these are Caracol, Xunantunich, Cahal Pech, Baking Pot, Lower Dover and El Pilar.

== Demographics ==
Religion in Cayo (2010 census)
Roman Catholicism	24,229	34.9%
No religion	13,660	19.7%
Pentecostal	10,838	15.6%
Seventh-day Adventist	3,011	4.3%
Mennonite	2,812	4.1%
Nazarene	2,605	3.8%
Baptist	1,843	2.7%
Anglican	1,498	2.2%
Other religion	8,747	12.6%

According to the 2010 Population and Housing Census, Cayo District's total population is of 73,202 residents (compared to the district's 2000 population of 53,715); of whom 36,803 are males and 36,399 are females. The total number of households is 15,497 and the average household size is 4.7.

The southern half of Cayo District is very low densely populated. A large majority of the district's population lives north of the 17th parallel.

=== Ethnicity ===
Ethnicity
Ethnicity	2010		2022	
%	Number	%	Number	%
Mestizo	44,445	63.35%	67,075	67.68%
Creole	10,247	14.60%	16,204	16.35%
European: * German (Mennonite) * British (Anglo-Celtic)	3,596; 2,809; 787	5.12% 4.00% 1.12%	5,038; 4,126; 912	5.08% 4.16% 0.92%
Qʼeqchi Maya	1,408	2.01%	2,574	2.60%
Mopan Maya	1,936	2.76%	2,427	2.45%
Yucatec Maya	1,469	2.09%	1,660	1.67%
Garifuna	975	1.39%	1,448	1.46%
East Indian	806	1.15%	899	0.90%
Chinese/Asian	648	0.92%	340	0.34%
Other	482	0.68%	843	0.85%
Not stated	–	–	597	0.60%
Mixed	4,145	5.91%	–	–
Total	70,157	100%	99,105	100%

=== Rural and urban development ===
In 2010, the total population of Cayo's urban areas was of 36,455; 17,939 males and 18,516 females. 7,468 total households and a 4.9 average household size. The total population of Cayo's rural areas was of 36,747; 18,864 males and 17,883 females. 8,029 total households and a 4.6 average household size.
