= Mennonites in Peru =

Total population
- 907 members (2012)

Regions with significant populations
- Departments of Loreto and Huánuco

Religions
- Anabaptist

Scriptures
- The Bible

Languages
- Spanish · Plautdietsch · Standard German · Asháninka

Mennonites in Peru belong to two quite different groups: converts to the Mennonite faith from different groups of the Peruvian population and very conservative Plautdietsch-speaking ethnic Mennonite Old Colony Mennonites of the so-called Russian Mennonites. Converts to the Mennonite faith are both people who speak Spanish and groups with an indigenous Amerindian background, notably Asháninka. These converts do not differ much from other Protestants in Peru.

Russian Mennonites started to settle in Peru in 2015, with two colonies coming from Bolivia and one colony coming from Belize. These Russian Mennonites have their own customs and language (Plautdietsch) and live in colonies. Very Conservative ethnic Mennonites normally do not engage in missionary activities but look for a quiet and remote place where they can live according to their tradition.

== History ==
Mennonites as a religious group can trace back their roots to the time of the Protestant Reformation. They belonged to the radical wing of the Reformation who tried to base its faith only on the Bible as God's word and live according to it.

Starting in 1683 (Germantown, Pennsylvania), Mennonites from Europe migrated to North America but most came in the 18th and 19th centuries. Mainly since the second half of the 19th century they split into different groups ranging from extremely conservative to very liberal.

Liberal and conservative Mennonites engaged in worldwide missionary work like other North American Protestant denominations. Around the year 1950 the Krimmer Mennonite Brethren started missionary work in the eastern part of Peru in the Amazon rainforest. When the Krimmer Mennonite Brethren merged with the Mennonite Brethren in 1960, the Mennonite Brethren Board of Missions and Services (BOMAS) assumed responsibility for this work. In 1987 the work was continued in association with the Wycliffe Bible Translators, the Swiss Indian Mission, and the South America Mission.

The Mennonite Brethren Church of Peru, Spanish Iglesia Evangélica de los Hermanos Menonitas del Perú, was officially recognized in 1986 by the government of Peru.

In 2015 two Mennonite colonies called Wanderland (Vanderland) in Ucayali Province and Österreich (Usterreich) in Huánuco Region were founded by Ethnic German Mennonites from Bolivia. In Österreich colony there are about 25 families which means roughly 150 to 200 people. Wanderland is located near Pucallpa, Ucayali Province.

In 2017/18 another group of very conservative Plautdietsch speaking Mennonites from Belize with 45 families, all together about 300 people, started a new colony near Tierra Blanca, Sarayacu District, Ucayali Province, Loreto Region. A 2020 survey found that there are more than 200 Mennonite colonies in nine Latin American countries, with 4 in Peru.

== Colonies and villages ==
There are 6 colonies of ethnic mennonites in Peru. Wanderland, Österreich and Providencia in Tierra Blanca, Loreto, Chipiar between Ucayali and Loreto and Masisea in Ucayali. As of 2024 there is also a new colony under construction called Salamanca.

Colonies
Colony	Departamento	Established	Parent
Wanderland	Loreto	-	Bolivia
Österreich	Loreto	-	Bolivia
Providencia	Loreto	-	Little Belize
Chipiar	Ucayali/Loreto	-	Shipyard, Belize
Masisea	Ucayali	-	Bolivia
Salamanca	-	-	Salamanca, Mexico

== Members and congregations ==
In 2012 the Conferencia Peruana Hermanos Menonitas had 441 members in 9 congregations, the Nationwide Fellowship Churches 10 members in 1 congregation and the Iglesia Evangélica Menonita del Perú 456 members in 20 congregations. In 2018 there were 3 colonies of Old Colony Mennonites with a total population of several hundred people.
