= Richmond Hill, Belize =

Richmond Hill
- Location within Belize
- Coordinates: 18°00′00″N 88°34′00″W
- Country: Belize
- District: Orange Walk District
- Elevation: 16 m (52 ft)
- Time zone: UTC-6 (Central)

Richmond Hill was a Mennonite settlement of Old Colony Mennonites in Orange Walk District in Belize, near Orange Walk Town. It was founded in 1960 by Mennonites from the Peace River area in Alberta, Canada, two years after the Belizean Mennonite settlements Blue Creek, Shipyard and Spanish Lookout were founded. Economic hardships led to the abandoning of the settlement in 1965.
