= Blue Creek, Orange Walk =

Blue Creek
- Location within Belize
- Coordinates: 17°54′N 88°54′W
- Country: Belize
- District: Orange Walk District

Population (2022)
  - Total: 841
- Time zone: UTC-6 (Central)
- Climate: Aw

Blue Creek, also Blue Creek Colony, is a Mennonite settlement that is also an administrative village in Orange Walk District in Belize. It borders Blue Creek river, which forms the border to Mexico. Its inhabitants are Plautdietsch-speaking Russian Mennonites.

In 1958 Blue Creek was founded by Old Colony Mennonites from Mexico. Disputes about the use of mechanical tools, especially chain saws, soon led to conflicts, which resulted in the founding of an Evangelical Mennonite Mission Conference congregation in 1966 there, while others left to Bolivia, Mexico and Canada. In the end also the leaders of the Old Colony church left, forcing members to decide whether they would leave with them or join other groups. In 1978 families of the Kleine Gemeinde congregation from Spanish Lookout population moved to Blue Creek, to form a congregation there. Today about half of population is in the modern Evangelical Mennonite Mission Church, which is part of the Evangelical Mennonite Mission Conference, while the other half is in the more conservative Kleine Gemeinde.

Since about 1980 the population of Blue Creek has been around 100 families. According to the 2010 census, Blue Creek had 407 residents in 111 households. The population has more than doubled between 2010 and 2022 censuses, reaching 841 as of 2022.

Historical population
Year	Pop.	±%
1987	400	—
2000	767	+91.8%
2010	407	−46.9%
2022	841	+106.6%

== See also ==
- Mennonites in Belize
