= Manitoba (disambiguation) =

Manitoba is a province of Canada.

Manitoba may also refer to:

- Manitoba (computer chip), a computer chip made by Intel in 2006
- Manitoba (horse), a British-Australian Thoroughbred racehorse
- Lake Manitoba, a lake in Manitoba, Canada
- Manitoba Colony, Mexico, Mennonite colony in Mexico
- Manitoba Colony, Bolivia, ultraconservative Mennonite colony in Bolivia
- Manitoba Junction, Minnesota, an unincorporated community in the United States

== Music ==
- Manitoba (American band), punk rock band formed in New York City
  - Richard Manitoba (born 1954), American musician and satellite radio DJ
- Manitoba (Canadian band), electronic band led by Dan Snaith

== Transportation ==
- Manitoba (HBC vessel), operated by the Hudson's Bay Company from 1880 to 1884, see Hudson's Bay Company vessels
- Manitoba (1889 ship), the first steel-hulled ship to be built in Canada (see Polson Iron Works)
- Manitoba (1966 ship), a lake freighter operated by Lower Lakes Towing
- 45558 Manitoba, a British LMS Jubilee Class locomotive

== See also ==
- Manitoba Colony (disambiguation)
- Republic of Manitobah
