= Upper Barton Creek =

- Location within Belize
- Coordinates: 17.1000°N 88.9400°W
- Country: Belize
- District: Cayo District

Population (2010)
  - Total: 380
- Time zone: UTC-6 (Central)
- Climate: Am

Upper Barton Creek is a mixed Mennonite settlement and expats in Cayo District in Belize in the area of the Barton Creek. The Mennonites in Upper Barton Creek are ethnic Mennonites of the Noah Hoover group.

Upper Barton Creek used to be a unique settlement of reformers from different Anabaptist backgrounds, who wanted to create a Mennonite community free of modernistic trends and in nonconformity to the world to live a simple Christian life. It was established in 1969 by Plautdietsch-speaking "Russian" Mennonites mostly from Spanish Lookout and later also from Shipyard in Belize, and Pennsylvania German-speaking families from Old Order Mennonite and Amish backgrounds, who originally came from the US and settled first in Pilgrimage Valley. In the founding of Upper Barton Creek three men and their families were very important, two of them came from Pilgrimage Valley and one from Spanish Lookout.

Following their Ordnung the Mennonites of Upper Barton Creek at one time did not own any equipment with motors, including cars, nor did they use electricity. A saw mill there was powered by horses.They farmed with horses on a small scale, producing vegetables, fruit, cattle, honey, fruit trees etc. The original settlers practiced strict church discipline. Both men and women dressed Plain similar to Old Order Mennonites and Amish with men wearing beards. There was no education above elementary school. The Mennonites of Upper Barton Creek were counted to the Noah Hoover group, which originally was from central Pennsylvania. However after 2017 these Mennonites moved to Birdwak and Springfield and some rather progressive Old Order Mennonites from Ontario (Canada) have moved in.

Daughter colonies of Upper Barton Creek are Springfield. In 1980 the total population was 60, in 1988 the total population was 157 including 45 church members and 2 ministers. In 2010 it had a population of 380, with an average household size of 7, reflecting the family-oriented conservative Mennonite culture.

== Literature ==
- Carel Roessingh and Tanja Plasil (Editors): Between Horse & Buggy and Four-Wheel Drive: Change and Diversity Among Mennonite Settlements in Belize, Central America, Amsterdam 2009.
- Dale J. Nippert: Agricultural Colonization: The Mennonites of Upper Barton Creek, Belize, Memphis 1994.
- Helmut Schneider: Tradition und Veränderung in Belize (Mittelamerika): ein soziologischer Vergleich der Gemeinden San Ignacio und Upper Barton Creek, Berlin 1990.
