= Tierra Blanca, Ucayali =

Tierra Blanca
- Location in Peru
- Coordinates: 6.555469°S 75.177262°W
- Country: Peru
- Region: Loreto
- Province: Ucayali
- Elevation: 128 m (420 ft)

Population (2007)
  - Total: 1,503
- Time zone: UTC-5 (PET)
- Climate: Af

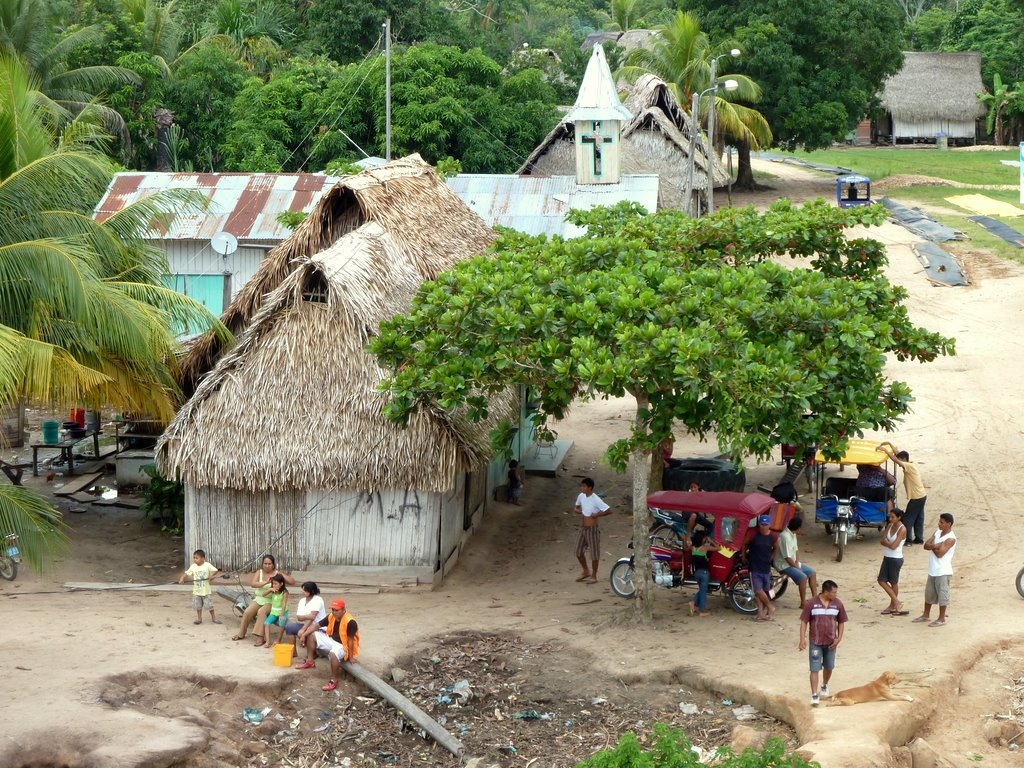
Tierra Blanca, Sarayacu, Ucayali

Tierra Blanca is a municipality in the Sarayacu District of Peru. It is located in the Ucayali Province of the Loreto Region. Its postcode (ZIP) is 16440.

Its mayor in 2014 was Jorge Díaz Ruíz. Its population in 2017 was 1,602 people, 830 men and 772 women, living in 356 houses or flats (viviendas).

In 2017/18 a group of very conservative Plautdietsch-speaking Mennonites from Belize with 45 families, all together about 300 people, started a new colony to the west of Tierra Blanca. These Mennonites are very conservative ethnic Mennonites with a Dutch-German background who belong to the Old Colony Mennonites of the so-called Russian Mennonites.

== See also ==
- Mennonites in Peru
