= Tierra Blanca =

Tierra Blanca could mean:

== Places named Tierra Blanca ==
- Mexico
  - Tierra Blanca, Guanajuato
  - Tierra Blanca, San Luis Potosí
  - Tierra Blanca, Veracruz
  - Tierra Blanca, Zacatecas
- Peru
  - Tierra Blanca, Ucayali
- Costa Rica
  - Tierra Blanca, Cartago
- United States
  - Tierra Blanca Creek, a creek in Texas

== See also ==
- Battle of Tierra Blanca, a famous battle fought during the Mexican Revolution.
