= Little Belize =

- Location within Belize
- Coordinates: 18°12′N 88°21′W
- Country: Belize
- District: Corozal District
- Constituency: Corozal South East
- Established: 1978

Area
  - Total: 143.6 km^{2} (55.4 sq mi)

Population (2022)
  - Total: 2,888
  - Density: 20.11/km^{2} (52.1/sq mi)
- Time zone: UTC-6 (Central)
- Climate: Aw

Little Belize is a colony of conservative Plautdietsch-speaking "Russian" Mennonites, known as "Old Colony Mennonites", in the Corozal District of Belize. It is part of the Corozal South East constituency. Little Belize is located east of Progresso at an elevation of 1 meter above sea level. Because the Mennonite colony is close to Progresso, it is sometimes called "Progresso".

According to the 2000 census, the population of Little Belize was 2,059 people. In 2010 the population had grown to 2,650 people in 427 households. Of these, 98.8% were Mennonite, 0.8% Mestizo, 0.2% Mixed, 0.1% Yucatec Maya and 0.1% Ketchi Maya.

In terms of languages spoken (multiple answers allowed), 98.3% spoke German, 19.5% Spanish, 4.5% English and 0.2% Garifuna; 0.3% could not speak.

In 2017 population has reached 2,830 people. Little Belize is the second most populous Mennonite settlement in the country, after Shipyard.

Historical population
| Year | Pop. | ±% |
|---|---|---|
| 1987 | 1,004 | — |
| 2000 | 2,207 | +119.8% |
| 2010 | 2,650 | +20.1% |
| 2022 | 2,888 | +9.0% |

== See also ==
- Mennonites in Belize
