= Pilgrimage Valley =

- Location within Belize
- Coordinates: 17°09′00″N 89°02′00″W
- Country: Belize
- District: Cayo District

Population (2000)
  - Total: 21
- Time zone: UTC-6 (Central)

Pilgrimage Valley is a small settlement in Cayo District, Belize, some 5 km east of San Ignacio.

It was founded in 1965 by 10 German speaking Mennonite families to escape increasing secularism. Some came from other Mennonite Colonies in Belize, others from North America (Pennsylvania, Ohio, Arkansas and Ontario), namely the Stoll, Martin, Wanner and Mill families, who were very large, one father e.g. had 22 children. Roessingh writes: "… the interesting thing about these Mennonites is the fact that they had a 'different kind of background'. Beside that they were Old Order [Mennonite] and not Old Colony [Mennonite]; there was also the influence of the Amish which makes this group special." Preachers were Victor and Harold Stoll.

Constant theft of livestock became an existential threat to the settlement and many left, going either back to North America, to Upper Barton Creek or elsewhere. Roessingh writes: "… this settlement never came to the point where it was possible to create a stable existence." In 1980 the settlement seemed abandoned, but later it was recovered. In the 2000 census it had only 21 inhabitants and in 2011 it had fewer than 100 inhabitants. The inhabitants belong to the same Mennonite group as Upper Barton Creek and Springfield.
