= Indian Creek Colony =

Indian Creek
- Location within Belize
- Coordinates: 17°45′N 88°44′W
- Country: Belize
- District: Orange Walk District
- Established: 1987

Area
  - Total: 91.2 km^{2} (35.2 sq mi)

Population (2022)
  - Total: 1,080
  - Density: 11.8/km^{2} (31/sq mi)
- Time zone: UTC-6 (Central)
- Climate: Am

Indian Creek is a Mennonite settlement that is also an administrative village in Orange Walk District in Belize. Its inhabitants are German-speaking so called "Russian" Mennonites. It was founded in 1989.

== History ==
The origin of the Indian Creek Colony came about from Russian-speaking Old Order Mennonites that had set up the Shipyard, Belize colony in British Honduras in 1958. They later migrated and founded the Indian Creek Colony in 1989. The colony shares characteristics with Mennonites in North America except the Indian Creek Colony states that the Church owns all the land and sells it only to church members as opposed to private ownership. Non-Mennonites can freely travel through but are unable to buy any land or run a business there. They farm the land using traditional Mennonite practices though their crops failed in the 2010s due to droughts and church members failing to pay for seeds in time for planting. In 2017, they reached out to Mennonites in the United States for assistance. The American Mennonites arranged for new greenhouses and new irrigation systems to be sent to Indian Creek Colony.

== Demographics ==
Historical population
| Year | Pop. | ±% |
|---|---|---|
| 2000 | 747 | — |
| 2010 | 904 | +21.0% |
| 2022 | 1,080 | +19.5% |

At the time of the 2010 census, Indian Creek had a population of 903 people in 150 households. Of these, 99.7% were Mennonite, 0.1% Ketchi Maya, 0.1% Mestizo and 0.1% Yucatec Maya. The population have increased to 1,080 as of the national census of 2022. As part of their education, the Mennonites of Indian Creek Colony study in German but are taught English as an additional language at schools.

== See also ==
- Mennonites in Belize
