= Noah Hoover Mennonite =

Group of Old Order Mennonites

The Noah Hoover Mennonites, called "Old Order Mennonite Church (Hoover)" by the Mennonite World Conference, and sometimes called "Scottsville Mennonites”, are a group of very plain Old Order Mennonites that originally came from the Stauffer Mennonites and later merged with several other groups. Today it is seen as an independent branch of Old Order Mennonites. The group differs from other Old Order Mennonites by having settlements outside the US and Canada (in Belize) and by attracting new members from other groups on a larger scale. They have more restrictions on modern technology than all other Old Order Mennonite groups. They are rather intentionalist minded than ultra traditional.

== History ==
The Noah Hoover Mennonites have a complicated history because they did not just separate from one other Old Order Mennonite group but emerged from a series of splits and mergers of different Old Order groups.

The events that led to the Noah Hoover Mennonites as an independent group of Old Order Mennonites started in 1944 when a group around Bishop Phares O. Stauffer left the main body of the Stauffer Mennonites in Snyder County, Pennsylvania, because they strongly opposed the use of food ration stamps during World War II. Traditional Mennonites are opposed to everything that has to do with war. In 1945/46 a controversy about church discipline led to the withdrawal of the vast majority of the members of the shortly before established Phares O. Stauffer group forming a new group which choose Aaron Martin as minister and later as bishop.

Deacon Jonas Nolt of the new Aaron Martin group objected to growing and using tobacco and some forms of modern farm machinery. He felt strongly that chicks should be hatched by brooding hens instead of being bought from a hatchery. The people around him formed a new group in 1949 that over several years attracted more and more people from the Aaron Martin group and eventually choose Titus B. Hoover (1925–2016) as bishop.

In 1952 the new Titus Hoover group in Snyder County was joined by most of the members of the "Reformed Amish Christian Church" from Tennessee which originally was part of the "Amish Christian Church", a group that originally had been established in 1894 near Berne, Indiana, by David Schwartz (1862–1953). Through the merger the Reformed Amish Christian Church came to an end as independent church, because almost all of its members joined the Titus Hoover group.

Amish from Hohenwald, Tennessee (originally from Adams County, Indiana), and individual "Russian" Mennonites and Orthodox Mennonites joined the Titus Hoover group. When in 1954 a group of twenty-five people from the extended Hoover and Sherk families left the David Martin Mennonites in Ontario they and the Titus Hoovers tried to merge, but in the end less than half of the ones, who had left the David Martins chose to unite with the Titus Hoovers and move to Pennsylvania. The ones, who did not merge with the Titus Hoovers, tried to merge with the Reidenbach Mennonites and later with other groups formed the Orthodox Mennonites.

The Noah Hoover Mennonites then emerged from a split from the Titus Hoover group in 1963 in Snyder County, Pennsylvania, over Titus Hoover's doctrine of the one true church, which was rejected by a majority who subsequently formed the new Noah Hoover group. In the late 1960s, North American, Pennsylvania German-speaking Mennonites settled in Pilgrimage Valley and Upper Barton Creek in Belize, where they were joined by some Plautdietsch-speaking "Russian" Mennonites, who had come to Belize from Mexico starting in 1958. Later some of these Mennonites joined the Noah Hoover group.

In 1978, they left Snyder County and shifted their center to Scottsville, Kentucky, where they created their main settlement. In 1987 Noah Hoover Mennonites were located in Snyder County, Pennsylvania, Allen County, Kentucky (near Scottsville), and Upper Barton Creek in Belize, Central America. They had an associated group in Huron County, Ontario.

After the death of Elmo Stoll in 1998, the five "Christian Communities" he had founded disbanded. One of these communities, located in Holland, Kentucky, joined the Noah Hoover Mennonites, while parts of the community in Decatur, Tennessee, moved to Delano, Tennessee, where they also joined the Noah Hoovers.

== Customs and beliefs ==
Noah Hoover Mennonites believe in the same Mennonite principles as other Old Order Mennonites. Concerning the use of technology, the group is the most conservative of all Mennonite groups as they permit no engine power at all. Their Plain dress looks very similar to the dress of Old Order Amish and since men wear beards, they can easily be taken for Old Order Amish, only the fact that they also wear mustaches distinguishes them from the Amish. They use mostly Standard German for Church and Bible reading, and Pennsylvania German and Plautdietsch (in Belize) in everyday life. English is also used in Church and among some members, but without a general tendency of shifting to English. Stephan Scott writes:

Many people from various backgrounds have been attracted to the Noah Hoover group. The ultra-conservative stance on technology combined with firm Biblicism, intense spirituality, and high morals standards have had a wide appeal.

Contrary to popular belief, Old Order groups do not simply stay as they always have been, but have to struggle in many ways to adapt to the modern world and to preserve traditions that are important to them. Because the Noah Hoover Mennonites have such a complicated history of splits and mergers, they are unable to rely on tradition in the same way in which other very conservative groups like, e.g., the Swartzentruber Amish do, so they have had to find out in a longer process how they wish to live. This led to a community that is more intentionalist minded than ultra traditional. In worldview and practice they show some similarities with the Orthodox Mennonites, with whom they have kept respectful relationship.

== Settlements, members and population ==
In 1961 the Titus Hoover group, from which the Noah Hoovers emerged, had 64 members. Of these members, 43 were of Reformed Amish Christian Church descent. In 1987 the Noah Hoovers had about 150 members and a total population that can be estimated at around 400. Around 1996 the group had approximately 300 members.

According to the Mennonite World Conference, of which the Hoover Mennonites are not a member, they had five congregations in the United States with 400 baptized members and three congregations in Belize with 175 baptized members in 2015. The same numbers were given in 2008/9 by Donald Kraybill.

In 2015 the group had the following communities (or church districts or settlements): three in Allen County, Kentucky (two west of Scottsville and one near Holland), two in Missouri (Rich Hill and Richards), one in Ohio, north of Winchester, one in Delano, Tennessee, and three in Belize. The total population in 2015 was about 2,400 people.

=== Belize ===
In 1987, 45 members were living in Belize, where their total population stood at 157. In 2010 their three main Belizean settlements Upper Barton Creek, Springfield and Pine Hill together had a population of 855.

== Literature ==
- Frederick Schrock: The Amish Christian Church – Its History and Legacy, Monterey TN 2001. (In this book 4 of the 16 chapters describe the history of the Titus Hoover and the Noah Hoover group since the merger with the Reformed Amish Christian Church.)
- Eric Brende: Better Off: Flipping the Switch on Technology. (The book describes the Noah Hoover Mennonite Community near Scottsville without mentioning the name of the group.)

== See also ==
- Michigan Amish Churches, an Old Order Amish affiliation that is more evangelical and more open to outsiders than other Old Order Amish affiliations.
