= Los Jagueyes =

Mennonite community in Chihuahua, Mexico

Los Jagueyes, also known as Quellenkolonie, is a Mennonite community in the municipality of Naimquipa, Chihuahua in northern Mexico that started with a group of Plautdietsch speaking Mennonites that bought the Los Jagueyes Ranch and immigrated from Manitoba, Canada in 1948.

The colony was mainly settled by member of the Kleine Gemeinde but also by Old Colony Mennonites and Sommerfelders, migrating from Western Canada to preserve their traditional belief, culture and language which came under pressure through encroaching modernity.

== See also ==
- Mennonites in Mexico
