= Barton Creek (disambiguation) =

Barton Creek may refer to:

- Barton Creek, a river in Texas
- Barton Creek, Texas, a census-designated place in Texas
- Barton Creek (Belize), a river and an area in Belize
