= Pine Hill, Belize =

Pine Hill
- Location within Belize
- Coordinates: 16°14′44″N 88°49′48″W
- Country: Belize
- District: Toledo District

Population (2022)
  - Total: 334
- Time zone: UTC-6 (Central)
- Climate: Af

Pine Hill is a Mennonite village in Toledo District, Belize, some 15 km north of the district capital Punta Gorda.

Pine Hill is a daughter colony of the Upper Barton Creek settlement. It was founded around 1997. It is home to very conservative Mennonites, who belong to the Noah Hoover branch of Old Order Mennonites.

The community makes a living of farming, of cheese and other dairy production and of wood working. They also raise cattle and keep bees for honey production. There is also horse powered saw mill at Pine Hill.

== Demographics ==
Historical population
Year	Pop.	±%
2000	97	—
2010	206	+112.4%
2022	334	+62.1%

At the time of the 2010 census, Pine Hill had a population of 206. Of these, 100.0% were Mennonite.

== See also ==
- Mennonites in Belize
