= Mennonites in Bolivia =

Religious denomination in South America

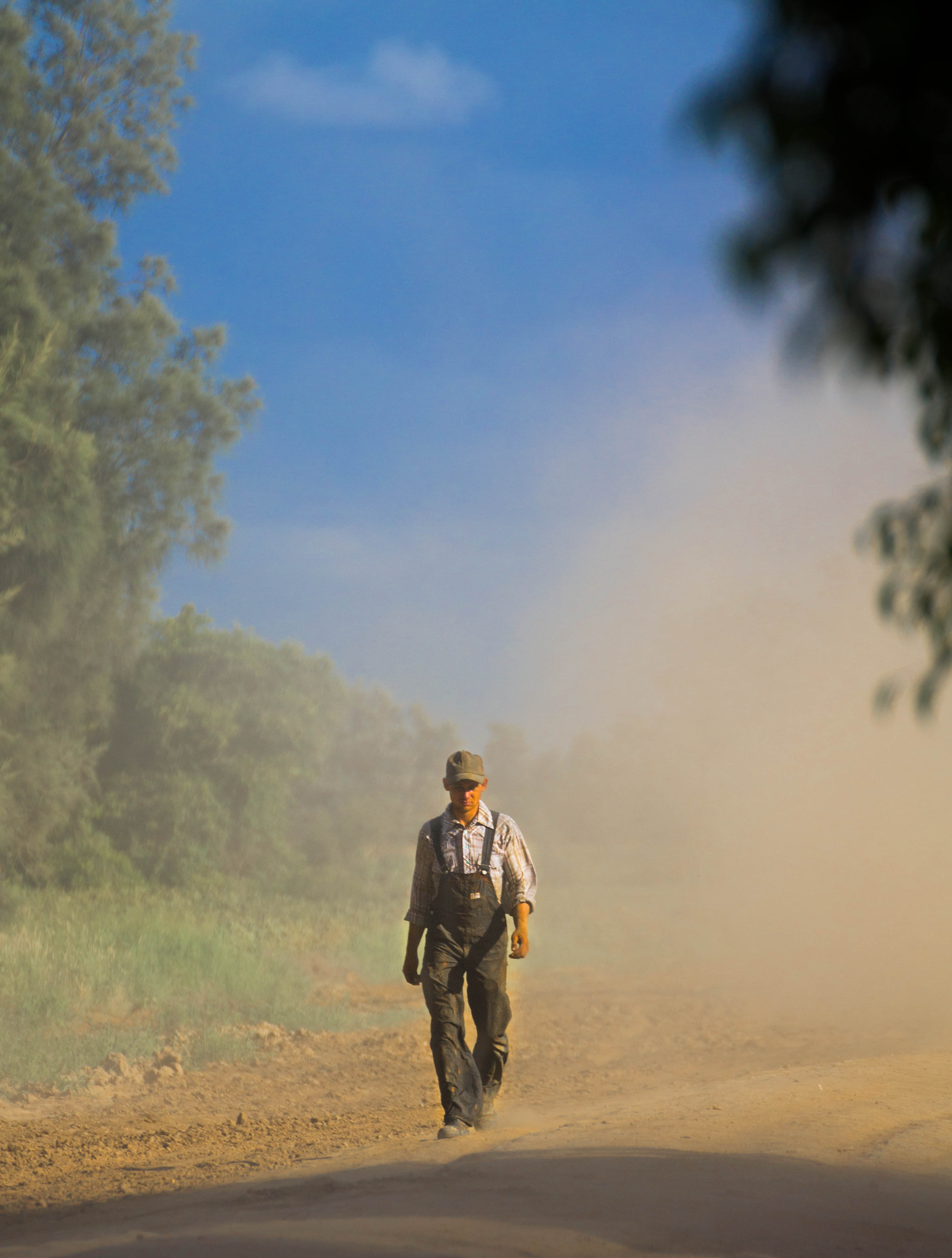
- Mennonite in Colonia del Norte

Total population
- cca. 90,000–150,000 (2023/24)

Regions with significant populations
- Chiquitos, Cordillera, Ñuflo de Chávez and Velasco provinces of the Santa Cruz Department

Religions
- Anabaptism

Languages
- Plautdietsch, Spanish

The Mennonites in Bolivia are among the most traditional and conservative of all Mennonite denominations in the Americas. They are mostly Russian Mennonites of Frisian, Flemish, and Prussian descent. As of 2023, there were about 150,000 Mennonites living in Bolivia.

== History ==
=== Origins ===
In the early-to-mid 16th century, Mennonites began to move from the Low Countries to the Vistula delta region, seeking religious freedom and exemption from military service. There they gradually replaced their Dutch and Frisian languages with the Plautdietsch dialect spoken in the area, blending into it elements of their native tongues. The Mennonites of Dutch origin were joined by Mennonites from other parts of northern Europe.

In 1772, most of Poland Mennonites' land in the Vistula area became part of the Kingdom of Prussia in the first of the Partitions of Poland. Frederick William II of Prussia ascended the throne in 1786 and imposed heavy fees on the Mennonites in exchange for continued military exemption.

=== Earlier migrations ===
In the 1760s Catherine the Great of Russia invited Mennonites from Prussia to settle on land and farm north of the Black Sea in what is modern Ukraine, near Zaporizhia, in exchange for religious freedom and exemption from military service, a precondition founded in their commitment to non-violence. The ancestors of the Bolivian Mennonites settled in the Ukrainian section of the Russian Empire in two main waves in the years 1789 and 1804, leaving Danzig and the Polish Vistula delta because they were being annexed by Prussia. After Russia introduced the general conscription in 1874, many Mennonites migrated to the US and Canada.

In the years after 1873 some 11,000 left the Russian Empire and settled in Manitoba, Canada, and an equal number went to Kansas, Nebraska and Dakota territory. The Russian Mennonites settled in Canada until a universal, secular compulsory education was implemented in 1917 that required the use of the English language, which the more conservative Mennonites saw as a threat to the religious basis of their community.

The more conservative Mennonites from Russia, some 6,000 people, left Canada between 1922 and 1925 and settled in Mexico. Another 1,800 more conservative Mennonites migrated to the Chaco region in Paraguay in 1927. In 1930 and in 1947 the Paraguayian Mennonites were joined by Mennonites coming directly from Russia. In the years after 1958 some 1,700 Mennonites from the Mexican settlements moved to what was then British Honduras and today is Belize.

=== Bolivia ===
The Bolivian government granted a privilege to future Mennonite immigrants including freedom of religion, private schools and exemption from military service in the 1930s, but that was not deployed until the 1950s.

Between 1954 and 1957, a first group of 37 families from various Mennonite colonies in Paraguay established Tres Palmas colony, 25 km northeast of Santa Cruz de la Sierra. Soon, a second colony was established five km away from Tres Palmas by a group of 25 conservative families from Menno Colony in Paraguay. The settlers from Paraguay were experienced and well prepared to practice agriculture in a subtropical climate. In 1959, the total Mennonite population in Bolivia was 189.

In 1963, new settlements were founded where Mennonites from Paraguay and Canada lived together. In 1967, Mennonites from Mexico and from their daughter colonies in Belize began to settle in the Santa Cruz Department. Las Piedras colony, founded 1968, was the first colony founded exclusively by Mennonites from Canada. Most settlers in Bolivia were traditional Mennonites who wanted to separate themselves more from "the world". Altogether there were about 17,500 Mennonites living in 16 colonies in Bolivia by 1986, of whom nearly 15,000 were Old Colony Mennonites and 2,500 Bergthal or Sommerfeld Mennonites.

== Colonies and population ==
Historical population
Year	Pop.	±% p.a.
1959	189	—
1986	17,500	+18.26%
1995	28,567	+5.60%
1997	33,089	+7.62%
2007	49,813	+4.18%
2010	60,000	+6.40%
2013	70,000	+5.27%
2023	150,000	+7.92%
Estimates:

In 1995, there were a total of 25 Mennonite colonies in Bolivia with a total population of 28,567. The most populous ones were Riva Palacios (5,488), Swift Current (2,602), Nueva Esperanza (2,455), Valle Esperanza (2,214) and Santa Rita (1,748). In 2002 there were 40 Mennonite colonies with a population of about 38,000 people. An outreach of Conservative Mennonites can be found at La Estrella, with others in progress.

The total population was estimated at 60,000 by Lisa Wiltse in 2010.

In 2012 there were 23,818 church members in congregations of Russian Mennonites, indicating a total population of about 70,000. Another 1,170 Mennonites were in Spanish-speaking congregations. The number of colonies was 57 in 2011.

Martyna Wojciechowska, a Polish journalist, created a TV documentary about the colony in Santa Rita, as a part of her TV programme Kobieta na krańcu świata, that aired on Polish TV on 1 October 2017. A 2020 survey found that there are more than 200 Mennonite colonies in nine Iberian American countries, with 99 in Bolivia.

The latest census in Bolivia (2024) counted 75,852 German-speaking people (aged 4 and over), though, evasion from participating in government censuses is high within the community. Over 90% of them were living in the Santa Cruz Department, primarily in the provinces of Chiquitos, where 33,299 German-speaking people were counted (32.7% of province's population), Cordillera with 16,138 people (13.2% of population), Velasco with 6,214 people (7.6%), Ñuflo de Chávez with 8,057 (6.8%), German Busch with 1,395 people (3.5%) and Guarayos with 1,507 (2.8%). At the same time, 2,903 people (around 2%) German-speaking people (aged 4 and over) were counted in the Gran Chaco Province of the Tarija Department and 1,280 (1%) in the Cercado Province of the Beni Department.

There were more than 8,000 Mennonites in free communities.

Name	Established	Origin	Population in 1997	Population in 2007
Tres Palmas	1954	Paraguay	-	-
Canadiense 1	1957	Paraguay	402	207
Altbergthal	1963	Canada, Paraguay	-	-
Las Pavas	1963	Paraguay	17	10
Schönthal	1967	Paraguay	-	-
Riva Palacios	1967	Mexico	5,728	5,560
Las Piedras 1	1967	Canada	-	-
Swift Current	1968	Mexico	2,614	2,925
Sommerfeld	1968	Mexico	669	920
Santa Rita	1968	Mexico	1,579	2,010
Nueva Esperanza	1975	Mexico	2,687	3,748
Canadiense 2	1975	Canadiense 1	777	980
Valle Esperanza	1975/6	Mexico	2,318	2,305
Cupesi	1976	Canada, Las Pavas	753	530
Del Norte	1980	Mexico	1,016	1,323
Belice	1981	Mexico	2,139	2,620
Las Piedras 2	1984	Las Piedras 1	1,150	848
Nueva Holanda	1984	Las Pavas	698	824
Neu Bergthal	1986	Belice, Canada, Altbergthal	499	640
Pinondi	1988	Riva Palacios	1,533	2,429
Chihuahua	1989	Bolivia	332	607
Campo León	1991	Bolivia	73	40
Yanahigua	1991/2	Valle Esperanza	723	1,116
Las Palmas	1992	Paraguay, Las Plamas	254	322
Valle Nuevo	1993	Swift Current	1,185	1,699
Manitoba	1993	Riva Palacios	1,825	1,669
Leoncito	1994	Bolivia	11	10
Santa Clara	1994	Sommerfeld	248	456
Durango 1	1994	Paraguay	1,813	2,846
Oriente	1995/6	Santa Rita	651	1,063
Alberta	1996	Canada	167	-
Casas Grandes	1996	Mexico	280	883
El Cerro	1996	Las Piedras 2	-	506
El Dorado	1996	Riva Palacios	298	1,848
El Este	1996	Cupesi	-	-
Fresnillo	1996	Mexico	164	271
Hohenau	1996	Paraguay	336	634
Centro Shalom	1997	Valle Espeeanza	20	37
Del Sur	1997	Mexico	-	1,063
El Tinto	1997	Paraguay	66	823
Florida	1997	Del Norte	8	343
La Luna	1997	Mexico, Bolivia	15	-
Milagrosa	1997	Belize	14	266
Monte Cristo	1997	Canada	9	-
Waldheim	1998	Paraguay	-	243
Villa Cariño	1998	Las Piedras 1	-	227
Buena Vista	1999	Bolivia	-	33
Durango 2	2001	Mexico	-	-
La Sierra	2002	Argentina	-	228
El Palmar	2002	Paraguay	-	292
La Estrella	2002	Canada, Bolivia	-	220
Berlin	2003	N. Esperanza	-	513
Nueva Asención	2004	Valle Nuevo	-	448
IBNIAS (Pailòn)	2004	Bolivia	-	66
Monte Rico	2004	Swift Current	-	384
Neuland	2004	Paraguay	-	384
Nordenheim	2005	S. Rita	-	65
La Honda	2005	Durango 1	-	249
Barrio N. Estrella	2005	Bolivia	-	60
Nueva México	2005	Riva Palacios	-	507
Villa Hermosa	2005	Valle Esperanza	-	270
Villa Nueva (Pailon)	2005	Bolivia	-	207
Schöntal (S. Pablo)	2005	Fresnillo (Chihuahua)	-	105
Rio Nego	2006	Swift Current	-	120
California	2006	Manitoba	-	22
Las Piedras	2006	Belize	-	30
Bajio Verde	2007	Paraguay	-	16
Total			33,089	49,813

Affiliation	Membership in 2009	Membership in 2012
Altkolonier Mennonitengemeinde	14,424	19,096
Canadian Old Colony Mennonites	344	524
Sommerfelder Mennonitengemeinde	2,065	2,157
Bergthaler Mennonitengemeinde	199	557
Reinländer Mennonitengemeinde	147	203
Kleingemeinde	394	682
Conservative (Plain) Mennonites	70	105
La Iglesia Evangélica Anabautista en Bolivia	630	630
Iglesia Evangélica Menonita Boliviana	450	450
Iglesia Misionera Anabaptista		90
Independent colonies	125	494
Total	18,848	24,988

== Rape and sexual assaults ==
In 2011, eight men belonging to the Manitoba Mennonite Colony were convicted of a series of sexual assaults committed from 2005 to 2009. Prior to the discovery, the rapes had been attributed to a ghost or demon. The victims were reported to be between the ages of 3 and 65. The offenders used a type of gas used by veterinarians to sedate animals during medical procedures. Despite long custodial sentences for the convicted men, an investigation in 2013 reported continuing cases of similar assaults and other sexual abuses. Canadian author Miriam Toews has made these crimes the center of her 2018 novel Women Talking.

== Literature ==
- Huttner, Jakob. Zwischen Eigen-art und Wirk-lichkeit: Die Altkolonie-Mennoniten im bolivianischen Chaco. Berlin 2012.
- Schartner, Sieghard and Schartner, Sylvia. Bolivien: Zufluchtsort der konservativen Mennoniten. Asunción 2009.
- Cañás Bottos, Lorenzo. Old Colony Mennonites in Argentina and Bolivia: Nation Making, Religious Conflict and Imagination of the Future. Leiden et al. 2008.
- Hedberg, Anna Sofia. Outside the world: Cohesion and Deviation among Old Colony Mennonites in Bolivia. Uppsala 2007.
- Pasco, Gwenaëlle. La Colonisation Mennonite en Bolivie: Culture et agriculture dans l'Oriente. Paris 1999.
