= Holland, Kentucky =

Unincorporated community in Kentucky, United States

- Unincorporated community
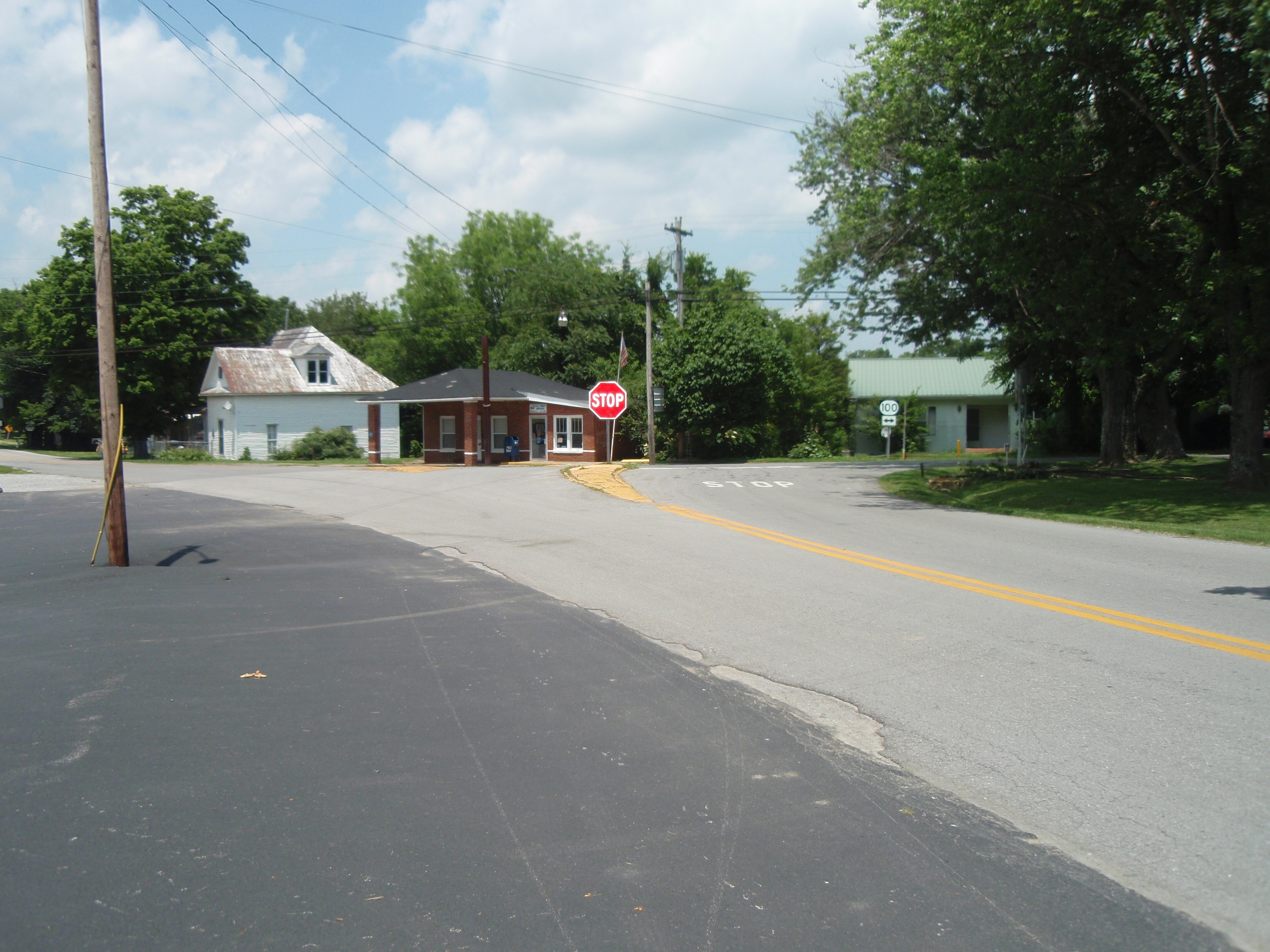
- Intersection of State Route 99 and State Route 100

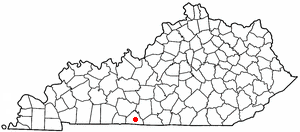
- Coordinates: 36°41′56″N 86°04′06″W
- Country: United States
- State: Kentucky
- County: Allen
- Elevation: 807 ft (246 m)
- Time zone: UTC-6 (Central (CST))
  - Summer (DST): UTC-5 (CDT)
- ZIP codes: 42153
- Area code: 270
- GNIS feature ID: 494393

Holland is an unincorporated community in the southeast corner of Allen County, Kentucky, United States.

== History ==
A post office was established in the community in 1881 and named for early settler, William Holland.

A tornado hit near Holland around 2 AM on Wednesday, February 6, 2008, killing four people and injuring several more. During the 1925 Tri-State tornado outbreak, a strong EF4+ tornado killed four people near Holland.

There is an Old Order Mennonite community in Holland that started as one of the "Christian Communities" founded by Elmo Stoll. Soon after the early death of Elmo Stoll in 1998, the "Christian Communities" began to disband. The community in Holland then decided to join the Noah Hoover Mennonites in nearby Scottsville.

== Geography ==
Holland is located at the intersection of Kentucky Route 99 and Kentucky Route 100, approximately 10 miles east of Scottsville. Tennessee State Route 10 continues north into the community. At Kentucky Route 1333 (Bandy Road), KY 99 veers northwest toward its terminus at KY 100 (Holland Road) in Holland.
