= Manitoba Colony, Mexico =

Mennonite colony in Mexico

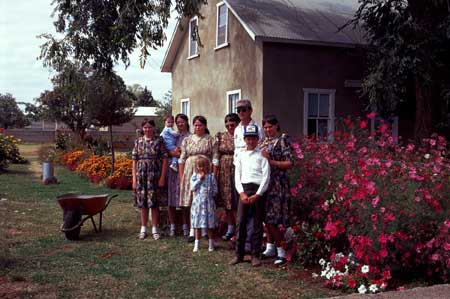
Mennonite family in Chihuahua, Mexico.

Manitoba Colony (Spanish: Colonia de Manitoba) is a large community of Plautdietsch-speaking Mennonites mostly north of Ciudad Cuauhtémoc in the state of Chihuahua in Mexico. It was founded in 1922 by Old Colony Mennonites from Manitoba, Canada, and consisted originally of 47 villages. It is the largest and oldest Mennonite colony in Mexico.

In 1926, the Manitoba settlement consisted of 3,340 persons; in 1949, the number had grown to 7,706; and in 1953, the number was 8,768. In 1987, the total population of the Manitoba settlement was around 12,500 persons and 17,000 in 2006.

Adjacent to Manitoba Colony is Swift Current Colony. Further to the north are the Ojo de la Yegua Colony (Nordkolonie), Santa Rita Colony, and Santa Clara Colony. West of Santa Rita Colony is Los Jagueyes Colony (Quellenkolonie). Altogether these Mennonite colonies stretch over 100 km and have some 50,000 Mennonite residents (2015).
