= Barton Creek Cave =

Cave in Belize

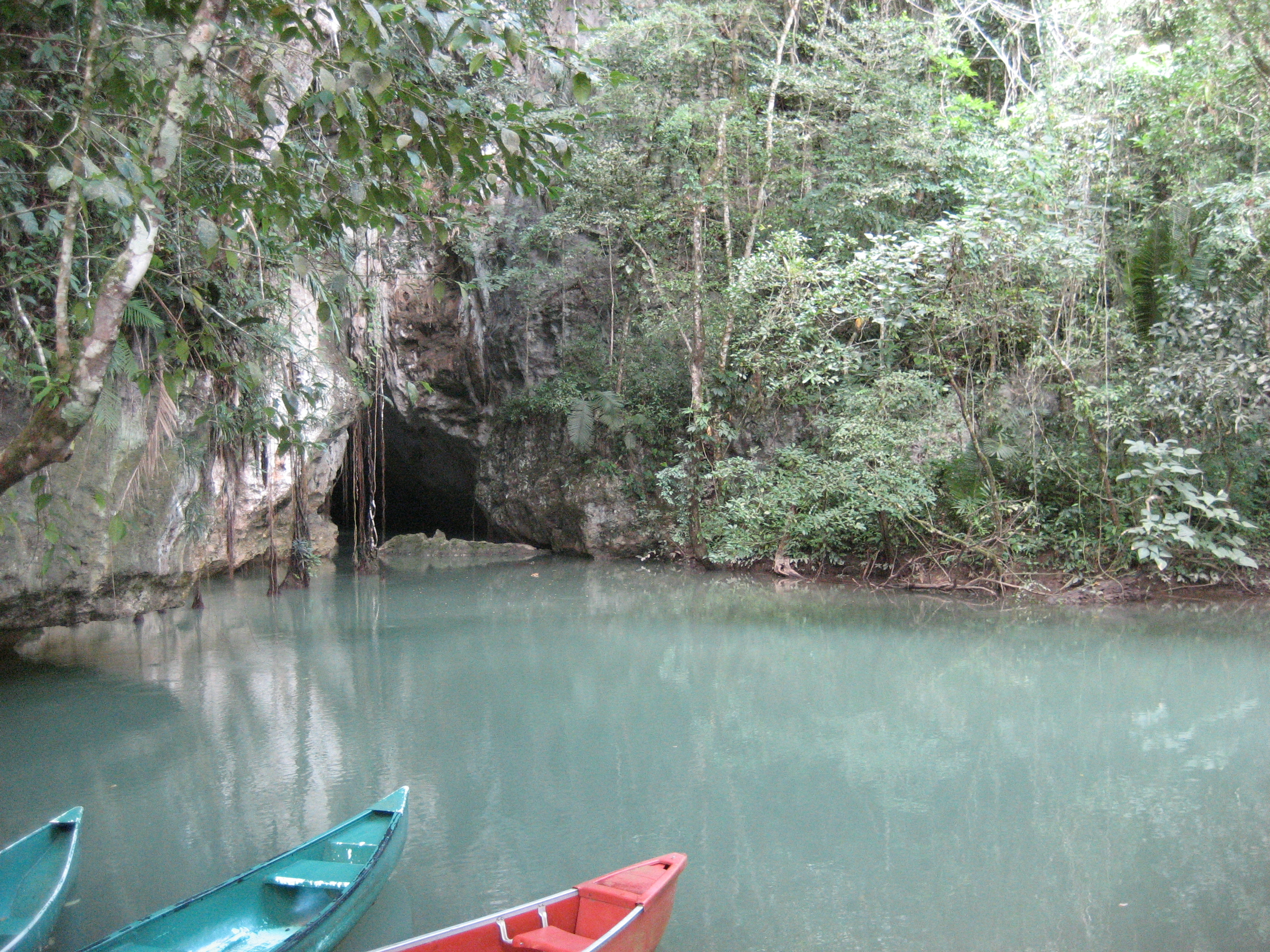
- Barton Creek Cave

- location in Belize
- 17°6′46″N 88°55′41″W
- Location: Barton Creek, near San Ignacio, Cayo District
- Region: Belize

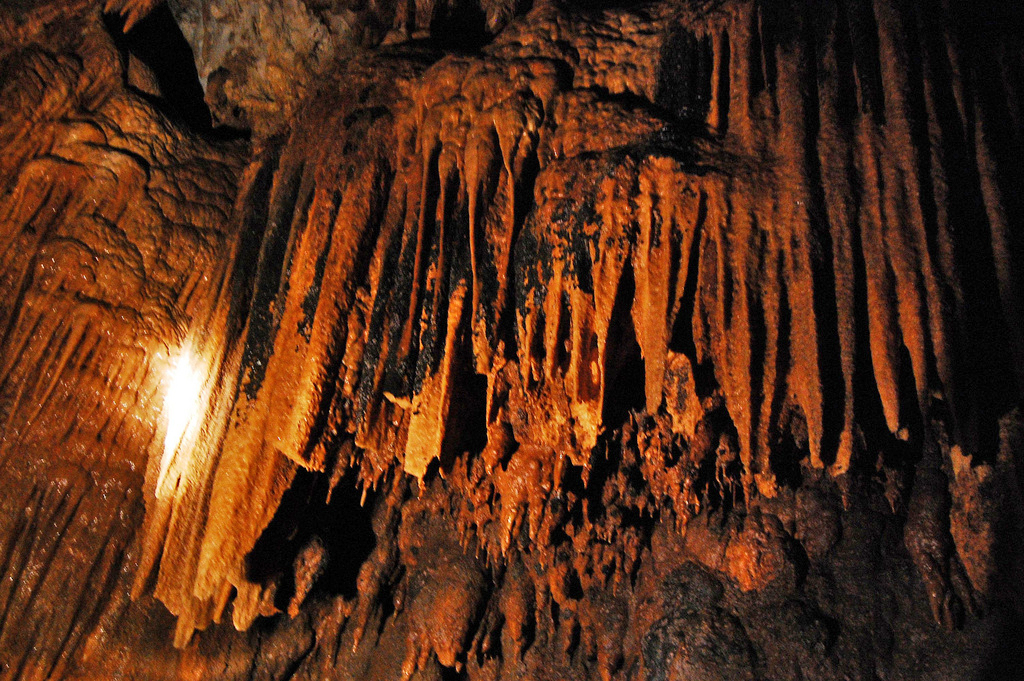
Cave interior

Barton Creek Cave is a natural cave in Belize, known as both an archaeological site and as a tourist destination. It is located in the upper Barton Creek area near San Ignacio in the Cayo District.

== Description ==
Barton Creek Cave is a primarily single-passage resurging stream cave. By 2002 a cave survey had been completed by the Western Belize Regional Cave Project, recording a total of 6,400 m (21,000 ft) of passages; dye traces at sinking streams above the cave indicated that there could be a further 6 km (3.7 mi) of cave passages beyond the terminal sumps. By 2005 the Xibalba Mapping and Exploration Team had extended the survey to 8 km (5.0 mi).

== Archaeology ==
In the early 1970s, several Mennonites from the nearby Mennonite community floated a short distance into Barton Creek Cave on oil drums. They found human bones not far from the cave entrance. On May 9, 1974, two Peace Corps Volunteers working for Belize's Dept. of Archaeology as experienced cave explorers (Barbara MacLeod and CarolJo Rushin) entered the cave accompanied by a local farmer (American expat Patrick Cartwright). The trio paddled over a mile into the cave, finding artifacts but not the human bones discovered by the Mennonites. The following day, MacLeod, Rushin and Cartwright explored two nearby caves, accompanied by three Mennonites. One cave contained Maya potsherds and artificially constructed seats or altars. The other cave contained an artificial rock pile mixed with Maya potsherds.

Extensive looting of artifacts occurred soon after the cave was first reported, but it remains an important site for archaeologists. Evidence of cave use by the Maya exists on ten ledges within the first kilometer of cave passage. Pottery sherds indicate use between the Early Classic (200 to 600 CE) to the Late Classic (600 to 900 CE) periods. The remains of at least 28 humans have been found within the cave.
