= Manitoba Colony =

Manitoba Colony may refer to:

- Manitoba Colony, Bolivia
- Manitoba Colony, Mexico
