= Belize Evangelical Mennonite Church =

Belize Evangelical Mennonite Church is a church denomination of the Fellowship of Evangelical Bible Churches in Belize.

== History ==
Anabaptist-Mennonite groups began arriving in Belize in the 1950s from Mexico, Canada, and the United States. Hurricane Hattie, which hit Belize hard in 1961, prompted the arrival of numerous Mennonite agencies to provide disaster relief, notably the Beachy Amish Mennonite and the Eastern Mennonite Board of Missions and Charities. In 1964, missionaries Paul and Ella Martin arrived in Belize and, in 1969, the Mennonite Central Committee established the Mennonite Center in Belize City to govern the Mennonite agricultural colonies in the country. The Belize Evangelical Church was formally established in 1973. By 1978, the Belize Evangelical Mennonite Church was established, and there were several dozen colonies in the country, made up mostly of Old Colony Mennonites (Rhinelanders) and Kleingmeinde Mennonites ("The Little Brotherhood"), and had five congregations and 122 communicant members, including Creoles, Garifuna, Maya, and Mestizos. The Mennonite Central Committee and Mission and Eastern Mennonite Missions who started service in Belize in 1960s were responsible for initiation of the service activities of this church Mennonites were first initiated as their knowledge of German was poor and later Belizeans were also initiated into the service. In 1981, the church has grown to 10 congregations and 425 members. By 2003, there were 425 members and 13 congregations.

The Mennonite colonists in Belize made an agreement with the authorities to promote education, agriculture and their beliefs. By 1978, they operated 39 primary schools and two secondary schools. In addition, they cultivated some 5,000 acres, concentrated in Orange Walk District and Cayo District, providing Belize with an influx of dairy products and vegetables.

== Services ==
The church's services are held in English (official language of Belize), Spanish and Garifuna, or a mixture of these languages. The Jesus Deaf Church, an ecumenical Christian church, is affiliated with the Belize Evangelical Mennonite Church, offering services that are led by a deaf pastor.

In Belmopan, an Evangelical Bible church is located at 3840 Ambergris Avenue.

== Affiliations ==
Within the Caribbean community, the Belize Evangelical Mennonite Church is affiliated with Cuba's Brethren in Christ Missionary Society; the Dominican Republic's Divine Light Mennonite National Council and the Evangelical Mennonite Conference; the Jamaica Mennonite Church; and the Mennonite Church of Trinidad and Tobago.

== See also ==
- Mennonites in Belize
