= Demographics of Belize =

- Population pyramid of Belize in 2022
- Population: 397,483 (2022 census)
- Growth rate: 1.64% (2022 est.)
- Birth rate: 21.28 births/1,000 population (2022 est.)
- Death rate: 3.94 deaths/1,000 population (2022 est.)
- Life expectancy: 75.82 years
  - male: 74.23 years
  - female: 77.5 years
- Fertility rate: 2.62 children born/woman (2022 est.)
- Infant mortality: 11.15 deaths/1,000 live births
- Net migration rate: -0.96 migrant(s)/1,000 population (2022 est.)
- Immigrant share: 16.5% (2024)

Age structure
- 0–14 years: 32.57%
- 65 and over: 4.53%

Sex ratio
- Total: 1 male(s)/female (2022 est.)
- At birth: 1.05 male(s)/female
- Under 15: 1.04 male(s)/female
- 65 and over: 0.78 male(s)/female

Nationality
- Nationality: Belizean
- Major ethnic: Mestizo (52.9%)
- Minor ethnic: Creole (25.9%)

Language
- Official: English
- Spoken: Spanish, Kriol

Demographics of the population of Belize include population density, ethnicity, education level, health of the populace, economic status, religious affiliations and other aspects.

Belize is the most sparsely populated nation in Central America. It is larger than El Salvador. Slightly more than half of the people live in rural areas. About one-fourth live in Belize City, the principal port, commercial centre, and former capital. About 80% of the population are Christian.

Most Belizeans are of multiracial descent. About 52.9% of the population is of mixed Indigenous (mostly Maya) and European descent (or Mestizo), 24.9% are Kriols, about 10.6% are Maya, and about 6.1% are Afro-Amerindian (Garifuna). The remaining population includes European, East Indian, Chinese, Middle Eastern, and North American groups. In the case of Europeans, most are descendants of Spanish and British colonial settlers, whether pure-blooded or mixed with each other. Most Spanish left the nation just after it was taken by the British colonists who, in the same way, left after independence. Dutch and Prussian Mennonites settled in Belize, mostly in isolated areas.

== Population size and structure ==
According to the Statistical Institute of Belize, the estimated mid 2022 population stood at 441,471.

In conjunction with a census of the British Empire, census data was compiled for Belize in 1790, 1816, 1823, 1826, 1829, 1832, 1835, 1861, 1871, 1881, 1891, 1901, 1911, 1921, 1931 and 1946. Belize conducted its own censuses in 1960, 1970, 1980, 1991, 2000, 2010, and 2022.

Historical population

Year	Pop.	±% p.a.
1790	2,493	—
1816	3,824	+1.66%
1823	4,107	+1.03%
1826	5,653	+11.24%
1829	4,235	−9.18%
1832	4,537	+2.32%
1835	2,543	−17.55%
1861	25,635	+9.29%

Year	Pop.	±% p.a.
1871	24,710	−0.37%
1881	27,452	+1.06%
1891	31,471	+1.38%
1901	37,479	+1.76%
1911	40,458	+0.77%
1921	45,317	+1.14%
1931	51,347	+1.26%
1946	59,220	+0.96%

Year	Pop.	±% p.a.
1960	90,505	+3.08%
1970	119,934	+2.86%
1980	145,353	+1.94%
1991	189,393	+2.44%
2000	248,916	+3.08%
2010	322,441	+2.62%
2022	397,483	+1.76%

Source: "A Historical Recollection - Belize Population Censuses: 1816–2010", Statistical Institute of Belize.

=== Structure of the population ===
Structure of the population (01.07.2017) (Estimates)

Age group	Male	Female	Total	%
Total	193 942	193 937	387 879	100
0-4	23 163	22 116	45 330	11.69
5-9	23 771	23 424	47 195	12.17
10-14	22 693	22 659	45 352	11.69
15-19	20 850	20 831	41 681	10.75
20-24	18 046	18 695	36 741	9.47
25-29	15 427	16 458	31 885	8.22
30-34	13 335	14 137	27 472	7.08
35-39	12 144	12 732	24 876	6.41
40-44	10 367	10 495	20 862	5.38
45-49	9 187	8 802	17 989	4,64
50-54	7 152	6 949	14 101	3.64
55-59	5 416	4 976	10 392	2.68
60-64	3 957	3 527	7 484	1.93
65-69	2 814	2 474	5 288	1.36
70-74	2 230	1 975	4 205	1.08
75-79	1 564	1 518	3 082	0.79
80+	1 776	1 994	3 770	0.97
Age group	Male	Female	Total	Percent
0-14	62 824	61 649	124 473	35.59
15-64	104 484	106 035	210 519	60.20
65+	7 557	7 179	14 736	4.21

Population Estimates by Sex and Age Group (01.VII.2021):

Age group	Male	Female	Total	%
Total	215 099	215 092	430 191	100
0–4	25 746	24 724	50 470	11.73
5–9	26 363	25 979	52 342	12.17
10–14	25 169	25 130	50 299	11.69
15–19	23 124	23 103	46 227	10.75
20–24	20 014	20 734	40 748	9.47
25–29	17 112	18 253	35 365	8.22
30–34	14 788	15 681	30 469	7.09
35–39	13 469	14 119	27 588	6.41
40–44	11 497	11 641	23 138	5.38
45–49	10 189	9 760	19 949	4.64
50–54	7 934	7 708	15 642	3.64
55–59	6 005	5 519	11 524	2.68
60–64	4 390	3 912	8 302	1.93
65-69	3 121	2 744	5 865	1.36
70-74	2 473	2 190	4 663	1.08
75-79	1 735	1 684	3 419	0.79
80+	1 970	2 211	4 181	0.97
Age group	Male	Female	Total	Percent
0–14	77 278	75 833	153 111	35.59
15–64	128 522	130 430	258 952	60.19
65+	9 299	8 829	18 128	4.21

View source data.
View source data.

=== Belize's largest cities and towns by population ===
1. Belize City, BZ - 67,169
2. San Ignacio, CY - 27,878
3. Belmopan, CY - 19,931
4. Orange Walk Town, OW - 16,709
5. Corozal Town, CZ - 13,400
6. San Pedro, BZ - 11,765
7. Dangriga, SC - 9,591
8. Benque Viejo del Carmen, CY - 6,148
9. Punta Gorda, TO - 6,351

- Based on 2010 census.

== Vital statistics ==
View source data.

	Average population	Live births	Deaths	Natural change	Crude birth rate (per 1000)	Crude death rate (per 1000)	Natural change (per 1000)	Total fertility rate	Infant mortality rate
1934	52,000	1,945	971	974	37.4	18.7	18.7		
1935	53,000	2,081	1,377	704	39.3	26.0	13.3		
1936	53,000	1,879	1,256	623	35.5	23.7	11.8		
1937	54,000	1,876	1,054	822	34.7	19.5	15.2		
1938	54,000	2,052	1,178	874	38.0	21.8	16.2		
1939	55,000	2,084	1,092	992	37.9	19.9	18.0		
1940	56,000	2,192	986	1,206	39.1	17.6	21.5		
1941	57,000	2,133	1,030	1,103	37.4	18.1	19.4		
1942	57,000	1,905	1,250	655	33.4	21.9	11.5		
1943	58,000	1,925	1,136	789	33.2	19.6	13.6		
1944	58,000	2,031	1,153	878	35.0	19.9	15.1		
1945	59,000	2,141	1,204	937	36.3	20.4	15.9		
1946	59,000	2,065	1,019	1,046	35.0	17.3	17.7		
1947	61,000	2,473	1,049	1,424	40.5	17.2	23.3		
1948	63,000	2,506	861	1,645	39.8	13.7	26.1		
1949	65,000	2,548	877	1,671	39.2	13.5	25.7		
1950	69,000	2,657	845	1,812	39.7	12.6	27.0		
1951	71,000	2,905	801	2,104	42.1	11.6	30.5		
1952	73,000	3,028	794	2,234	42.1	11.0	31.0		
1953	76,000	2,986	820	2,166	40.4	11.1	29.3		
1954	78,000	3,231	876	2,355	42.5	11.5	31.0		
1955	80,000	3,463	858	2,605	44.4	11.0	33.4		
1956	82,000	3,725	821	2,904	46.0	10.1	35.9		
1957	85,000	3,615	932	2,683	43.6	11.2	32.3		
1958	87,000	3,988	795	3,193	46.4	9.2	37.1		
1959	89,000	4,016	730	3,286	45.6	8.3	37.3		
1960	92,000	4,091	717	3,374	45.0	7.9	37.1		
1961	95,000	4,244	708	3,536	45.6	7.6	38.0		
1962	97,000	4,461	853	3,608	47.0	9.0	38.0		
1963	100,000	4,783	712	4,071	48.8	7.3	41.5		
1964	103,000	4,568	729	3,839	45.2	7.2	38.0		
1965	106,000	4,637	710	3,927	44.6	6.8	37.8		
1966	109,000	4,898	776	4,122	45.8	7.3	38.5		
1967	113,000	4,851	811	4,040	43.7	7.3	36.4	5.838	
1968	116,000	4,671	714	3,957	41.0	6.3	34.7		
1969	119,000	4,660	783	3,877	39.8	6.7	33.1		
1970	122,000	4,455	813	3,642	37.1	6.8	30.4	6.276	51.2
1971	125,000	5,052	625	4,427	41.4	5.1	36.3		30.9
1972	127,000	4,954	669	4,285	40.0	5.4	34.6		34.0
1973	129,000	5,010	801	4,303	39.8	6.4	34.2		41.7
1974	131,000	5,039	721	4,379	39.4	5.6	34.2		42.5
1975	133,000	5,201	800	4,401	40.0	6.2	33.9	5.769	42.6
1976	135,000	5,340	881	4,459	40.2	6.6	33.5		45.1
1977	137,000	5,570	767	4,803	41.0	5.6	35.3		40.0
1978	139,000	5,384	885	4,499	38.7	6.4	32.4		39.9
1979	141,000	5,523	710	4,813	38.9	5.0	33.9		37.8
1980	144,000	6,264	717	5,547	43.2	4.9	38.3	5.883	30.2
1981	148,000	5,821	709	5,112	39.1	4.8	34.3	5.771	27.5
1982	151,000	5,899	663	5,236	38.6	4.3	34.3	5.494	22.9
1983	156,000	6,044	724	5,320	38.2	4.6	33.6	5.290	23.2
1984	160,000	5,756	750	5,006	38.0	4.9	33.0	5.150	26.2
1985	166,213	5,916	693	5,223	35.6	4.2	31.5	4.920	20.6
1986	170,382	6,136	688	5,448	36.2	4.1	32.1	5.040	23.1
1987	175,153	6,121	675	5,446	35.1	3.9	31.3	5.400	20.1
1988	179,814	6,325	708	5,617	35.4	4.0	31.4	4.958	20.2
1989	183,200	6,686	762	5,924	36.5	4.2	32.3	5.181	19.4
1990	189,000	7,200	819	6,381	38.4	4.4	34.0	5.477	10.6
1991	194,000	6,555	842	5,713	34.3	4.4	29.9	4.109	14.3
1992	199,000	7,597	846	6,751	39.0	4.3	34.6	4.918	11.5
1993	205,000	6,462	935	5,527	32.6	4.7	27.9	3.205	19.3
1994	211,000	5,887	944	4,943	29.1	4.7	24.4	3.580	19.4
1995	216,500	6,623	931	5,692	32.0	4.5	27.5	4.009	14.9
1996	222,000	6,678	964	5,714	31.4	4.5	26.9	3.896	26.0
1997	230,000	7,348	1,173	6,175	33.6	5.4	28.3	4.189	24.0
1998	238,500	6,844	1,350	5,494	30.4	6.0	24.4	3.671	21.5
1999	243,055	7,113	1,190	5,923	30.7	5.1	25.5		12.6
2000	249,765	7,313	1,534	5,779	30.7	6.4	24.2		21.2
2001	256,089	7,215	1,261	5,954	29.4	5.1	24.3	3.468	16.6
2002	262,623	7,553	1,284	6,269	30.0	5.1	24.9	3.537	19.2
2003	269,379	7,440	1,277	6,163	28.8	4.9	23.9	3.386	16.0
2004	276,381	8,083	1,298	6,785	30.5	4.9	25.6	3.557	14.1
2005	283,601	8,396	1,369	7,027	29.6	4.8	24.8	3.571	18.4
2006	291,070	7,171	1,396	5,775	24.6	4.8	19.8	2.995	19.6
2007	298,792	7,036	1,389	5,647	23.5	4.6	18.9	2.865	17.2
2008	306,809	7,126	1,302	5,824	23.2	4.2	19.0	2.800	12.0
2009	315,082	7,417	1,453	5,964	23.5	4.6	18.8	3.010	18.9
2010	323,598	7,228	1,554	5,674	22.3	4.8	17.5	2.580	13.6
2011	328,375	7,217	1,554	5,663	21.7	4.8	16.9	2.500	16.5
2012	334,158	7,281	1,650	5,631	21.4	4.8	16.6	2.414	15.9
2013	341,655	7,246	1,637	5,609	20.7	4.7	16.0	2.402	17.4
2014	349,169	7,311	1,620	5,691	20.4	4.6	15.8	2.370	12.3
2015	356,705	7,449	1,772	5,677	20.2	4.9	15.3	2.366	17.2
2016	364,118	7,221	1,805	5,416	19.1	4.8	14.3	2.230	14.1
2017	371,352	7,238	1,872	5,366	18.7	5.0	13.7	2.181	14.5
2018	378,770	7,723	1,886	5,837	19.4	4.8	13.6	2.294	12.3
2019	386,121	7,287	1,994	5,293	17.8	4.9	12.9	2.123	15.0
2020	392,997	7,016	2,173	4,843	16.7	5.2	11.5	2.021	12.0
2021	399,373	6,654	2,504	4,150	15.5	5.8	9.7	1.879	12.6
2022	397,484	7,039	2,300	4,739	15.9	5.2	10.5	2.036	15.5
2023	404,198	6,337	2,297	4,040	15.7	5.7	10.0	1.807	15.1
2024	410,919	5,802	2,327	3,475	14.1	5.7	8.4	1.625	17.4
2025	417,634	6,009	2,125	3,884	14.5	5.1	9.4		

Birth Rate per 1,000 population by Ethnic Groups (2000 Census)

Ethnic Group	Population (2000)	Birth Rate (1999)	Births
African	582	17.18	10
British	1,758	9.10	16
Chinese	1,716	19.23	33
Creole	57,859	28.88	1,671
East Indian	6,868	27.66	190
Garifuna	14,061	27.17	382
Q'eqchi'	12,366	44.88	555
Mopan	8,980	35.30	317
Yucatec	3,155	19.33	61
Mennonite	8,276	42.53	352
Mestizo	78,537	29.73	2,335
Spanish	34,508	32.22	1,112
Other	2,610	21.84	57
Not Available	835	45.51	38
Total	232,111	30.71	7,128

=== Life expectancy at birth ===
Period	Life expectancy in Years	Period	Life expectancy in Years
1950–1955	55.9	1985–1990	71.5
1955–1960	58.6	1990–1995	70.6
1960–1965	61.3	1995–2000	68.6
1965–1970	64.3	2000–2005	68.5
1970–1975	66.7	2005–2010	69.5
1975–1980	68.6	2010–2015	69.8
1980–1985	70.4		

Source: UN World Population Prospects

== Ethnic groups ==
Most Belizeans are of multiracial descent. About 52.9% are Mestizo, 25.9% are Creole, 11.3% Maya, 6.1.% Garifuna, 3.9% East Indian, 3.6% Mennonites, 1.2% White, 1% Asian, 1.2% Other and 0.3% Unknown.

=== Maya ===
Because Belize's original Maya peoples were decimated by disease and wars or fled to Mexico and Guatemala, most of the country's Maya today are descended from other groups. The current Maya population consists mainly of three language groups.

The Yucatec fled to Belize in the late 1840s to escape the Caste War in Yucatán, Mexico. Their descendants live in the Orange Walk and Corozal districts, which border on Mexico. Before the massive migration of Yucatec Maya from Mexico to Belize, a local Yucatec Maya group named the Iciache Maya already inhabited the land. Today most Yucatec Maya work in the sugar cane industry.

In the 1870s-1880s, many Q'eqchi' fled from Alta Verapaz, Guatemala, where their communal land were seized for coffee plantations, where they were forced into service. They settled villages in the Toledo district. Living near rivers and streams, they are primarily farmers, though many younger people now work in tourism, and on shrimp, banana and citrus plantations.

The Mopans originated in Belize, but most were driven out to Guatemala after the British displaced Spanish in a struggle that took most of the 18th century. They returned to Belize in 1886, running from enslavement and taxation in Petén. The Cayo district and San Antonio in the Toledo district are their homes now.

Q'eqchi' and Mopan have intermarried, though the two languages remain distinct and mutually unintelligible. Mopan and Yucatec are mutually intelligible.

Population of Belize according to ethnic group
Ethnic group	Census 1946		Census 1991		Census 2000		Census 2010		Census 2022	
Ethnic group	Number	%	Number	%	Number	%	Number	%	Number	%
Q'eqchi' Maya	10,030	16.9	7,954	4.3	12,366	5.3	17,409	5.8	26,230	6.6
Mopan Maya	10,030	16.9	6,770	3.7	8,980	3.9	10,557	3.5	15,932	4.0
Yucatec/other Maya	10,030	16.9	5,686	3.1	3,155	1.4	2,141	0.7	2,160	0.5
Mestizo	18,360	31.0	80,477	43.6	113,045	48.7	150,921	49.7	205,646	51.7
Creole	22,693	38.3	55,051	29.8	57,859	24.9	63,057	20.8	100,111	25.2
Black African	22,693	38.3	55,051	29.8	582	0.3	1,151	0.4		
Europeans * German (Mennonite) * British (Anglo-Celtic)	2,329	3.9	7,257; 5,763; 1,494	3.9; 3.1; 0.8	10,034; 8,276; 1,758	4.3; 3.6; 0.8	13,964; 10,865; 3,099	4.6; 3.6; 1.0	18,154; 15,249; 2,905	4.6; 3.8; 0.7
Garifuna	4,112	6.9	12,274	6.6	14,061	6.1	13,985	4.6	15,845	4.0
East Indian/Hindu	1,366	2.3	6,455	3.5	6,868	3.0	7,073	2.3	6,712	1.7
Chinese/Asians	50	0.1	747	0.4	1,716	0.7	2,823	0.9	1,344	0.3
Mixed							18,947	6.2		
Syrian/Lebanese	128	0.2	167	0.1			240	0.1		
Other			1,867	1.0	2,610	1.1	762	0.3	2,263	0.6
Unknown	152	0.3	17	0.0	835	0.4	392	0.1	3,086	0.8
Total	59,220		184,722		232,111		303,422		397,483	

== Languages ==
English is the only official language of Belize. It is the main language used in government and education. Although only 5.6% of the population speaks it as the main language at home, 54% can speak it very well, and another 26% can speak some English. 37% of Belizeans consider their primary language to be Kriol, an English-based creole of words and syntax from various African languages (namely Akan, Igbo, and Twi), and other languages (Miskito).

Kriol shares similarities with many Caribbean English Creoles as far as phonology and pronunciations are concerned. Also, many of its words and structures are both lexically and phonologically similar to English, its superstrate language. Because it is English-based, all Kriol speakers can understand English. A number of linguists classify Belizean Kriol as a separate language, while others consider it to be a dialect of English.

Spanish is the mother tongue of Mestizo and Central American refugees and is commonly spoken at home by 56.6% to 68.8% of the population. Maya dialects such as Q'eqchi', Mopan and Yucatec are spoken. Garifuna (which is Arawakan/Maipurean based, with elements of the Carib language, French, and Spanish) and the Plautdietsch and Pennsylvania German dialects of the Mennonites are spoken as well. Literacy currently stands at nearly 80%. In 2001, UNESCO declared the Garifuna language, dance, and music a "Masterpiece of the Oral and Intangible Heritage of Humanity". English is the primary language of public education, with Spanish taught in primary and secondary school as well. Bilingualism is highly encouraged, and therefore, very common.

English & Spanish Language Proficiency
Language	Speaks Very Well	Speaks Some	Total
English	54%	26%	80%
Spanish	52%	11%	63%

Languages in Belize
Language	Percentage
English	62.9%
Spanish	56.6%
Creole	44.6%
Maya	10.5%
German	3.2%
Garifuna	2.9%
Other	1.8%
unknown	0.3%
none (cannot speak)	0.2%

== Religion ==
According to the 2010 census Catholics constitute 40.1% of the population of Belize, down from 49.6% in 2000 and 57.7% in 1991; Protestants constitute 31.7% of the population, with a slight growth in percentage for some groups since 2000 (8.5% Pentecostal; 5.5% Adventist; 4.6% Anglican; 3.8% Mennonite; 3.6% Baptist; 2.9% Methodist; 2.8% Nazarene); Jehovah's Witnesses are 1.7% of the population. 10.2% of Belizeans follow other religions (with a growth in percentage since 2000); amongst these there are followers of the indigenous Maya religion, Garifuna religion, Obeah and Myalism, and minorities of Mormons, Hindus, Buddhists, Muslims, Baháʼís, Rastafarians and other. The Mennonites, of German descent, live mostly in the rural districts of Cayo and Orange Walk. 15.6% of the Belizean population do not adhere to any religion, up from 9.4% in 2000.

Belizean Roman Catholic churches belong to the Diocese of Belize City-Belmopan; Anglican churches belong to the Diocese of Belize, part of the Church in the Province of the West Indies. Hinduism is followed by most Indian immigrants, while Islam is common among Middle Eastern immigrants and has gained a following among some Kriols. Catholics frequently visit the country for special gospel revivals. The Greek Orthodox Church has a presence in Santa Elena.

The Constitution of Belize provides for freedom of religion, and other laws and policies contribute to the generally free practice of religion. The Government at all levels protects this right in full against abuse, either by governmental or private actors. The Government generally respects religious freedom in practice. In 2008, the U.S. government received no reports of societal abuses or discrimination based on religious affiliation, belief, or practice.

Religions in Belize
Religion	Percentage
Catholic	40.1%
Protestant	31.5%
Pentecostal	8.4%
Seventh-day Adventist	5.4%
Anglican	4.7%,
Mennonite	3.7%
Baptist	3.6%
Methodist	2.9%
Nazarene	2.8%
Jehovah's Witness	1.7%
Other (includes Baháʼí, Buddhist, Hindu, Mormon, Islam, Rastafarian)	10.5%
Unknown	0.6%
None	15.5%

== See also ==
- Kriols
- Garifuna people
- Maya peoples
- Mennonites in Belize
- Indians in Belize
- Ethnic groups in Central America
