= Country Foods =

Belize food company

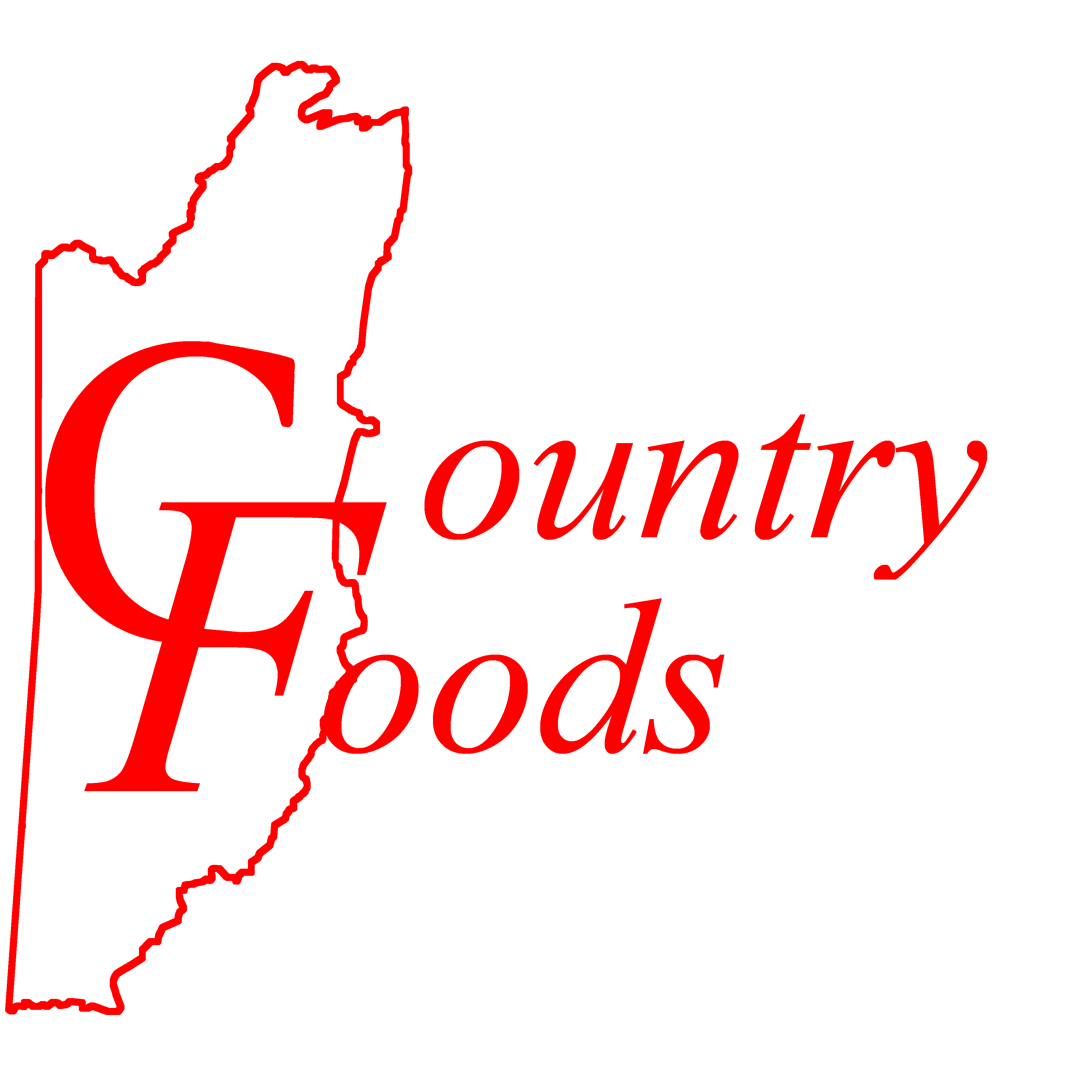
- Industry: Egg supplier
- Predecessor: Farmers Trading Center
- Founded: 1997
- Founder: Spanish Lookout Community
- Headquarters: Route 30 East, Spanish Lookout, Belize
- Area served: Belize
- Key people: Ervin Plett
- Products: Eggs, Rice, Beans, Corn, Maseca
- Brands: Country Rice
- Owner: Spanish Lookout Community
- Number of employees: 31
- Website: countryfoods.bz

Country Foods is Belize's main supplier of eggs. It is located in the heart of Spanish Lookout. Country Foods has eight delivery trucks, delivering eggs, rice, beans, corn and maseca countrywide.

== History ==
In 1958 the Mennonites moved to Belize from Mexico, searching a country of freedom. Not long after that, they started raising hens and marketing eggs countrywide. At first they sold the eggs at Farmers Trading Center but in 1997 they split up and started a separate company, Country Foods.

In 2014 the disease locally referred to as AI (Avian Influenza) invaded the country and thousands of hens were infected and subsequently slaughtered, raising the egg prices to all time highs.

On a windy day at 15:00 on February 10, 2016, an employee lit the trash near the building. The flames rose high into the air and the breeze carried sparks into the building alighting on paper trays, igniting a huge flame. The Spanish Lookout Fire Department and BNE water trucks battled the flames until nightfall. By the time the fire was contained the entire warehouse and its contents had been burnt and destroyed.
