= Barton Creek (Belize) =

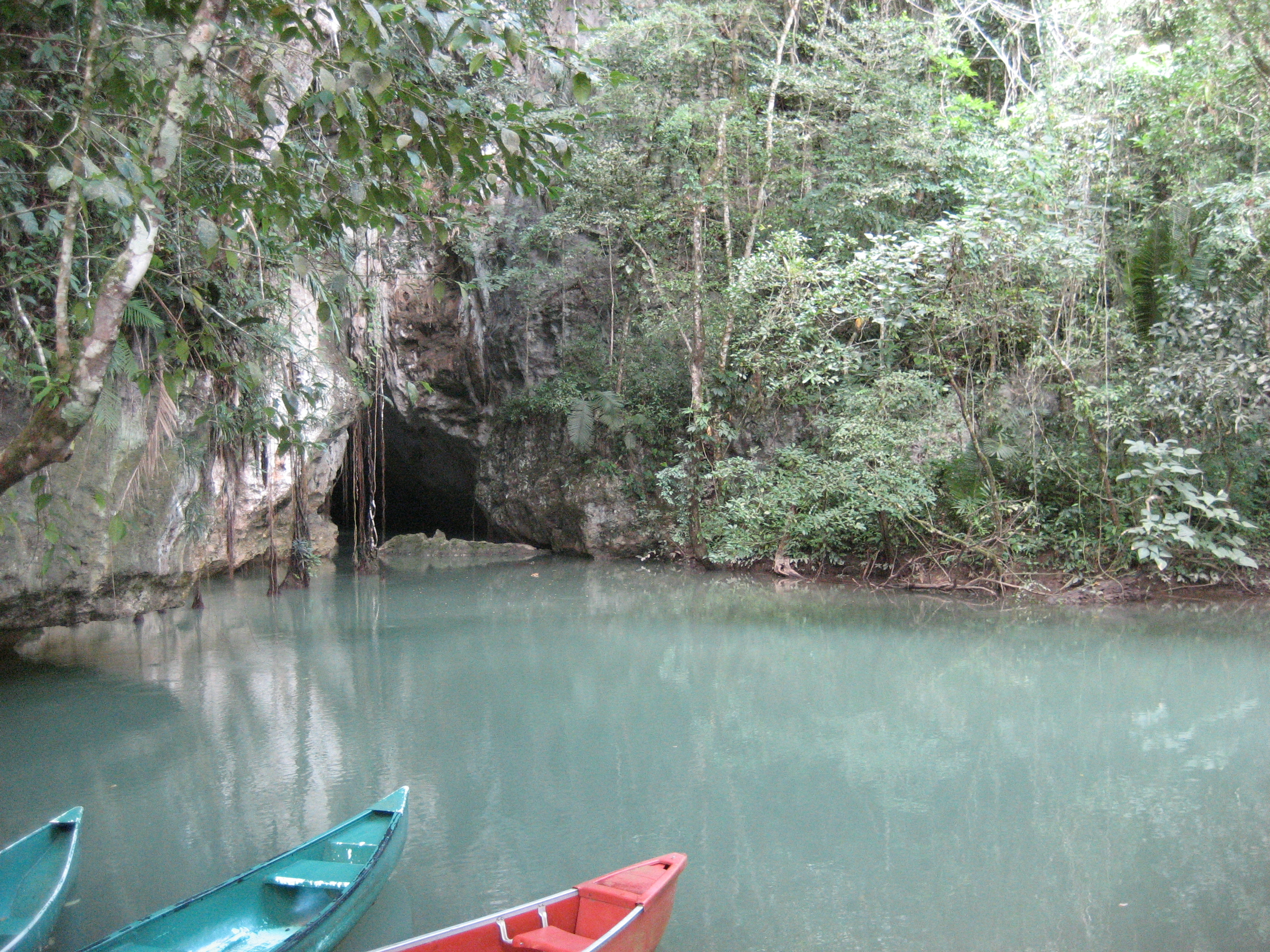
- Mayan Cave in Barton Creek

- Location of mouth

Location
- Country: Belize
- District: Cayo District

Physical characteristics
- Mouth
  - coordinates: 17°13′N 88°57′W

Basin features
- River system: Belize River

Barton Creek is the name of a small river and the area it flows through in Cayo District, Belize. The river is a right tributary of Belize River. In the area with this name there are two Mennonite settlements: Lower and Upper Barton Creek. Both are settlements of very conservative Mennonites in Belize. Barton Creek Cave can also be found here.

== Upper Barton Creek ==
Upper Barton Creek is a unique settlement of reformers from different Anabaptist backgrounds, who wanted to create a Mennonite community free of modernistic trends and in nonconformity to the world to live a simple Christian life. It was established in 1969 by Plautdietsch speaking "Russian" Mennonites. Following their Ordnung the Mennonites of Upper Barton Creek do not own any equipment with motors, including cars, nor do they use electricity. They farm with horses and both men and women wear plain dress similar to Old Order Mennonites and Amish with men wearing beards. The Mennonites of Upper Barton Creek are counted to the Noah Hoover group, which originally is from central Pennsylvania. In 2010 it had a population of 380.

== Lower Barton Creek ==
Lower Barton Creek is a small village, that was founded in 1966 by Mennonites from Shipyard in Belize. It is home of the most conservative German speaking "Russian" Mennonites in Belize. It is similar to conservative Mennonite settlements in Bolivia. It had a population of about 150 in 1980, about 200 in 1985 and only about 100 in 1989, after many inhabitants left for Mennonite colonies in Paraguay, Bolivia and elsewhere. Its population stood at 193 in 2010.

== Barton Creek Cave ==
Barton Creek Cave is a natural cave, known as both an archaeological site and as a tourist destination.

== Literature ==
- Carel Roessingh and Tanja Plasil (Editors): Between Horse & Buggy and Four-Wheel Drive: Change and Diversity Among Mennonite Settlements in Belize, Central America, Amsterdam 2009.
- Dale J. Nippert: Agricultural Colonization: The Mennonites of Upper Barton Creek, Belize, Memphis 1994.
- Helmut Schneider: Tradition und Veränderung in Belize (Mittelamerika): ein soziologischer Vergleich der Gemeinden San Ignacio und Upper Barton Creek, Berlin 1990.
- Karen Kingsbury: A Distant Shore, New York 2021, (a suspense novel by NY Times Bestseller author Karen Kingsbury),
