= Shipyard, Belize =

Shipyard
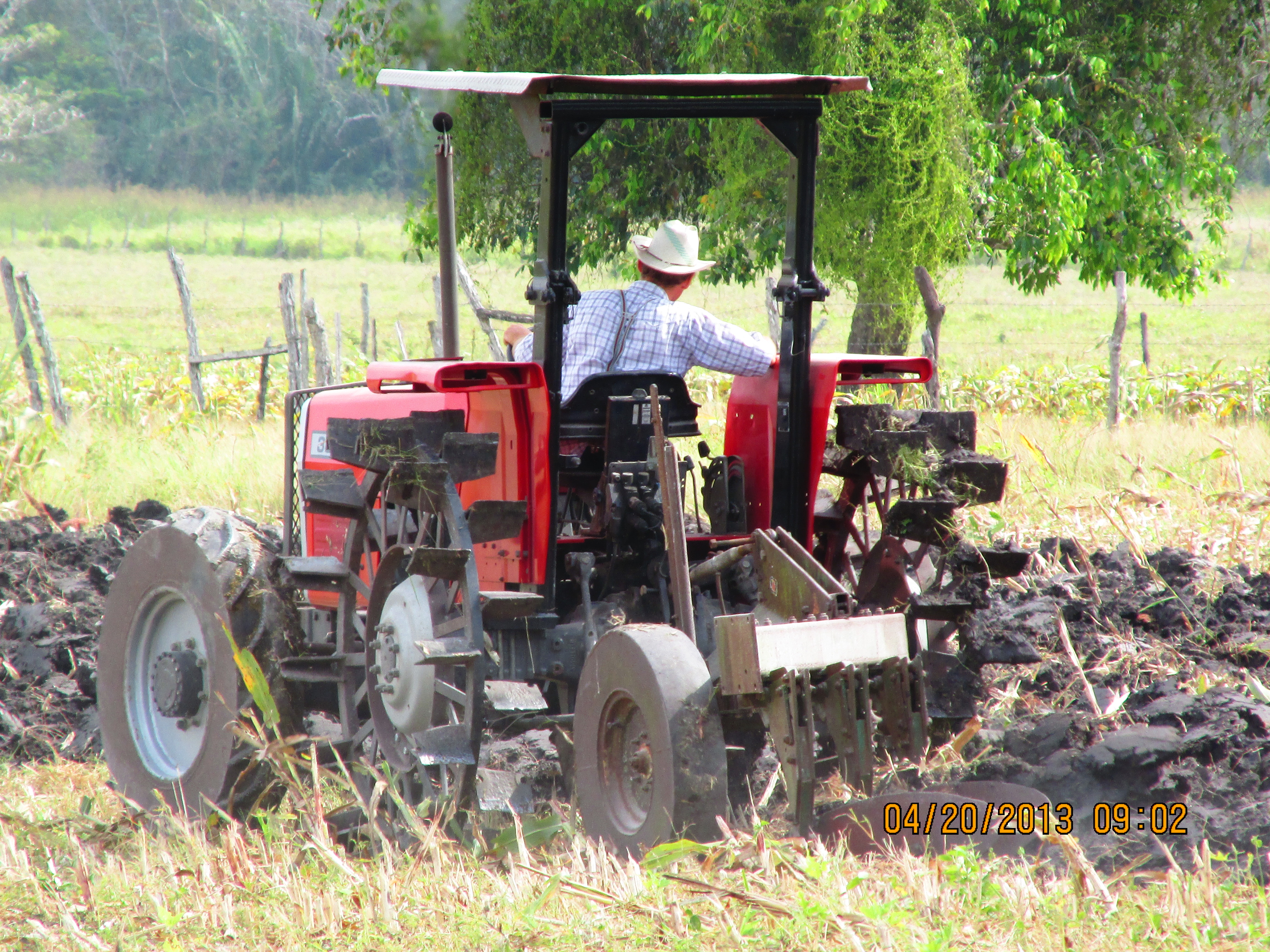
- Mennonite ploughing fields with steel wheels in Shipyard

- Location within Belize
- Coordinates: 17°55′N 88°40′W
- Country: Belize
- District: Orange Walk District
- Established: 1958

Area
  - Total: 134.1 km^{2} (51.8 sq mi)

Population (2022)
  - Total: 4,070
  - Density: 30.4/km^{2} (79/sq mi)
- Time zone: UTC-6 (Central)
- Climate: Am

Shipyard, also called Shipyard Colony, is a Mennonite settlement that is also an administrative village in the Orange Walk District of Belize.

Shipyard was founded in 1958 by Old Colony Mennonites from Chihuahua and Durango states in Mexico. It consists of more than 20 camps (German: "dörfer"), which have German names like "Blumenort" or "Hochfeld", but outside the Mennonite community they are referred to only by numbers, e. g. "Camp 5" instead of "Reinfeld".

Most of the population of Shipyard are Plautdietsch-speaking ethnic Mennonites, living in a very integrated community where most of them work as carpenters, farmers and mechanics. Most Mennonites of Shipyard are quite traditional in lifestyle, still using horse and buggy for transportation and tractors with steel wheels for fieldwork. Compared with other Mennonites in Belize, Shipyard is more conservative than Spanish Lookout and Blue Creek, but more modern concerning the use of technology than Upper Barton Creek, Springfield and daughter colonies.

== Population ==
Historical population
Year	Pop.	±%
1960	728	—
1987	1,946	+167.3%
2000	2,334	+19.9%
2010	3,345	+43.3%
2014	3,497	+4.5%
2017	3,805	+8.8%
2022	4,070	+7.0%

Around 1960 the total population of Shipyard was 728. In 1987 it had grown to 1,966. In the 2014 census it had a total population of 3,497 people. In 2017 it has grown to 3,805 people. It is thus the largest Mennonite settlement in Belize. The population has reached 4,070 as of 2022 census.

== See also ==
- Mennonites in Belize
