= Kleine Gemeinde =

Mennonite denomination

Kleine Gemeinde is a Mennonite denomination founded in 1812 by Klaas Reimer in the Russian Empire. The current group primarily consists of Plautdietsch-speaking Russian Mennonites in Belize, Mexico and Bolivia, as well as a small presence in Canada and the United States. In 2015 it had some 5,400 baptized members. Most of its Canadian congregations diverged from the others over the latter half of the 20th century and are now called the Evangelical Mennonite Conference.

== History ==
The Kleine Gemeinde was founded in 1812 by a small group of Mennonites dissatisfied with the state of the existing church in the Molotschna colony settlement of then south Russia (present-day Ukraine). Their first elder was Klaas Reimer. The name Kleine Gemeinde means Small Church, or congregation. The group changed their name from Kleine Gemeinde to Evangelical Mennonite Church in 1952, and to Evangelical Mennonite Conference in 1959.

=== Klaas Reimer ===
Klaas Reimer (1770–1837), a Mennonite minister from Danzig, a German-speaking city at that time, settled in Molotschna, a Mennonite settlement in southern Russia in 1805. Reimer felt Mennonites of the area were too lax in doctrine and piety, and began to hold meetings in homes in 1812. He was joined by another minister, Cornelius Janzen, and eighteen members, who together recognized themselves as a separate church body in 1814.

As for reasons for the 1812 separation, an 1838 pamphlet addresses five disputes with the main Mennonite body. The primary complaint was that Mennonite leaders were straying from their traditional nonresistant stance when they turned lawbreakers over to the government for punishment, while at the same time church leaders became more lax in enforcing spiritual discipline. An increased use of alcohol and other vices were cited as evidence.

The second problem was inconsistent application of discipline for minor offenses; while the breakaway group was banned, other types of offenses were ignored. Third, to a disloyalty charge, they reaffirmed their submission to the government while maintaining a stance against any involvement with detaining or punishing offenders. Fourth, they did not approve of attending weddings, which had become worldly in their view. Its final criticism was aimed at sermons and eulogies at funerals, practices that had recently been adopted from Catholics and Lutherans.

=== In Russia ===
Starting in 1860 Kleine Gemeinde members left the Molotschna Mennonite Settlement to provide farming opportunities for landless members and to avoid political and administrative involvement in the mother colony. In 1863 a settlement was started at Markusland in Yekaterinoslav Governorate, in 1864 another settlement in Gurshafka volost, Kherson Governorate. In 1865, the Borsenko colony, 20 miles northwest of Nikopol, was started. Two other villages situated near Borozenko were also settled by Kleine Gemeinde families.

In 1860 a group motivated by a renewal movement migrated to Crimea under the leadership of Jakob Wiebe. This group adopted baptism by immersion. After migrating in 1874 to Kansas, they became known as the Krimmer Mennonite Brethren.

=== Migration to North America ===
In 1870 the Russian government issued a proclamation stating the intention to end all special privileges granted to German colonists by 1880. Alarmed at the possibility of losing control of their schools and military exemption, a delegation of Mennonite and Hutterite leaders, including Cornelius Toews, Aeltester Friesen and David Klassen of the Kleine Gemeinde, visited North America in 1873 to investigate resettlement possibilities. In 1874–75, the main group proceeded to migrate to North America, the more conservative part settling in Manitoba, Canada, and the more liberal to Jefferson County, near the town of Jansen, Nebraska, US.

Altogether some 200 Kleine Gemeide families emigrated to North America as part of a larger Mennonite migration. About eighty families homesteaded in southern Manitoba, while a smaller group of approximately 36 families settled in Nebraska.

=== North America ===
The Jansen group moved to Kansas and eventually seceded from the Kleine Gemeinde. Later, a number of the Kleine Gemeinde joined John Holdeman's Church of God in Christ, Mennonite. In 1952, the Kleine Gemeinde in Canada changed its name to the Evangelical Mennonite Church, and then (because of a U.S. group of prior, same name) to the Evangelical Mennonite Conference in 1959. The Kleine Gemeinde in Mexico did not follow the name changes.

=== Migration to Mexico, Belize and Bolivia ===
In 1948 conservative members of the Kleine Gemeinde migrated from Canada to Los Jagueyes (also known as Quellen Kolonie) some 100 km north of Cuauhtémoc, Chihuahua in Mexico. Ten years later Kleine Gemeinde congregations were also formed in Belize, where most of them modernized moderately and where they still kept their original name. There they did not follow the radical changes which the Evangelical Mennonite Conference experienced.

In 1983 the Kleine Gemeinde of Belize founded a new settlement in Nova Scotia. In 2001, there were 795 Mennonites living in Nova Scotia; however, this was across four different groups, including the Kleine Gemeinde.

Today Kleine Gemeinde is also present in Bolivia.

== Congregations and baptized members ==
In 1998 the Kleine Gemeinde had 1,335 members in 12 congregations in Mexico, 658 members in 4 congregations in Spanish Lookout in Belize and 216 members in 2 congregations in Blue Creek in Belize.

In 2009 there were 710 baptized members in 4 congregations in Spanish Lookout and 60 baptized members in one congregation in Blue Creek.

In 2015 the Kleine Gemeinde had 3,000 baptized members in 21 congregations in Mexico, 682 baptized members in 2015 in Bolivia, 660 baptized members in 12 congregations in Canada and in Belize 756 members in 5 congregations in Spanish Lookout while there were 70 members in one congregation in Blue Creek. In the US there were 314 baptized members in 4 congregations.

Name and Country	Membership in 2015	Congregations in 2015
Kleingemeinde in Mexiko	3,000	21
Kleine Gemeinde zu Spanish Lookout, Belize	756	5
Kleine Gemeinde zu Blue Creek, Belize	70	1
Kleingemeinde, Bolivia	682	?
Kleine Gemeinde Mennonite Church, Canada	660	12
Kleine Gemeinde, USA	314	4
Total	5,482	43

=== Notable congregants and descendants ===
- David Bergen, Canadian novelist
- Patrick Friesen, Canadian poet
- Matt Groening, American animator
- A. D. Penner, Canadian politician
- Casey Plett, Canadian novelist
- Klaas Reimer, founder of the Kleine Gemeinde
- Miriam Toews, Canadian novelist
- Andrew Unger, Canadian novelist and satirist

== Literature ==
- Delbert F. Plett: The Golden Years: The Mennonite Kleine Gemeinde in Russia (1812–1849), 1985.
- Delbert F. Plett (compiler): Pioneers and pilgrims, the Mennonite Kleine Gemeinde in Manitoba, Nebraska, and Kansas, 1874 to 1882, 1990.
- Delbert F. Plett (editor): Leaders of the Mennonite Kleine Gemeinde In Russia, 1812 to 1874, Steinbach, Manitoba, 1993.
- Delbert F. Plett: Saints and Sinners - The Kleine Gemeinde in Imperial Russia 1812 to 1875, Steinbach, Manitoba, 1999.
