= Evangelical Mennonite Mission Conference =

International evangelical Christian meeting

The Evangelical Mennonite Mission Conference (EMMC) is an evangelical body of Mennonite Christians, organized on July 1, 1959.

The EMMC was formed from the Rudnerweider Mennonite Church, which was organized in 1937. The Rudnerweider Mennonite Church arose in a revival that placed great emphasis on personal conversion, evangelism and missions, and split the Sommerfelder Mennonite Church in Manitoba. The conference is currently (2017) made up of 23 congregations in Canada (Alberta, Manitoba, Ontario and Saskatchewan), three in Belize, and two in Mexico. Offices are in Winnipeg, Manitoba. A convention is held annually. The EMMC is a member of the Mennonite World Conference.
