= Mennonites in Belize =

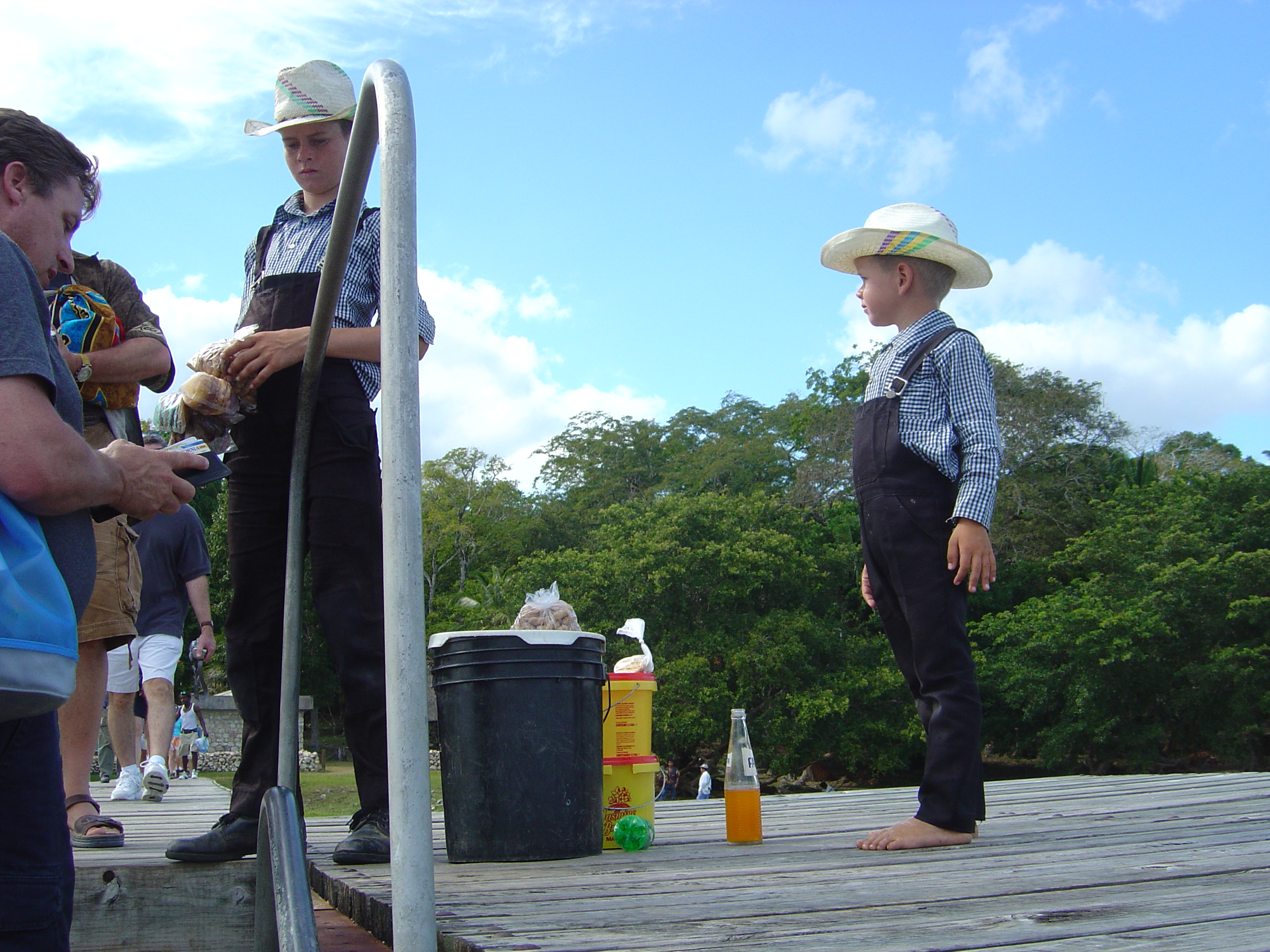
- Mennonite children selling peanuts to tourists near Lamanai in Belize.

Total population
- 15,249 ethnic Mennonites; 15,440 (by religion) (2022)

Regions with significant populations
- Orange Walk District, Cayo District, Corozal District

Religions
- Mennonitism, a part of Anabaptism

Scriptures
- The Bible, the Complete Writings of Menno Simons

Languages
- Plautdietsch, English, Pennsylvania German

Mennonites in Belize form different religious bodies and come from different ethnic backgrounds. There are groups of Mennonites living in Belize who are more traditional and conservative (e. g. in Shipyard and Upper Barton Creek), while others have modernized to various degrees (e. g. in Spanish Lookout and Blue Creek).

There were 4,961 members as of 2014, but the total number including children and young unbaptized adults was around 12,000. Of these some 10,000 were ethnic Mennonites, most of them Russian Mennonites, who speak Plautdietsch, a Low German dialect. There are also some hundreds of Pennsylvania German speaking Old Order Mennonites in Belize. In addition to this, there were another 2,000 mostly Kriol and Mestizo Belizeans who had converted to Mennonitism.

The so-called Holdeman Mennonites and the Beachy Amish are groups originally of German descent that also welcome people of other ethnic background to join their congregations.

== History ==
The Friesian and Flemish ancestors of the vast majority of Belizean Mennonites settled in the Vistula delta, starting in the middle of the 16th century and migrated to southern Russia between 1789 and the early 1800s, settling the Chortitza and Molotschna Mennonite colonies. During the years in Russia they became an ethnoreligious group.

In the years after 1873, some 11,000 of them left the Russian Empire and settled in Manitoba, Canada and an equal number went to the US. The more conservative ones left Canada between 1922 and 1925 and settled in Mexico. In the years after 1958, some 1,700 Mennonites from the Mexican settlements moved to what was then British Honduras.

The Russian Mennonites speak Plautdietsch in everyday life among themselves. There are also some hundred Pennsylvania German-speaking Old Order Mennonites who came from the USA and Canada in the late 1960s and settle now in Upper Barton Creek and daughter settlements.

Mennonites from El Salvador moved to Belize during their civil war.

== Customs and traditions ==
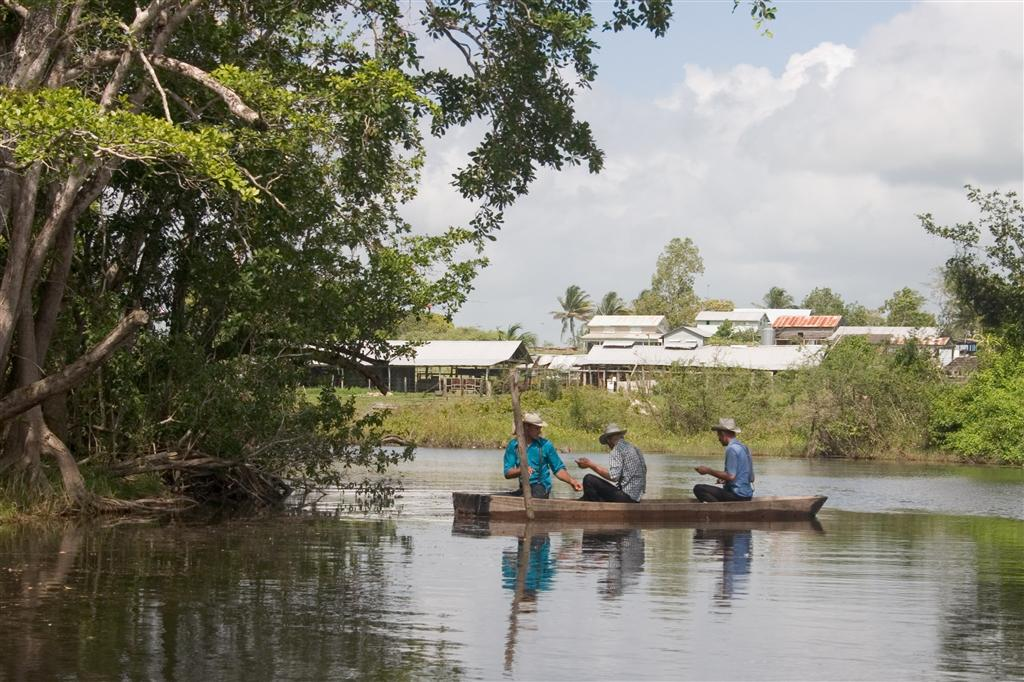
Mennonites on New River, Belize

Mennonites are easily identified by their clothing, except from the ones who have modernized to a large degree or have never been traditional, because they have converted in recent times. The women wear bonnets and long dresses while the men wear denim overalls and hats. The men may wear traditional suspenders and dark trousers. The women wear brightly colored dresses. In many of the Mennonite communities there is a softening of the old tradition. In Upper Barton Creek and daughter settlements, men and women dress similar to the Old Order Amish. Both Old Colony Mennonites and Noah Hoover Mennonites use horse-drawn buggies for transportation, but only the Noah Hoovers also till fields with horse-drawn implements.

Traditional Mennonites conduct burial services mainly in German, but with some parts in English so that visitors can take part. After the service the whole congregation files orderly to the front of the church to pay their last respect. In Spanish Lookout, members and friends of the deceased address the congregation after the obituary has been read. Tombs are not used, but a cross marks the name and spot. Before burying the body to the earth, hymns are sung. Members of the community take turns shoveling the earth until the burial is complete. After that the community comes together and eat bread, sausages and coffee with the bereaved family.

Marriages usually start with courtship, which can last for six months to a year. The boy's parents ask the girl's father for permission. After that the parents get together and set the wedding date. The penultimate Saturday evening before the wedding is called "Falafnes" (Standard German: Verlöbnis). On this event, the friend of the bride and the groom share the Bible reading. Weddings are performed on Sundays. They usually consist of two ministers: one to explain the meaning of matrimony, and the other to do the blessings. Gifts given are usually tools and household items.

Mennonites from the Noah Hoover group in Upper Barton Creek and daughter settlements are extremely restrictive concerning the use of motors and electricity, that is, both motors and electricity are forbidden in the settlement by the members of the group. Their clothing is very similar to the Old Order Amish, and men wear beards like the Amish. Therefore, they are often perceived as Amish and called Amish, even though this is not the case.

The Mennonites have made it a point to have their own school, church, and financial institution in their community.

== Languages ==
The vast majority – more than 95% – of ethnic Mennonites in Belize speak Plautdietsch in everyday life. A small minority of very conservative Mennonites that came from North America mostly in the second half of the 1960s speak Pennsylvania German instead. Both groups use Standard German for reading the Bible, in school and in Church. English and Belizean Spanish are used mainly by men for communication outside their communities, Belizean Spanish is also spoken by descendants of Mexican Mennonites and Salvadoran Mennonites. Almost all Mennonites from churches who do outreach in Belize, e. g. Beachy Amish Mennonites, speak mainly English. Mennonites from other ethnic backgrounds use their ethno-languages.

== Colonies and villages ==
Historical populations of ethnic Mennonites
Year	Pop.	±%
1958	50	—
1987	4,739	+9378.0%
1991	5,763	+21.6%
2000	8,276	+43.6%
2010	11,258	+36.0%
2022	15,249	+35.5%
Estimates:

Map of the Mennonite colonies in Belize

The total population of Mennonites, including unbaptized children, stood at 4,959 in 1987. The major colonies with their population in 1987 were Shipyard (1,946), Spanish Lookout (1,125) and Little Belize (1,004). Richmond Hill existed only from 1960 to 1965. Presently in Belize there are different communities of Mennonites, namely the colonies Shipyard, Blue Creek, Little Belize, Spanish Lookout, Indian Creek and the villages Upper and Lower Barton Creek, Springfield and Pine Hill. A 2020 survey found that there are more than 200 Mennonite colonies in nine Latin American countries, with 15 in Belize.

Colony	District	Established	Origin of first colonists	Affiliation	Orientation	Population (1987)	Population (2000)	Population (2010)	Population (2022)	Average household size[2022]
Shipyard	Orange Walk	1958	Ojo de la Yegua, MX	Old Colony	Traditional	1,946	2,334	3,345	4,070	5.1
Spanish Lookout	Cayo	1958	Los Jagueyes, MX	Kleine Gemeinde	Very modern	1,125	1,899	2,253	3,108	4.0
Blue Creek	Orange Walk	1958	Los Jagueyes, MX	EMMC, Kleine Gemeinde*	Very modern	~400	767	407	841	3.4
Pilgrimage Valley	Cayo	1967-c.1972 (defunct)	Arkansas, USA	"Pure Church" (former Stauffer Mennonites, Titus Hoover Mennonites, and Old Order Mennonites)	Very conservative	---	---	---	---	---
Lower Barton Creek	Cayo	1966	Spanish Lookout	"Pure Church" (former Kleine Gemeinde and Sommerfelder)	Very conservative	~100	?	193	518	6.0
Upper Barton Creek	Cayo	1969	Pilgrimage Valley, Lower Barton Creek	Noah Hoover (1984-2017)	Very conservative (till 2017); moderate modern (since 2017)	~157	?	380	110	4.2
Little Belize	Corozal	1978	Shipyard	Old Colony	Traditional	1,004	2,207	2,650	2,888	5.6
Indian Creek	Orange Walk	1988	Shipyard	Old Colony	Traditional	---	747	904	1,080	5.0
Springfield	Cayo	1996	Upper Barton Creek	Noah Hoover	Very conservative	---	?	270	240	6.4
Pine Hill	Toledo	1997	Lower Barton Creek	"Pure Church"	Very conservative	---	97	206	334	5.7
Neuland	Corozal	2010	Shipyard	Old Colony	Traditional	---	---	?	1,080	5.6
Viva Esperanza	Corozal	2011	Spanish Lookout, Little Belize	Kleine Gemeinde	Very modern	---	---	---	~45	~4
Bird Walk	Belize	2011	Springfield	Noah Hoover	Very conservative	---	---	---	147	5.5
Green Hill Manatee	Belize	2021	Pine Hill	"Pure Church"	Very conservative	---	---	---	177	5.7
Roseville	Toledo	2012	Springfield	Noah Hoover	Very conservative	---	---	---	159	6.2
Newland (Nieelaund)	Toledo	2012	Lower Barton Creek	"Pure Church"	Very conservative	---	---	---	210	6.6
Centerville	Cayo	2012	Springfield	independent (former Noah Hoover)	Moderate conservative	---	---	---	~60	~6
Mountain Valley	Stann Creek	2020	Roseville	Noah Hoover	Very conservative	---	---	---	101	7.7
New Holland	Cayo	?	Lower Barton Creek	"Pure Church"	Very Conservative	---	---	---	162	5.2
Total in Belize							~4,739	10,865 (11,658)	15,249 (15,440)	

* Blue Creek was founded by Old Colony Mennonites but in 1966 many joined EMMC and the remaining Old Colony members moved away. In 1978 members of the Kleine Gemeinde moved there.

In 1999, the Mennonites – when not counting converts from other groups – had a birth rate of 42.53 per 1000, which was well above the national average of 30.71 per 1000. Because it is not possible to establish new large colonies in Belize, Plautdietsch speaking Mennonites from Belize emigrated to several other Latin American countries but mainly to Bolivia.

There are four newer villages: Bird Walk (founded 2011) and Roseville (founded 2012), which are daughter villages from Upper Barton Creek and Springfield and Green Hills which is affiliated with the Mennonites of Pine Hill and Neuland (New Land).

Smaller outreaches of Conservative Mennonites can be found in numerous communities throughout Belize.

=== Population by district ===
District
District	2010		2022	
%	Number	%	Number	%
Orange Walk	5,036	10.96%	5,831	10.77%
Corozal	2,732	6.65%	4,009	8.84%
Cayo	3,058	4.07%	4,126	4.16%
Toledo	248	0.81%	729	1.96%
Stann Creek	46	0.13%	168	0.35%
Belize	138	0.14%	385	0.34%
Total	11,258	100%	15,249	100%

== Mennonite Groups and membership ==
As Mennonites accept only adults as members, the total population of the Mennonite congregations in Belize is underestimated by membership counts. The largest denomination was Altkolonier Mennoniten Gemeinde, with 2,052 members. Other denominations were Kleine Gemeinde zu Spanish Lookout (with 710 members) and Kleine Gemeinde zu Blue Creek (with 60 members), Iglesia Evangélica Menonita de Belice (with 400 members, mostly Mestizos), Evangelical Mennonite Mission Conference (with 388 members), Beachy Amish Mennonite Fellowship (with 140 members), Caribbean Light and Truth (with 137 members, mostly Kriol) and Church of God in Christ, Mennonite (with 42 members, mostly Kriol) (All figures as of 2006).

Mennonite group	Member- ship in 2009	Congre- gations in 2009	Member- ship in 2012	Congre- gations in 2012
Altkolonier Mennonitengemeinde	2,052	3	2,532	3
Beachy Amish Church	164	6	176	6
Church of God in Christ, Mennonite	51	2	61	2
Evangelical Mennonite Mission Conference	482	3	535	5
Iglesia Evangélica Menonita de Belice	420	10	544	8
Kleine Gemeinde			770	5
Kleine Gemeinde zu Blue Creek	60	1		
Kleine Gemeinde zu Spanish Lookout	710	4		
Independent & unaffiliated	190	18	199	15
Total	4,129	47	4,817	44

== Economic contributions to Belize ==
Mennonites in Belize contribute to the carpentry, engineering and agricultural industries of Belize. They produce milk, cheese, beans, corn, melons, honey, chicken, and eggs. They have turned sections of tropical jungle into highly productive farmland. They are also skilled in manufacturing household furniture as well as constructing houses.

== Controversy ==
While the Mennonites in Belize have been very prosperous in agriculture, geography professor Michael Trapasso wrote, in a 1992 article published in the academic journal GeoJournal, that there have been complaints that they often do so with no regard for the environment or environmental laws. Trapasso wrote that the environmental impact of their farming methods leads to large-scale deforestation.

On the other hand, a paper of the FAO states the following about Mennonites in Belize. (Even though the report speaks of "Amish", it refers to Old Order Mennonites of the Noah Hoover group who live in settlements like Upper Barton Creek, Springfield and Pine Hill):

Amish agriculture is characterized by the use of animal power and natural forms of energy, and is almost completely independent from fossil fuels as a form of energy. Success is measured in a number of ways foremost amongst these are the capacity to feed themselves, contribute to national food security, create sustainable livelihoods based on farming for all community members, be independent from government financial support, social, and educational services, though they use health services. Last but not least, their capacity to purchase their own production resources. Amish agriculture is well planned, sustainable, and expanding.

== See also ==
- Belize Evangelical Mennonite Church
- Demographics of Belize
