= Springfield, Belize =

Springfield
- Location within Belize
- Coordinates: 17°8′37″N 88°48′24″W
- Country: Belize
- District: Cayo District

Population (2010)
  - Total: 270
- Time zone: UTC-6 (Central)

Springfield is a Mennonite village in Cayo District, Belize, some 15 km south of the capital Belmopan.

== History ==
Springfield was founded around 1996 as a daughter colony of the Upper Barton Creek settlement of very conservative Mennonites, who mainly live in the United States. These Mennonites, that belong to the Noah Hoover branch of Old Order Mennonites, are in many outward aspects similar to Old Order Amish, but clearly distinct from them. Norris Hall, a photojournalist who in 2011 made a photo documentary about the people of Springfield, erroneously refers to them as "Amish".

== Sights ==
In Springfield there is a fruit tree nursery and a horse powered saw mill.

== Demographics ==
The village population of 270 residents is composed of 40 families of Plautdietsch and Pennsylvania German speaking Mennonites. They have large families, in average 6.8 persons per household.
