= Sommerfelder =

Mennonite subgroup

The Sommerfelders, also called Sommerfeld Mennonites or Sommerfeld Mennonite Church (German: Sommerfelder Mennoniten-Gemeinde), are a Christian group.

They are a subgroup of the so-called Russian Mennonites who lived in the Bergthal Colony in Zaporizhzhia (then part of the Russian Empire) in the late 1800s. The colony members moved to Canada in the 1870s, but split in 1893. The larger group became known as the Sommerfeld Mennoniten Gemeinde, while the smaller group named themselves the Bergthaler Mennonite Church of Manitoba. The Sommerfeld group is the more conservative of the two. The group was based in Sommerfeld in Rhineland, Manitoba.

Over time, the Canadian government required all children to take part in government education programmes. Some of the Sommerfeld members disagreed with this and decided to move to South America where they would be allowed to educate their own children as they saw fit. Some emigrated to Mexico in 1922, with others travelling to Paraguay in 1927 and 1948.

Many of them left Canada for Latin America starting in the early 1920s. They now live in Canada, Mexico, Paraguay and Bolivia.

In 1985 they had a total population of about 5,400 people in Manitoba and Saskatchewan in Canada and in 1987 they had 10 colonies in Latin America with a total population of about 7,500 people.

In 2007 they had churches in Manitoba, Saskatchewan, Ontario, Alberta and British Columbia.

In 1936, there was a revival movement among the group. This movement emphasized personal conversion, evangelism and missions, and led to the creation of a new group known as the Rudnerweider Mennonite Church. In 1959, the RMC later became known as the Evangelical Mennonite Mission Conference.

== See also ==
- Sommerfeld Colony, Paraguay
