= Spanish Lookout =

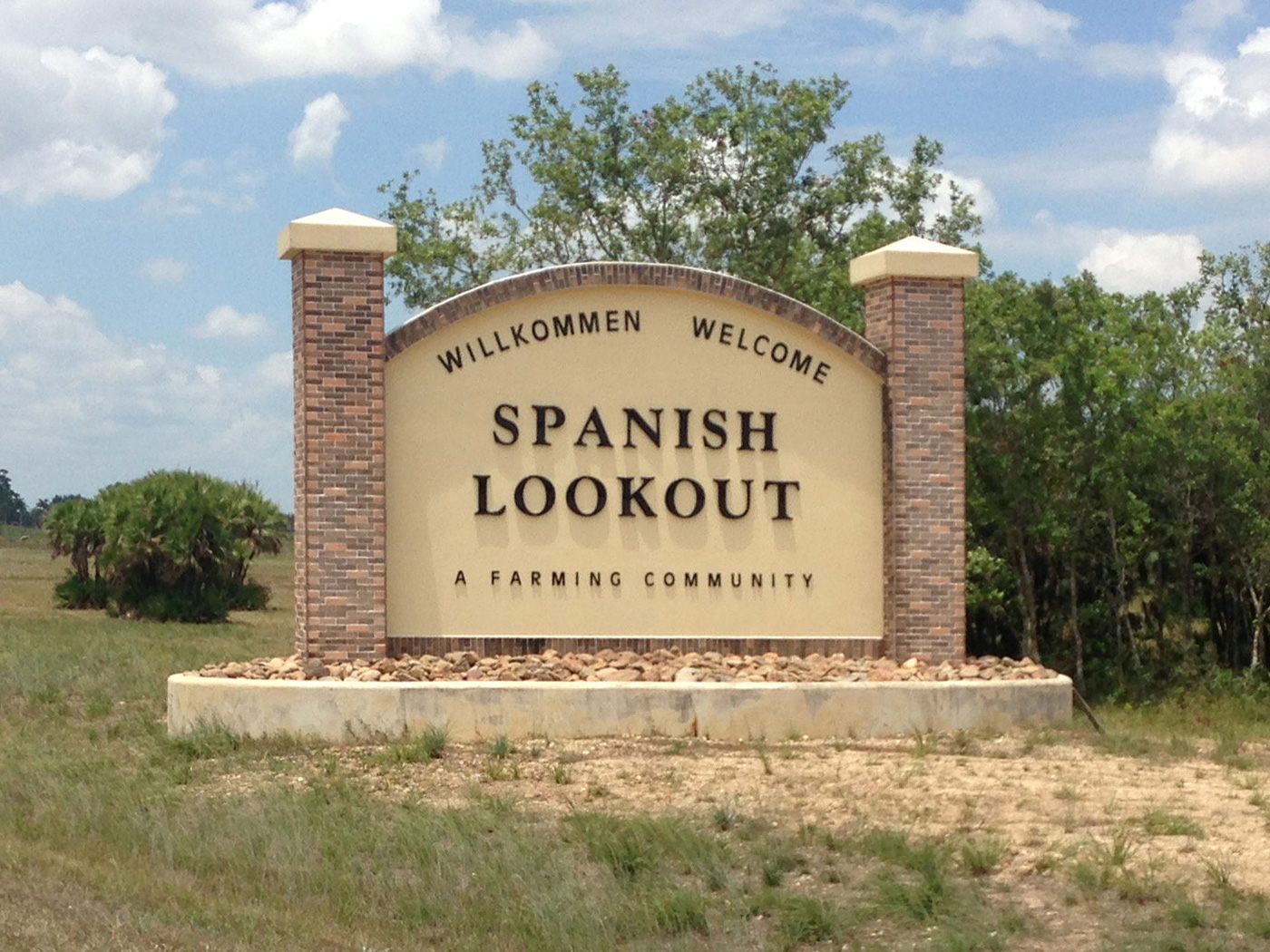

- Location within Belize
- Coordinates: 17.2504°N 88.9974°W
- Country: Belize
- District: Cayo District
- Constituency: Cayo North East
- Established: 1958

Area
  - Total: 421.4 km^{2} (162.7 sq mi)

Population (2022)
  - Total: 3,108
  - Density: 7.4/km^{2} (19/sq mi)
- Time zone: UTC-6 (Central)

Spanish Lookout is a Mennonite settlement in the Cayo District of Belize in Central America. According to the 2010 census, Spanish Lookout had a population of 2,253 people in 482 households (2005 census had a population of 2,300 and the 2000 census had a population of 1,786). As of the 2022 census, population have increased to 3,108.

The Mennonite community in Spanish Lookout is quite modern: they use cars and other modern conveniences and the overall impression of the settlement is rather like rural North America than Central America or the Caribbean. The citizens of this community speak Plautdietsch as their mother tongue. Most also speak English and Spanish. It is largely an agricultural community with some light industry, furniture making, prefabricated wood houses and the only oil field in production in Belize.

== History ==
In 1958 Kleine Gemeinde Mennonites from Mexico moved to Belize, creating the Spanish Lookout settlement. They objected to a new social welfare law in Mexico and arable land was more readily available in Belize. Over time, a number of families left for Manitoba and Nova Scotia, Canada. In 1966 over 30 conservative families left the settlement for Paraguay due to conflicting beliefs about modernization. Another group also left the colony and started a new colony in Lower Barton Creek. Nevertheless, the settlement's population of 1,108 in 1987 has more than doubled until 2010 through natural growth. In the 1980s, refugees arrived from Guatemala and El Salvador finding employment and schooling for their children within the settlement.

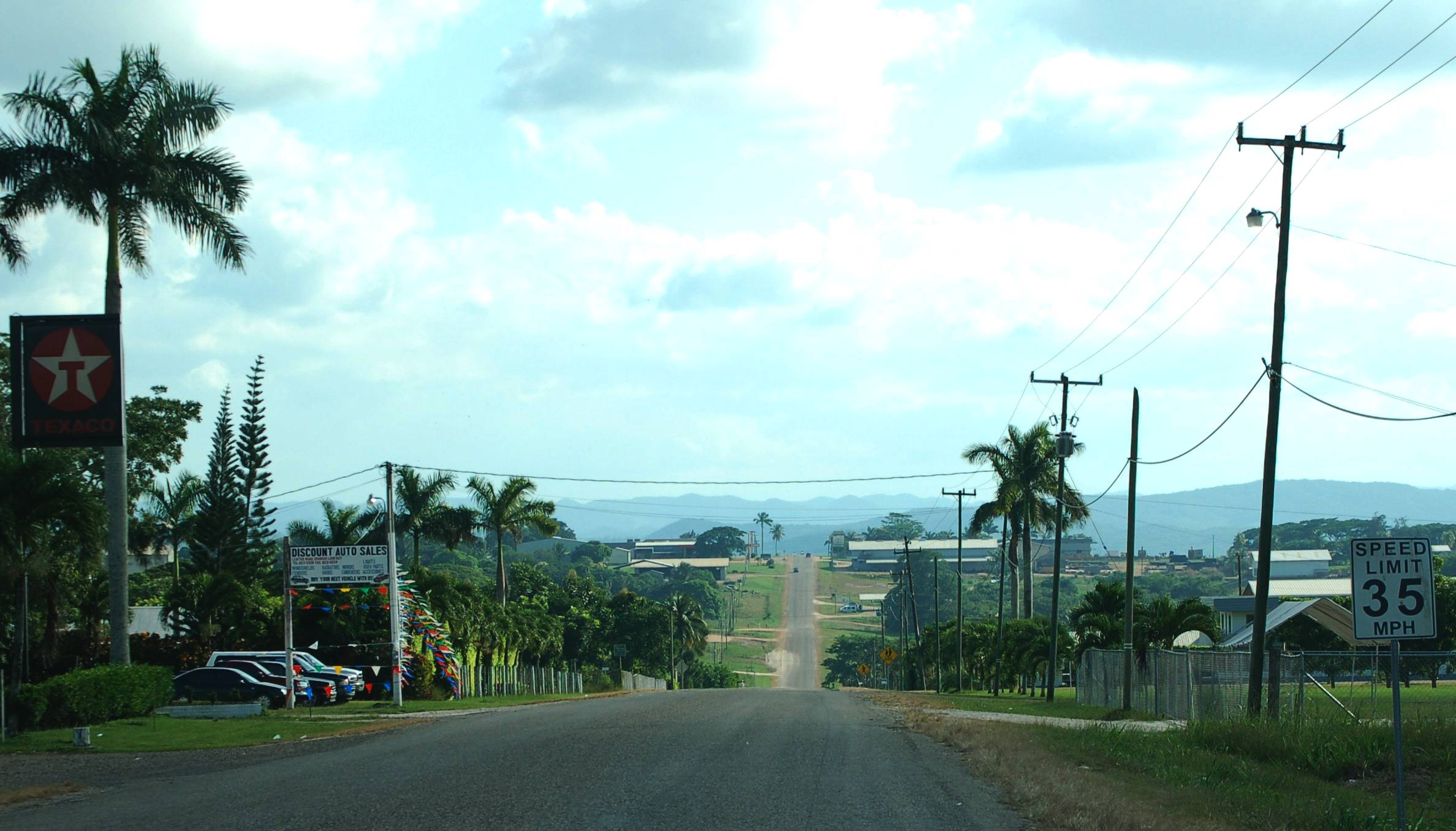
The main road at Spanish Lookout on a Sunday morning in 2007

== Location and geographic setting ==
Spanish Lookout is accessible via several roads, going north off the George Price Highway. The main access to Spanish Lookout is via the Iguana Creek Bridge. The Central Farm entrance takes you across the Belize River, via one of Belize’s two hand-cranked ferries equipped to transport vehicles. Several vehicles can fit on the ferry at once, while larger trucks may pass one or two at a time.

== Demographics ==
Historical population
Year	Pop.	±%
1987	1,125	—
2000	1,899	+68.8%
2010	2,253	+18.6%
2022	3,108	+37.9%

At the time of the 2010 census, Spanish Lookout had a population of 2,253. Of these, 86.8% were Mennonite, 8.7% Mestizo, 2.0% Mixed, 1.4% Caucasian, 0.8% Ketchi Maya and 0.1% Creole.

In terms of languages spoken (multiple answers allowed), 87.9% spoke English, 87.2% German, 27.3% Spanish, 2.4% Creole, 0.6% Ketchi Maya, 0.4% Garifuna, 0.1% Mandarin or Cantonese, 0.1% Mopan Maya, 0.1% Yucatec Maya and 5.1% other languages; 0.2% could not speak.

== Climate ==
Spanish Lookout has a tropical climate, with little temperature difference between seasons, but a pronounced rainy season. The warmest month on average is May. The coolest month on average is January.

Climate data for Spanish Lookout, Belize (1973–2014)
Month	Jan	Feb	Mar	Apr	May	Jun	Jul	Aug	Sep	Oct	Nov	Dec	Year
Daily mean °C	22	23	24	25	27	27	26	26	26	25	23	23	24
Average rainfall mm	113	57	45	40	71	208	225	131	183	182	178	142	1,574
Daily mean °F	71	73	75	77	80	80	78	78	78	77	73	73	75
Average rainfall inches	4.4	2.2	1.8	1.6	2.8	8.2	8.9	5.2	7.2	7.2	7.0	5.6	62.0
Source: Weatherbase

== Economy ==
Spanish Lookout is a major exporter of beans, corn, chicken and dairy products. As of 2006, Spanish Lookout has the only commercial oilfield within Belize.

=== Major businesses in Spanish Lookout ===
- Quality Poultry Products - The largest chicken producer in the country with branches in Punta Gorda, Independence, Dangriga, Belmopan, San Ignacio, Belize City, Orange Walk, Corozal and San Pedro. They also have a restaurant chain called Chicken Express with branches in Punta Gorda, Dangriga, Belmopan, San Ignacio, Belize City and Corozal.
- Western Dairies - The only commercial producer of milk in the country, they also produce ice cream, cheese, yogurt and other dairy related products. They have branches in Belize City, Orange Walk and San Pedro. They also have a tiny ice cream business in San Ignacio. In Spanish Lookout they have a large restaurant that gets very busy on weekends with customers from all over the country.
- Koop Sheet Metal - The largest roofing supplier in Belize they produce their own roof sheeting. They've been a major roof supplier since Hurricane Hattie.
- Country Foods - The largest egg supplier in Belize, they also supply a large percentage of beans, rice, corn and corn flour in the country. They have a transfer depot in Bella Vista and a branch in San Pedro.
- Caribbean Tire/Caribbean Motors - With branches in Dangriga, Cattle Landing, Belize City, Orange Walk, San Ignacio and even in Chetumal, Mexico, they are the largest vehicle and tire vendor in Belize.
- Belcar Export - Belcar cleans beans and corn, bags of packages them and then exports them out of the country to destinations in the Caribbean.
- Reimer's Feed Mill - One of two large feed mills in Spanish Lookout, they have branches in Cattle Landing, San Ignacio, Belize City and Orange Walk.
- Country Meats - They specialize in beef and pork products.
- Farmers Light Plant Corporation - The largest power provider not connected to the national grid. FLPC used to be part of Western Dairies. They are always innovating and seeking for various sources of power generation. About 30% of power comes from solar and the rest from crude oil and other methods.

== Gallery ==
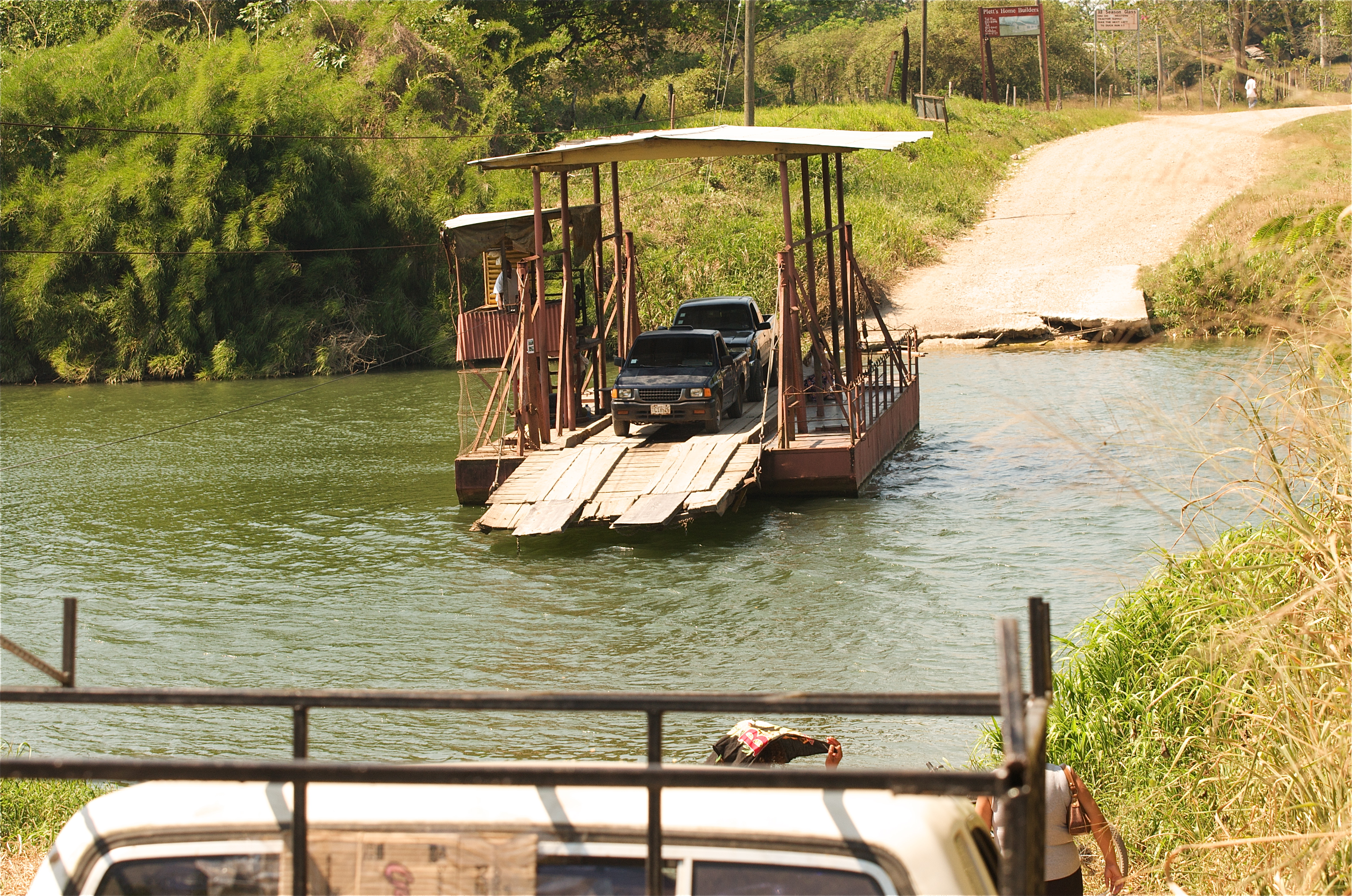
Hand-operated Ferry

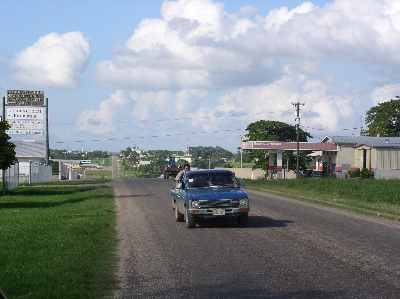
principal avenue

== Literature ==
- Heinrich Penner, John D. Reimer, Leonard M. Reimer: Spanish Lookout since 1958 - Progress in Action, Spanish Lookout 2008.
