= Old Colony Mennonites =

Parts of the Russian Mennonite movement

Old Colony Mennonites (German: Altkolonier-Mennoniten) are a part of the Russian Mennonite movement that descends from colonists who migrated from the Chortitza Colony northwest of Khortytsia Island, in modern Ukraine near Zaporizhia (itself originally of Prussian origins) to settlements in Canada. Old Colony Mennonites classified under the larger category of Old Order Mennonites.

Since Chortitza was the first Mennonite settlement in Russia (now modern Ukraine), it was known as the "Old Colony". In the course of the 19th century, the population of the Chortitza Colony multiplied, and daughter colonies were founded.

In 1875, the Old Colony Mennonite Church formed in Manitoba, Canada, and the Canadian community, whose church was officially known as the "Reinländer Mennoniten-Gemeinde", was still informally known by the old name. When members of the Old Colony Mennonites then moved from Canada to other places, the name was kept and they were called that way.

In March 1922, some Old Colony Mennonites moved to Mexico from Canada, to avoid Canada's draft and educational system.

By 1990, Old Colony Mennonite communities could be found in Mexico, Bolivia, Belize, Paraguay, Argentina, Canada, and the United States.

By 2013, the vast majority of Old Colony Mennonites lived in Mexico, where about 60% of the 100,000 Mennonites were affiliated with the Altkolonier Mennonitengemeinde and Bolivia, where about 75% of the 70,000 were affiliated with the Altkolonier Mennonitengemeinde. A smaller group lived in Belize, where about 50% of 10,000 were affiliated with the Altkolonier Mennonitengemeinde. Smaller groups of Old Colony Mennonites also lived in Paraguay, Argentina, Canada, Texas, and the US.

"The Old Colony Mennonites represent one of the purest survivals of the Brethren or Anabaptist wing of the Reformation"; and are typically more conservative than most other Russian and Ukrainian Mennonites in North America.

A number of Old Order Mennonites from North America travel to Latin America to aid in the support of Old Colony Mennonite schools there.

== See also ==
- Russian Mennonites
- Mennonite Brethren Church
- Reinland, Manitoba

== Literature ==
- Huttner, Jakob: Zwischen Eigen-art und Wirk-lichkeit : Die Altkolonie-Mennoniten im bolivianischen Chaco. Berlin 2012.
- Schartner, Sieghard and Schartner, Sylvia: Bolivien : Zufluchtsort der konservativen Mennoniten. Asunción 2009.
- Cañás Bottos, Lorenzo: Old Colony Mennonites in Argentina and Bolivia : Nation Making, Religious Conflict and Imagination of the Future. Leiden et al. 2008.
- Hedberg, Anna Sofia: Outside the world : Cohesion and Deviation among Old Colony Mennonites in Bolivia. Uppsala 2007.
- Will, Martina E.: The Old Colony Mennonite Colonization of Chihuahua and the Obregón Administration's Vision for the * Nation, San Diego 1993.
- Redekop, Calvin Wall: Old Colony Mennonites: Dilemmas of Ethnic Minority Life, Baltimore 1969.
