= Copper Bank =

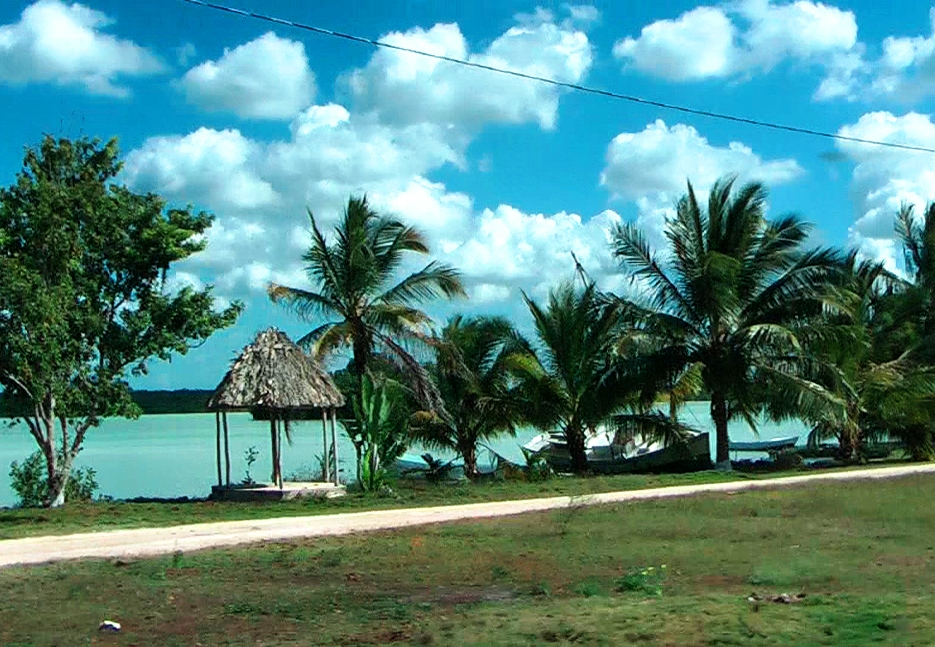
- Copper Bank Lagoon

- Location within Belize
- Coordinates: 18°19′16.09″N 88°21′21.17″W
- Country: Belize
- District: Corozal District
- Constituency: Corozal South East
- Elevation: 2 m (6.6 ft)
- Time zone: UTC-6 (Central)
- Climate: Aw

Copper Bank is a fishing village in the Corozal District of Belize. It is situated on the west bank of Laguna Seca, a shallow lagoon that empties into Chetumal Bay just north-east of the village. The closest settlement is Chunox, located approximately 1.25 miles away on the east bank of the Laguna Seca.

Access to the village is possible by road from Orange Walk, via the villages of San Estevan and Progresso. It is also possible to reach the village by road from Corozal, crossing the New River via the Pueblo Nuevo ferry, and from the populated community of Sarteneja, via a ferry across the mouth of Laguna Seca.

The village has been suggested as the site of a lost Mayan town, Uatibal, and several artifacts have been found in the vicinity.

== Demographics ==
At the time of the 2010 census, Copper Bank had a population of 470. Of these, 90.6% were Mestizo, 3.0% East Indian, 1.7% Yucatec Maya, 1.3% Ketchi Maya, 1.1% Creole, 1.1% Mixed, 0.6% Caucasian, 0.2% Garifuna and 0.2% Mennonite.

In terms of languages spoken (multiple answers allowed), 98.1% spoke Spanish, 50.2% English, 1.0% Creole, 1.0% Yucatec Maya, 0.2% Garifuna and 0.2% German; 0.2% could not speak.
