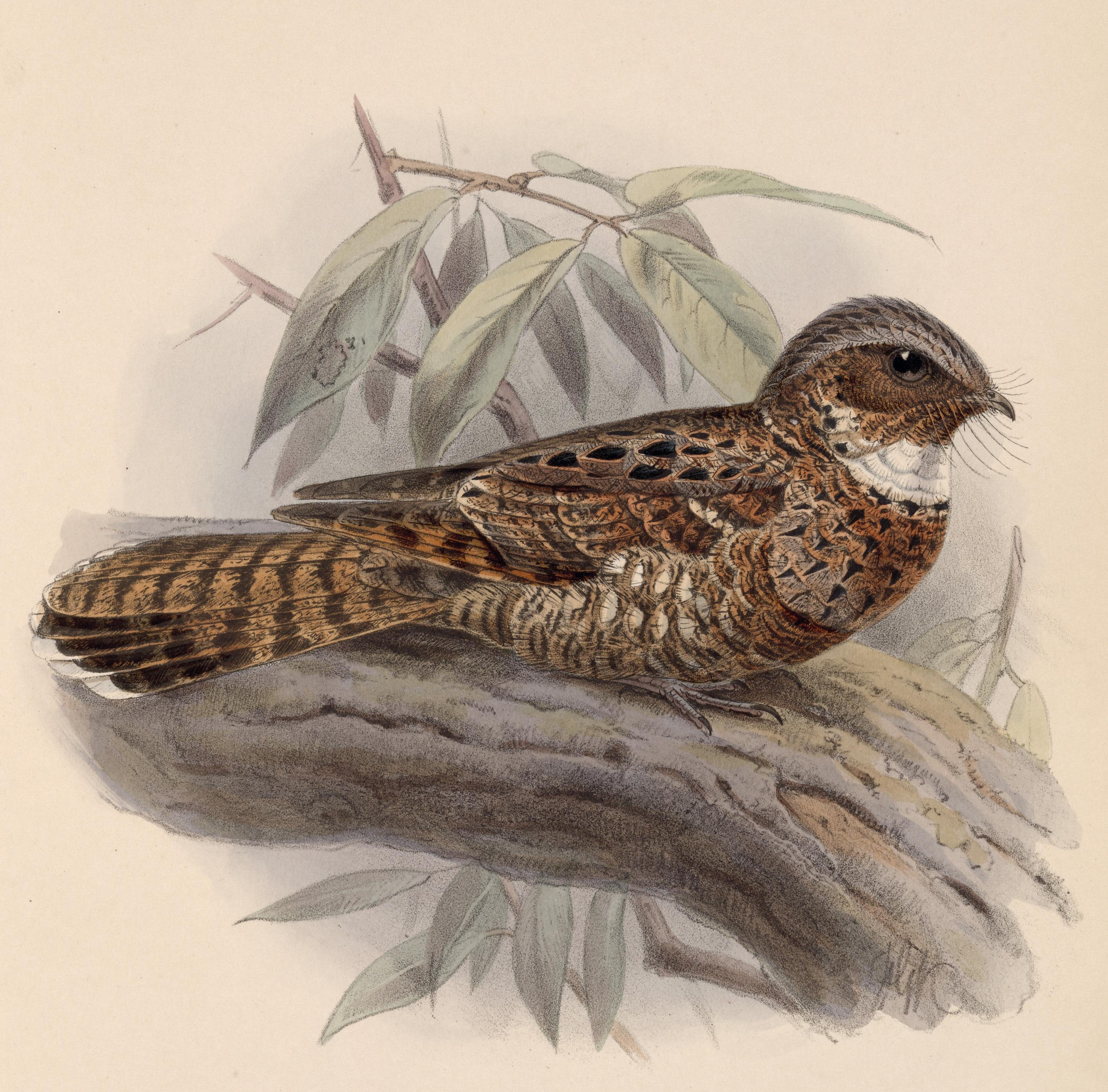

Conservation status
- Least Concern (IUCN 3.1)

Scientific classification
- Kingdom: Animalia
- Phylum: Chordata
- Class: Aves
- Order: Caprimulgiformes
- Family: Caprimulgidae
- Genus: Nyctiphrynus
- Species: N. yucatanicus

Binomial name
- Nyctiphrynus yucatanicus (Hartert, 1892)

= Yucatan poorwill =

Species of bird

The Yucatan poorwill (Nyctiphrynus yucatanicus) is a species of nightjar in the family Caprimulgidae. It is found in the Yucatán Peninsula of Belize, Guatemala, and Mexico.

== Taxonomy and systematics ==
The Yucatan poorwill has sometimes been placed in genus Otophanes, which was later merged into the current Nyctiphrynus. It, the ocellated poorwill (N. ocellatus), and the eared poorwill (N. mcleodii) are sister species. Especially it and the eared poorwill are believed to be the closest living relatives due to the similarity in songs and plumage characteristics. The Yucatan poorwill is monotypic.

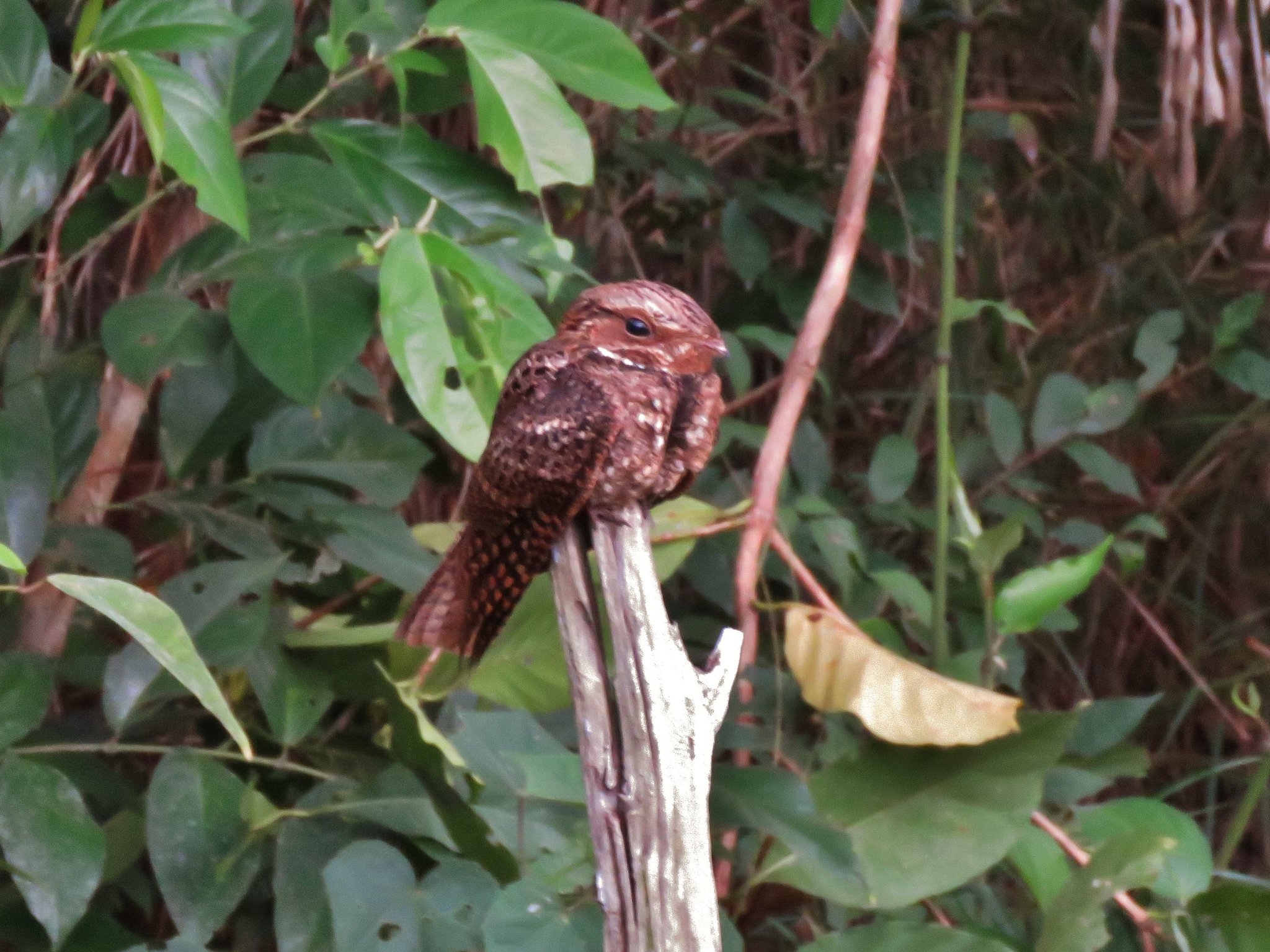
Yucatan poorwill in Belize

== Description ==
The Yucatan poorwill is 19.5 to 22 cm (7.7 to 8.7 in) long, making it the smallest species of nightjar in the Yucatán Peninsula. One male weighed 21.3 g (0.75 oz) and one female 27.7 g (0.98 oz). Both sexes have a brown morph; there is also a rufous morph that is much more prevalent among females. The former is mostly dark grayish brown with a variety of dusky, gray, and black vermiculation and streaks. Its face is dark sooty brown to brownish black with brown vermiculation. It has a faint buffy collar on its nape and a white patch on the throat. The underparts are brown and gray vermiculation with black streaks. The tail is dull black with grayish buffy marks and the wing is rounded. The four outer pairs of feathers have broad white tips. The rufous morph replaces the grayish brown base color with reddish brown. However, the coloration of plumage of the species is diverse.

A similar species, the eared poorwill (N. mcleodii), has longer wings, a distinct narrow collar on the hind neck, a rather plain upper body, a plainer lower body, and smaller white spots on the belly.

== Distribution and habitat ==
The Yucatan poorwill is found in the Yucatán Peninsula. In Mexico it occurs in the states of Campeche, Yucatán (except the northern coastal strip), and Quintana Roo. Its range extends into northeastern Guatemala and northern Belize. In the Shipstern Wildlife Reserve area of Belize, the yucatan poorwill has been observed to be inhabiting all year round and is usually found in small groups (less than 10) in specific habitats. In elevation it ranges from sea level to about 250 m (820 ft). It inhabits a variety of landscapes including the interiors and edges of tropical, humid, and semi-humid forest as well as scrublands. It also appears to be abundant in deciduous forest, but one observation reveals that it is not commonly found in secondary shrubby forests in tropical rainforests. Its habitat is still not well known.

== Behavior ==
=== Feeding ===
The Yucatan poorwill is crepuscular and nocturnal. It forages at night in an open area and forages by sallying from a perch in a tree and perhaps from the ground. Its prey is insects but details are not known.

=== Breeding ===
The Yucatan poorwill's clutch of two eggs is laid directly on the ground without a nest. Its breeding season is from April to June in Guatemala. Although the species and the eared poorwill (N. mcleodii) are hard to distinguish, their eggs are different in color. While the eggs of N. yucatanicus have been described as yellowish-beige with brown spots, the eggs of N. mcleodii have been described as ivory white with no spots.

When an intruder approaches the nest, the adult incubating eggs may try to keep the intruder away from the nest by making it look like the adult is injured when it lands (an injury-feigning distraction display) some distance from the nest. Essentially nothing else is known about its breeding phenology.

=== Vocalization ===
The Yucatan poorwill's song is "a loud, slightly resonant whirr or whirrrr". It is given at night from a tree perch, mostly between February and October. It also makes "a slightly liquid, at times accelerating puk-puk...and a sharp week week week in flight". The latter is thought to be an alarm call. The song has been confused with the song of the yucatan nightjar (Caprimulgus badius).

Its song is simple and repetitive. It starts a little above 1kHz, peaks at 2.2kHz, and drops to 1kHz. Each song lasts for around 0.3 seconds with intervals of 1.5 - 1.8 seconds (see Figure 2 in Hardy & Straneck, 1989).

== Status ==
The IUCN originally assessed the Yucatan poorwill as Near Threatened but since 2004 has rated it as being of Least Concern. It has a large range and is generally fairly common to common, though its population is believed to be declining. No immediate threats have been identified.
