= St. Viator Vocational High School =

Catholic secondary school in Belize

Coordinates: 18°18′14.89″N 88°19′48.57″W

Information
- School type: High School
- Religious affiliation: Roman Catholic
- Established: 2004; 22 years ago

St. Viator Vocational High School is a Roman Catholic High School managed by St. Francis Xavier Parish in the Corozal District of Belize. It is located 1.5 miles beyond Chunox on the Chunox Sarteneja road.

== History ==
St. Viator opened in August 2004 on land formerly used as an agricultural center. The center included four classroom buildings constructed with poverty alleviation funds from the UK.

Viatorian Christopher Glancy, later auxiliary bishop of Belize, was instrumental in the founding of St. Viator during his time as pastor of Xavier parish in Corozal. Its focus was to be agriculture and tourism. The Viatorian community added another eight-classroom building and equipped the facility with agricultural machinery and labs for science, computers, and home economics.

The namesake of the Viatorians, St. Viator, was a lector or a catechist at the cathedral of Lyons and close associate of St. Justus in fourth century France. As a fruit of Viatorian efforts a resident of Chunox, Fr. Moses Mesh, was ordained a priest for Belize in 2011.

== Today ==
St. Viator has been making secondary education accessible and affordable to the community of the southeastern Corozal District since its inception. The enrollment is just over 130 students and there are 5 faculty and 3 auxiliary staff. Mr. Marconie Moh serves as Principal of Chunox St. Viator and Mr. Francisco Magaña as chairman, Board of Management.
