= Payal Ghanwani =

Belizean senator

Payal Ghanwani is a Belizean attorney who served as a Senator from 10 March 2020 to 11 December 2020. She is the first Indo-Belizean Senator.

== Education ==
Ghanwani grew up in Corozal District, Belize. She graduated from the University of the West Indies at Cave Hill with an LL.B in 2014. She then earned her Legal Education Certificate at the Norman Manley Law School, where she was recognised as the Most Outstanding Student Over Two Years (2014–2016). She was called to the bar in Belize in 2016.

== Career ==
Ghanwani is a partner at the firm Estevan Perera & Company LLP. She had previously worked as an attorney-at-law for Glenn D. Godfrey & Co. LLP and as an intern at M. H. Chebat & Co. She is also the membership director for the Rotary Club of Belize Sunrise, which is based in Belize City.

Ghanwani has worked in several areas, including civil litigation and estate issues. Notably, she served as the main attorney for United Democratic Party (UDP) politician Mark King in his 2018 libel suit against activist Moses Sulph. Sulph had made a post on Facebook alleging that employees in King's business were not paid overtime pay and mandated benefits; he made a second post repeating the allegations after King asked him to retract. In court, Sulph's witnesses could not corroborate the posts, and he had no other evidence. In January 2019, the judge ruled that Sulph based his posts on hearsay, and awarded King BZ$40,000 in damages. This case set a precedent for online defamation cases in Belize.

In 2020, the incumbent UDP appointed Ghanwani as one of their six Senators upon the resignation of UDP Senator Steven Duncan. While Ghanwani was not known within the party, she was viewed favorably as a "new face". She also became the first Indo-Belizean to serve in the Senate. Ghanwani was sworn in on 10 March 2020. After the 2020 general election, the UDP became the opposition party. As their Senate allotment was now only three seats, Ghanwani was not reappointed for the new legislative session that began on 11 December 2020.
