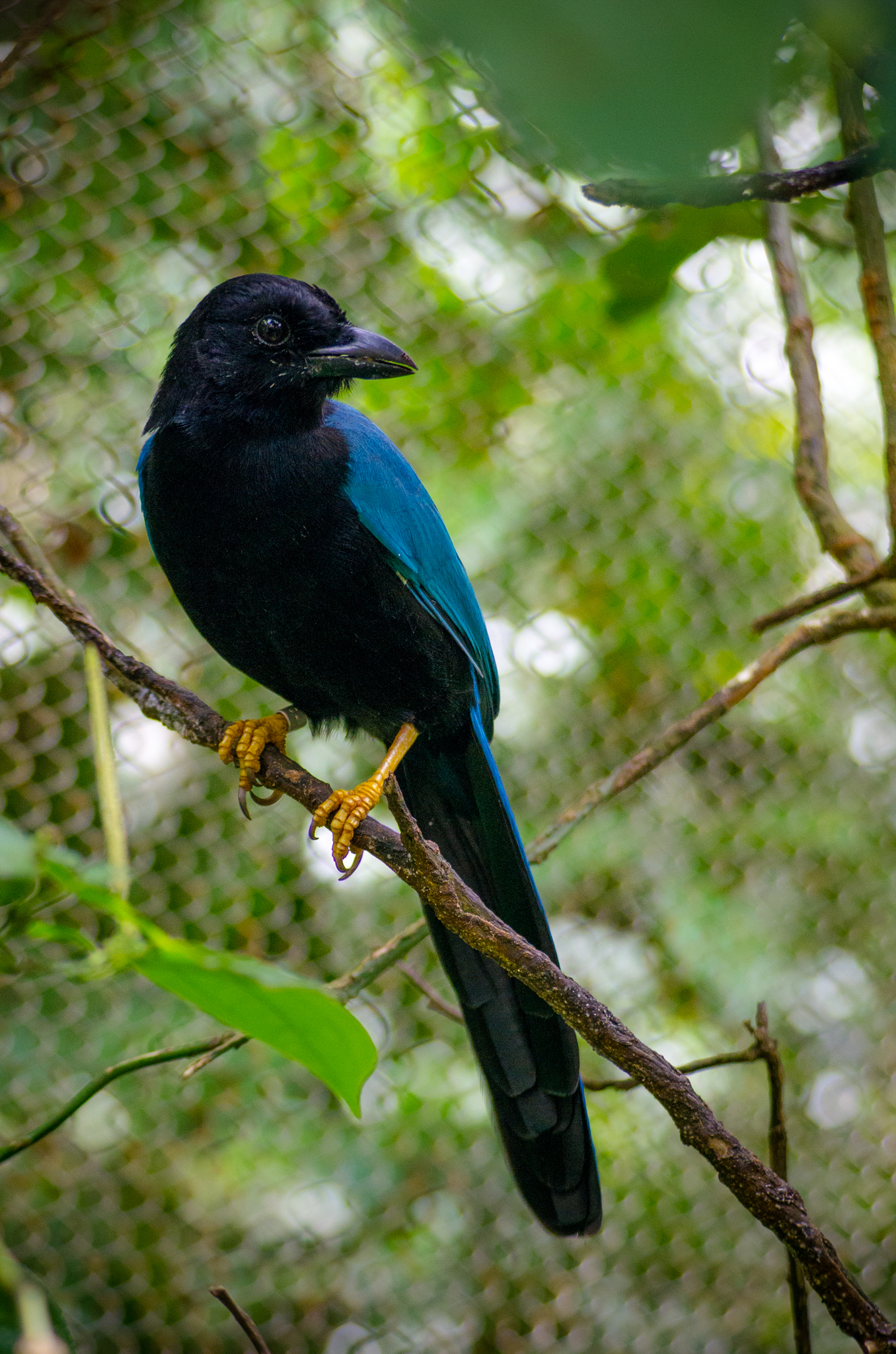
- Adult in Mexico

Conservation status
- Least Concern (IUCN 3.1)

Scientific classification
- Kingdom: Animalia
- Phylum: Chordata
- Class: Aves
- Order: Passeriformes
- Family: Corvidae
- Genus: Cyanocorax
- Species: C. yucatanicus

Binomial name
- Cyanocorax yucatanicus (Dubois, 1875)
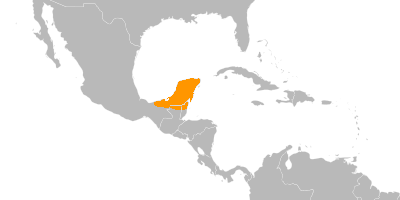
- Range (year-round)

= Yucatan jay =

Species of bird

The Yucatan jay (Cyanocorax yucatanicus) is a species of bird in the family Corvidae, the crows and their allies. It is native to the Yucatán Peninsula where its habitats are subtropical or tropical dry forest, plantations and cleared areas at altitudes up to 250 m (820 ft). Adults are about 30 cm (12 in) long, black, with blue wings, mantle, and tail, black bills, yellow eye rings and legs. Immature birds have yellow bills. This is a common species of jay with a wide range and the International Union for Conservation of Nature has rated its conservation status as being of "least concern".

== Taxonomy ==
The Yucatan jay was first described by the naturalist Alphonse Dubois in 1875. It originally places in the genus Cyanocitta, and was given the scientific name Cyanocitta yucatanica. It is now placed by the genus Cyanocorax, which was introduced by the German zoologist Friedrich Boie in 1826, as Cyanocorax yucatanicus. In 1934, ornithologist Carl Eduard Hellmayr reorganized the genus Cyanocorax and split it into four subgenera. The Yucatan jay was placed into the subgenus Cissilopha as Cissilopha yucatanica. This is now considered a synonym for the Yucatan jay.

When Hellmayr created the subgenus Cissilopha, he placed the bushy-crested jay, the San Blas jay, and the purplish-backed jay into it along with the Yucatan jay based on their similar plumage. This relationship was confirmed by a 2010 mitochondrial DNA study, which showed that these four species were closely related. The Yucatan jay is basal to a sister group formed by the San Blas jay and the Purplish-backed jay.

The following cladogram (simplified from the 2010 study) shows the relationship between species in the genus Cyanocorax.

- - Inca jay (C. yncas)
  - White-tailed jay (C. mystacalis)
  - - - - - - - - Cayenne jay (C. cayanus)
              - - Plush-crested jay (C. chrysops)
                - White-naped jay (C. cyanopogon)
            - - Azure-naped jay (C. heilprini)
              - Black-chested jay (C. affinis)
          - Tufted jay (C. dickeyi)
        - - Bushy-crested jay (C. melanocyaneus)
          - - Yucatan jay (C. yucatanicus)
            - - San Blas jay (C. sanblasianus)
              - Purplish-backed jay (C. beecheii)

The Yucatan jay has two recognized subspecies.

- C. yucataniucs yucatanicus: Found in Yucatán, Quintana Roo, and Campeche (except the southwest portion) in southeastern Mexico; Petén in northern Guatemala; and northern Belize.
- C. yucatanicus rivularis: Found in Tabasco and southwestern Campeche in southeastern Mexico. Somewhat larger, and with a silvery tinge to the blue upperparts.

== Description ==
The adult Yucatan jay has a black head, nape, and underparts. The back, wings, and tail are a sharp blue colour. It has black irises, black eye rings, a black beak, and yellow legs and feet. There is no difference between the sexes.

=== Moults ===
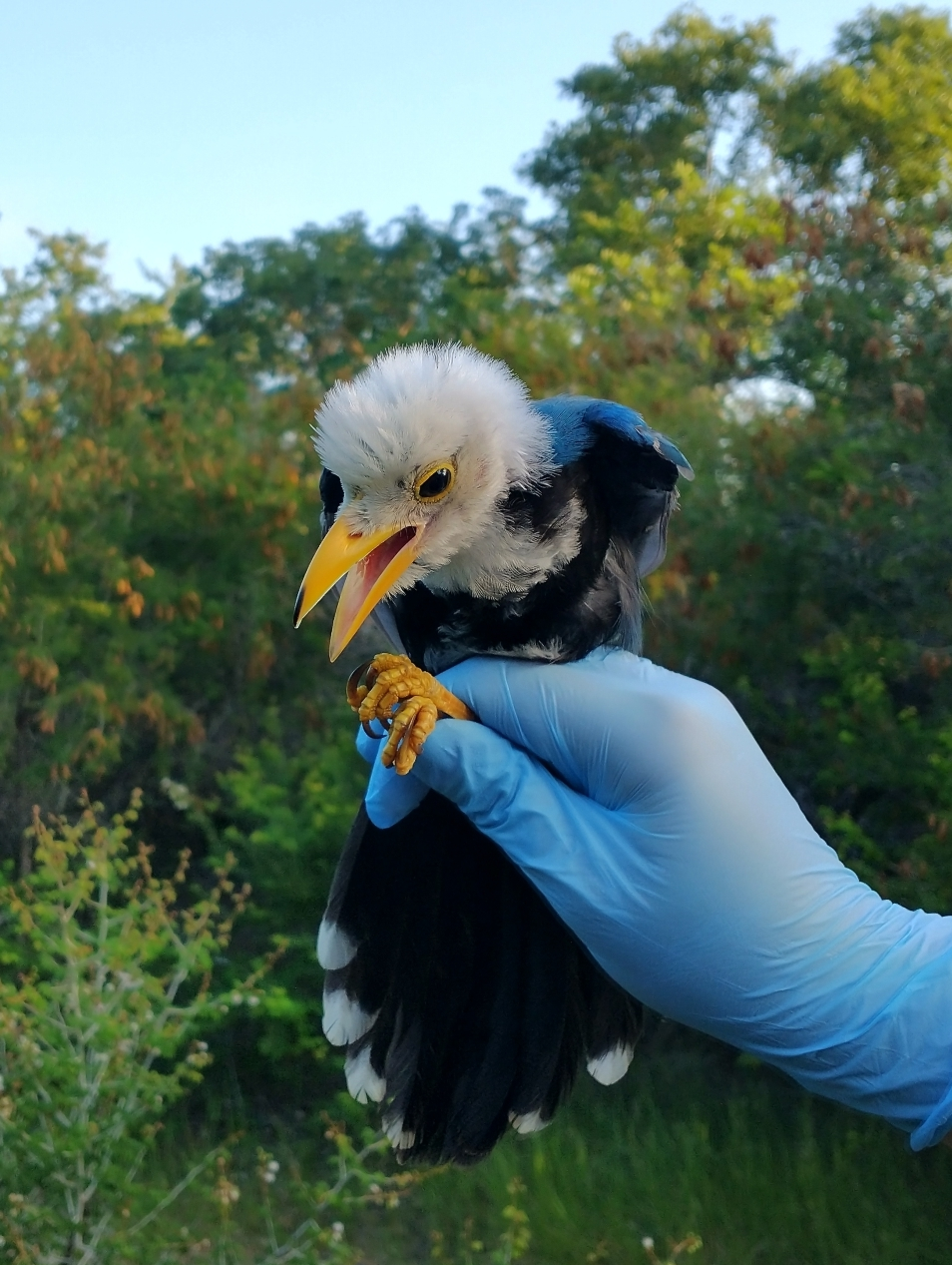
Juveniles have distinct white heads and bodies, but this fades within a few weeks of fledging

The Yucatan jay has several distinct plumages throughout its life cycle. Juvenile Yucatan jays have a white head, body, and tail tip. The back is a soft blue, and the wings and tail are a soft grey, aside from the outer rectrices which are white. The beak, legs, and feet are a soft yellow tinged with pink. The inside of the beak is white and the irises are dark brown. These features start to fade a few weeks after they fledge. At this point, the legs, feet, beak, and eye ring become more distinctly yellow. The prebasic moult also begins at this point, with the white head and body feathers being replaced with black ones.

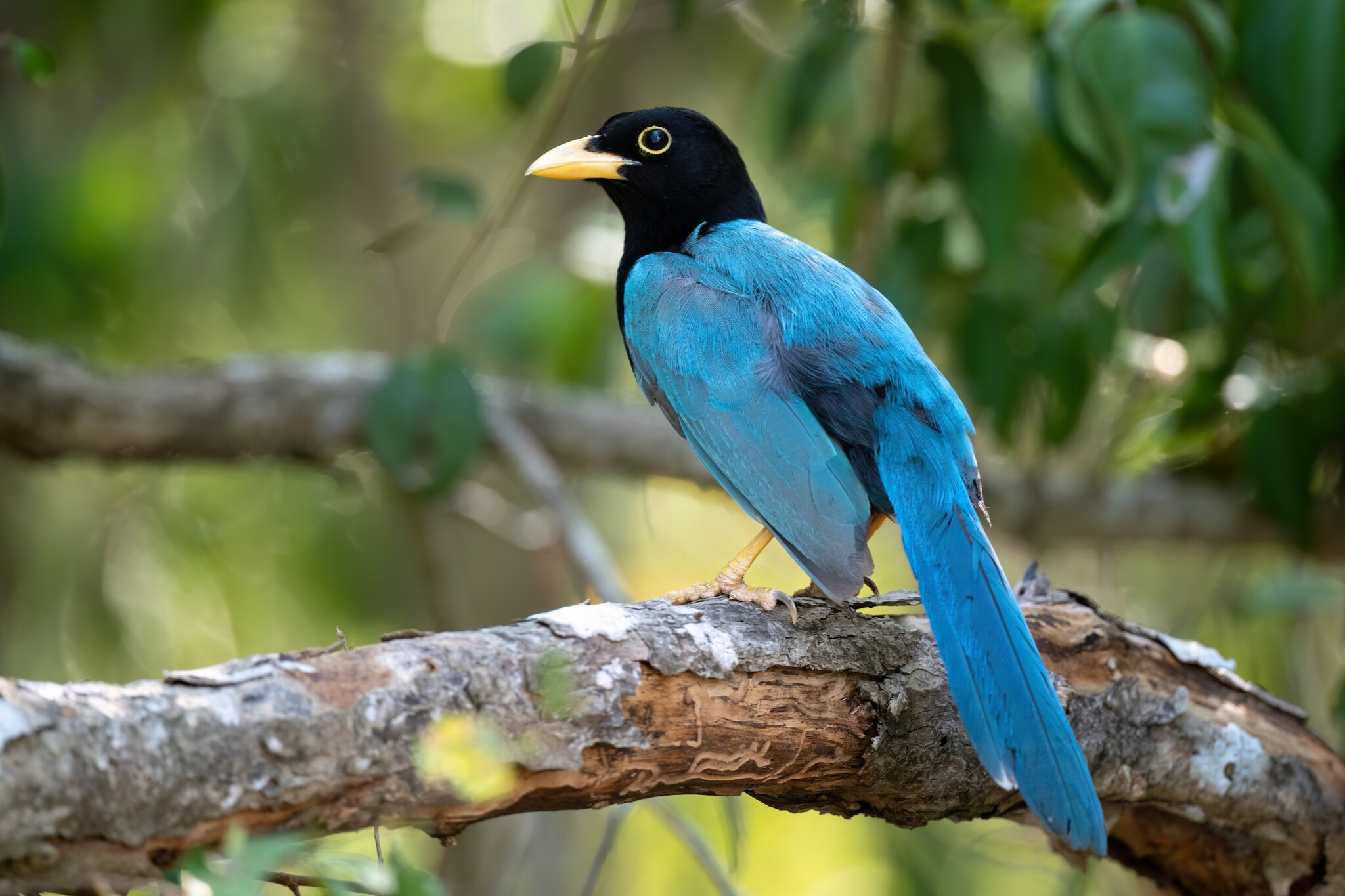
The yellow beak and eye rings begin to fade to black within their second year

During the first year, the Yucatan jay has an entirely black head and body. The legs, feet, and eye rings remain yellow. The inside of the beak remains white, but takes on a glaucous tone. The wings become bluer, and the tail becomes a purplish blue colour. The back and tail turn a deeper grey, and the rectrices are tipped with white. In June or August, the bill may start to develop dark patches, while remaining overall yellow. In September, the dark patches expand further.

In its second year, the Yucatan jay's plumage is the same as that of the adult. The beak is still mottled, and by March it is primarily black with only some yellow marks, becoming entirely black within the second year. The legs and feet remain yellow. The eye ring is still distinctive of age, with some black marks appearing on the otherwise yellow flesh. By the third year, this eye ring is almost entirely black. The darkening of the beak and eye ring usually progress at the same rate. The inside of the beak starts to darken at this point as well. Any trace of yellow on both the beak and eye rings are gone by January of the third year. In the fourth year and later, the Yucatan jay has reached its full adult plumage.

=== Measurements ===
The Yucatan jay is a medium sized jay, averaging 31–33 cm (12–13 in) long. There is some variation in size between the sexes. The average wing length for adults is 141 mm (5.6 in) for males and 139.5 mm (5.49 in) for females, and the average tail length is 142.5 mm (5.61 in) for males and 141.5 mm (5.57 in) for females. Both sexes have an average beak length of 22.5 mm (0.89 in), an average beak depth of 12.7 mm (0.50 in), and average tarsus length of 41 mm (1.6 in), and an average middle toe length of 25 mm (0.98 in). The male is also slightly heavier, weighing 114.4–127.8 g (4.04–4.51 oz) compared to the female who weighs 105.4–121 g (3.72–4.27 oz).

=== Similar species ===
The Yucatan jay is visually unique within its range, with no similar species. Outside of its range, it is similar to the San Blas jay, the purplish-backed jay, and the bushy-crested jay. All three have a yellow iris whereas the Yucatan jay has a black iris, and are a brighter shade of blue on their upperparts.

== Range and habitat ==
The Yucatan jay is found primarily in the Yucatán Peninsula, which comprises the northern part of the nation of Belize; Guatemala's northern El Petén Department; and the Mexican states of Yucatán, Quintana Roo, and Campeche. It is also present in parts of the neighbouring states of Chiapas and Tabasco.

The habitats of the Yucatan Jay vary slightly depending on the subspecies. The nominate species (C. y. yucatanicus) is found most often in both humid and scrubby forests, but can also be found in coastal scrub. C. y. rivularis, found in the southwest portion of the Yucatan peninsula, can be found in almost any type of forest. It can also be found in pine forests and swamps, however it is not common in these areas. Both subspecies can be found at elevations up to 500 m (1,600 ft). The Yucatan jay is non-migratory.

== Status ==
The Yucatan jay is a common species throughout most of its wide range. Its population is considered stable, and as of 2020 there are an estimated 50,000–500,000 mature individuals in the wild. No particular threats have been identified, and the International Union for Conservation of Nature has rated its conservation status as being of least concern.
