= Shipstern Conservation & Management Area =

- IUCN category II (national park)
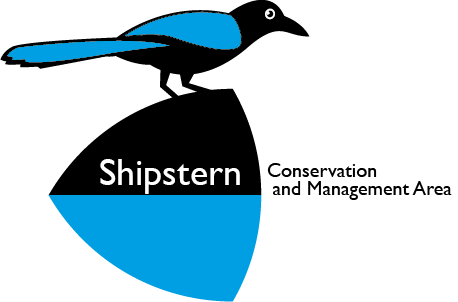

- Location within Belize
- Location: Corozal District, Belize
- Nearest city: Sarteneja
- Coordinates: 18°19′04″N 88°11′31″W
- Area: 21,500 acres (87 km^{2})
- Established: 1990
- Governing body: Corozal Sustainable Future Initiative
- Website: www.visitshipstern.com

Shipstern Conservation and Management Area (Shipstern C&MA) is a protected area located in the Corozal District of northeastern Belize.

Shipstern C&MA protects approximately 21.500 acres (c. 8.700 hectares or 87 km^{2}) of a variety of habitats centered on Shipstern Lagoon, one of the larger inland lagoon systems in Belize. The reserve includes non-contiguous parcels, a larger one covering part of the lagoon itself, and a smaller one protected a small forest lake by the name of Xo-Pol. Habitats include various types of seasonal forests, some of which are unique for Belize. Next to the medium-sized semi-deciduous Yucatan forest, a much rarer type of dry coastal tropical forest also occurs, in Belize found only in Shipstern and in Bacalar Chico National Park, on Ambergris Caye. The government of Belize considers Shipstern Conservation & Management Area to be one of the ten most important nature reserves in Belize.

Shipstern C&MA is owned and managed by the Corozal Sustainable Future Initiative (CSFI) a Belizean registered NGO financed in larger part by a consortium of European zoos, through a charity, the International Tropical Conservation Fund (ITCFund).

== History ==
The Shipstern Conservation & Management Area, formerly known as Shipstern Nature Reserve, was officially opened by the Minister of Natural Resources in September 1990. Long recognized as being of the more important private protected areas due its geographic position and its biodiversity, it has appeared on official maps ever since its inception. In 2012, the Corozal Sustainable Future Initiative entered the reserve into a trust in perpetuity, whereby on the one hand the owner CSFI commits to manage the reserve as an IUCN Category II national park, and the Government of Belize, on the other hand, has included Shipstern C&MA in the National Protected Area System of Belize.

The name Shipstern reportedly derives from a village within Shipstern forest that was abandoned after the devastating passage of Hurricane Janet in 1955. It may have designated a point in the Lagoon where logging boats could go no further ("ship's turn"), but other origins for the name have been locally known. The name Shipstern today has been given to the lagoon, the forest where the village used to be, as well as to the unexcavated Mayan ceremonial centre just South of Shipstern C&MA.

In 1986, the parcel of land which was to become Shipstern was purchased by English businessman and butterfly enthusiast Clive Farrell. He created (at what today still is the headquarters of the protected area) a butterfly production centre designed to supply various butterfly exhibits in the United Kingdom. In 1989, unable to sustain further the costs of maintaining and protecting such a large area, he sold the land to the freshly created International Tropical Conservation Fund. Although butterfly production was continued for a few years, the strong dry season made the operation economically unviable. The original breeding area is now an exhibit which still produces some butterflies for tourism purposes.

== Governance ==
The Shipstern Conservation & Management Area is owned and managed by the Corozal Sustainable Future Initiative (CSFI). This registered NGO of Belize was previously known as Shipstern Nature Reserve (Belize) Ltd, a not-for profit company created in the early nineties by the International Tropical Conservation Fund. It was rebranded in 2012, when Shipstern C&MA was entered into a trust in perpetuity for the benefit of the People and Government of Belize. The board of directors of CSFI consists of 10 members, of which two are representatives of the Ministry of Forestry, Fisheries and Sustainable Development and the Ministry of Natural Resources. Other members include leading conservationists at heart or by trade. Since 2008, CSFI's executive director is Heron Moreno.

In 2012, the Corozal Sustainable Future Initiative proposed to the Government of Belize to help manage the Honey Camp National Park and the Freshwater Creek Forest Reserve, two contiguous protected areas located to the South West of Shipstern, both at risk or in the process of witnessing illegal agricultural encroachment. In 2013, CSFI and the Government of Belize signed co-managements agreement for both areas. In terms of management, CSFI has a three-pronged approach, namely conservation, tourism and sustainable forest management. Its team consists of approximately 15 members of staff, of which most are polyvalent. Tasks include foremost wardening, to ensure the integrity of the protected areas, but also include, research, forestry, tourism, community engagement and environmental education. The offices of CSFI are located at Shipstern headquarters, and no other office exists. The legal seat of the organization is in Belize City.

== Flora ==
The flora and vegetation of the Shipstern Conservation & Management Area is diverse and often unique for Belize, as shown by several studies carried out in the 1990s. The vegetation north of Shipstern Lagoon is the most diverse in terms of vegetation types, which are often intertwined in a complex mosaic. Shipstern harbours several types of forests, the most noteworthy being the Yucatan semi-deciduous medium-sized forest (following Mexican terminology) and the Pseudophoenix Palm dry coastal forest. This latter forest type has a very limited range not only in Belize bit also on the Yucatan Peninsula, while also having a very patchy distribution.

Forests in Shipstern are still recovering from the devastating effects of Hurricane Janet in 1955. Although still secondary in stature, the forests within Shipstern have been regenerating with hardly any disturbance since Hurricane Janet. In view of the widespread deforestation and degradation of forests in northeastern Belize over the past three decades, these forest certainly now rank among the most pristine still to be found in this part of the country.

== Fauna ==
Until recent years, fauna was still abundant in northeastern Belize, not only thanks to the large extent of forests, but also thanks to the fact that the Shipstern area was long isolated and only really reachable by sea, However, deforestation in recent decades and particularly since 2005 has affected wildlife. Shipstern as well as the other protected areas managed by CSFI have become the last refuges for fauna in the northeastern part of Belize. In Shipstern, fauna is still very diverse, with almost 300 species of birds, among which many Yucatan endemics, as well as many species of mammals, reptiles and amphibians.

=== Mammals ===
All five cat species of Belize (jaguar, puma, ocelot, margay & jaguarundi) occur and are still fairly regularly seen. Other mammals include two species of peccaries, two species of deer, tayra, white-nosed coatis, Yucatan squirrel, Mexican anteaters, the endangered Baird's tapir, among many other small mammals, including 22 species of bats.

Monkeys are no longer present, probably due to the devastating effects of Hurricane Janet in 1955. In recent years, a small population of 21 black howler monkeys (in Belize commonly known as baboon) was reintroduced in the Shipstern forest.

=== Birds ===
Thanks to its variety of habitats and its geographic position between the drier Yucatan and more humid Central American forests types, Shipstern hosts a large number of bird species, many of which are Yucatan endemics and can, in Belize, only be seen in Shipstern. Extensive research has shown that close to 300 species inhabit the area, among which the keel-billed toucan, the lineated woodpecker or the Yucatan jay (in Belize commonly known as Yucatan blue jay).

In 1992, the American woodstorks returned as a breeding species to Shipstern Lagoon, and specific conservation measures were implemented to protect colonies. Over the years, these reached up to several hundred birds, but recently breeding has become erratic, which may be linked to water level fluctuations caused by human activities. Shipstern is the only known mainland habitat of the black catbird.

=== Reptiles and amphibians ===
78 different species of reptiles and amphibians have been documented in Shipstern Conservation & Management Area. They include salamanders, frogs, toad, iguanas, snakes and the Morelet's crocodile (Crocodylus moreletii). Due to overharvesting, the Mexican musk turtle (Staurotypus triporcatus) has probably disappeared from the area. Other turtles, among which the scorpion mud turtle (Kinosternon scorpioides), the furrowed wood turtle (Rhinoclemmys areolata) or the white-lipped mud turtle (Kinosternon leucostomum), are still fairly common.

=== Fish ===
The aquatic systems of Shipstern also consist in a mosaic of many habitats, differentiated by their permanent or temporary status, as well as salinity. Many species of fish seem to show high degrees of adaptability to either fresh or saline water. In forest pools, species typical of flowing streams are found, which suggest a vast underground aquifer connectivity. The critically endangered sawfish, of which several unconfirmed sightings have been reported, is most certainly extinct in the Shipstern Lagoon.

=== Arthropods ===
122 different butterfly species belonging to swallowtails (Papilionidae), whites (Pierinae) and brush-footed butterflies (Nymphalidae) have been recorded. A further 21 different grossamer-winged butterflies (Lycaenidae) and 51 skipper butterflies (Hesperiidae) were also documented over the years. Estimates put the number of species of butterflies at 300 of which around 10% are, in Belize, only to be found in the area. Adult butterfly diversity seems to be highest at the onset of the dry season, early in the year. Another peak seems to occur in August, during the small dry season.

==== Hawk-moth ====
49 different hawk-moths have been identified in the area. Some, like Manduca wellingi, are common for the drier Yucatan vegetation types, while others, like Agrius cingulata or Xylophanes tersa inhabit the tropical rainforest within Shipstern.

==== Silk moths ====
16 species of silk moths were recorded, most of them belonging to the families Ceratocampinae and Hemileucinae. Members of Arsenurinae and Saturniinae sub-families have also been documented, but they seem less common.

==== Odonata ====
A total number of 54 different dragonflies (Zygoptera) and damselflies (Zygoptera) were recorded for the Shipstern Conservation & Management Area.
