= Gabriel Martinez =

Gabriel Martinez may refer to:

- Gabriel Martínez (footballer) (born 1958), Colombian football left-back
- Gabriel Martinez (artist) (born 1967), Cuban-American artist
- Gabriel Martínez Poch (born 1965), Argentine football coach
- Gabri Martínez (born 2003), Spanish football forward
- Gabriel Martinez (politician) (fl. 2008), Belizean politician
