= Corozal South West =

Electoral constituency in Belize

- Constituency for the Belize House of Representatives
- District: Corozal
- Electorate: 5,979 (2015)
- Major settlements: Louisville, San Narciso

Current constituency
- Created: 1984
- Party: People's United Party
- Area Representative: Ramiro Ramirez

Corozal South West
- Constituency for the Belize House of Representatives
- District: Corozal

Current constituency

Corozal South West is an electoral constituency in the Corozal District represented in the House of Representatives of the National Assembly of Belize.

== Area representatives ==
Election	Area representative	Party
1984	Asterio Ortega	UDP
1989	Asterio Ortega	UDP
1993	Gregorio Garcia	PUP
1998	Gregorio Garcia	PUP
2003	Gabriel Martinez	UDP
2008	Gabriel Martinez	UDP
2012	Ramiro Ramirez	PUP
2015	Angel Campos	UDP
2020	Ramiro Ramirez	PUP

== Elections ==
Election	Political result	Candidate	Party	Votes	%	±%
2025 general election Electorate: 6,424; Turnout: 5,034 (78.36%) −8.77	PUP hold Majority: 681 (13.53%) -1.31	Ramiro Ramirez	PUP	2,830	56.22	-0.69
2025 general election Electorate: 6,424; Turnout: 5,034 (78.36%) −8.77	PUP hold Majority: 681 (13.53%) -1.31	Martin Rivera	UDP	2,149	42.69	+0.62
