= Calcutta, Belize =

Calcutta
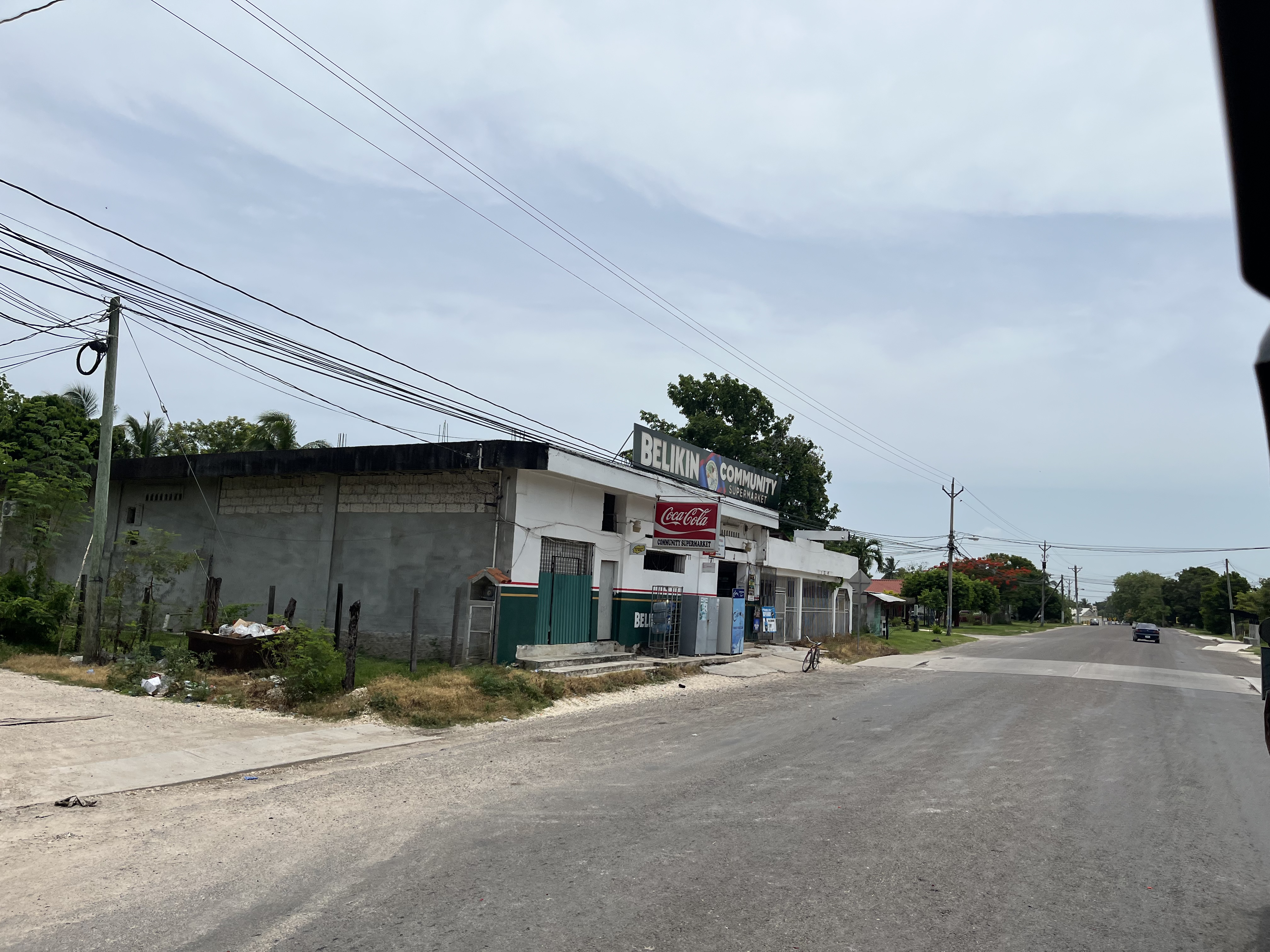

- Location within Belize
- Coordinates: 18°21′N 88°26′W
- Country: Belize
- District: Corozal District
- Constituency: Corozal South East
- Named for: Kolkata, West Bengal, India
- Time zone: UTC-6 (Central)

Calcutta is a village in the Corozal District of Belize.

== Demographics ==
At the time of the 2010 census, Calcutta had a population of 846. Of these, 59.3% were Mestizo, 25.5% East Indian, 10.4% Creole, 3.7% Mixed, 0.5% Caucasian, 0.1% African, 0.1% Garifuna, 0.1% Ketchi Maya, 0.1% Yucatec Maya and 0.1% Mennonite.

In terms of languages spoken (multiple answers allowed), 80.5% spoke Spanish, 69.7% English, 60.6% Creole, 0.3% Garifuna, 0.1% Yucatec Maya and 0.1% other languages; 0.1% could not speak.

== History ==
After the British put down the Sepoy Mutiny in India, the British Parliament ordered 1000 Indians who had supported the rebellion removed from India and transported to British Honduras. They worked on plantations in Corozal District, and Calcutta was one of the settlements they founded.
