= San Pedro, Corozal =

Village in Corozal District, Belize

San Pedro is a small village in the Corozal District in the nation of Belize. It is part of the Corozal North constituency.

== Demographics ==
At the time of the 2010 census, San Pedro had a population of 520. Of these, 89.6% were Mestizo, 6.5% Yucatec Maya, 2.7% Mixed, 0.6% Ketchi Maya, 0.2% Creole, 0.2% Hindu and 0.2% Mennonite.

In terms of languages spoken (multiple answers allowed), 95.7% spoke Spanish, 40.8% English, 14.2% Yucatec Maya, 0.4% Ketchi Maya, 0.2% Creole and 0.2% other languages; 0.6% could not speak.
