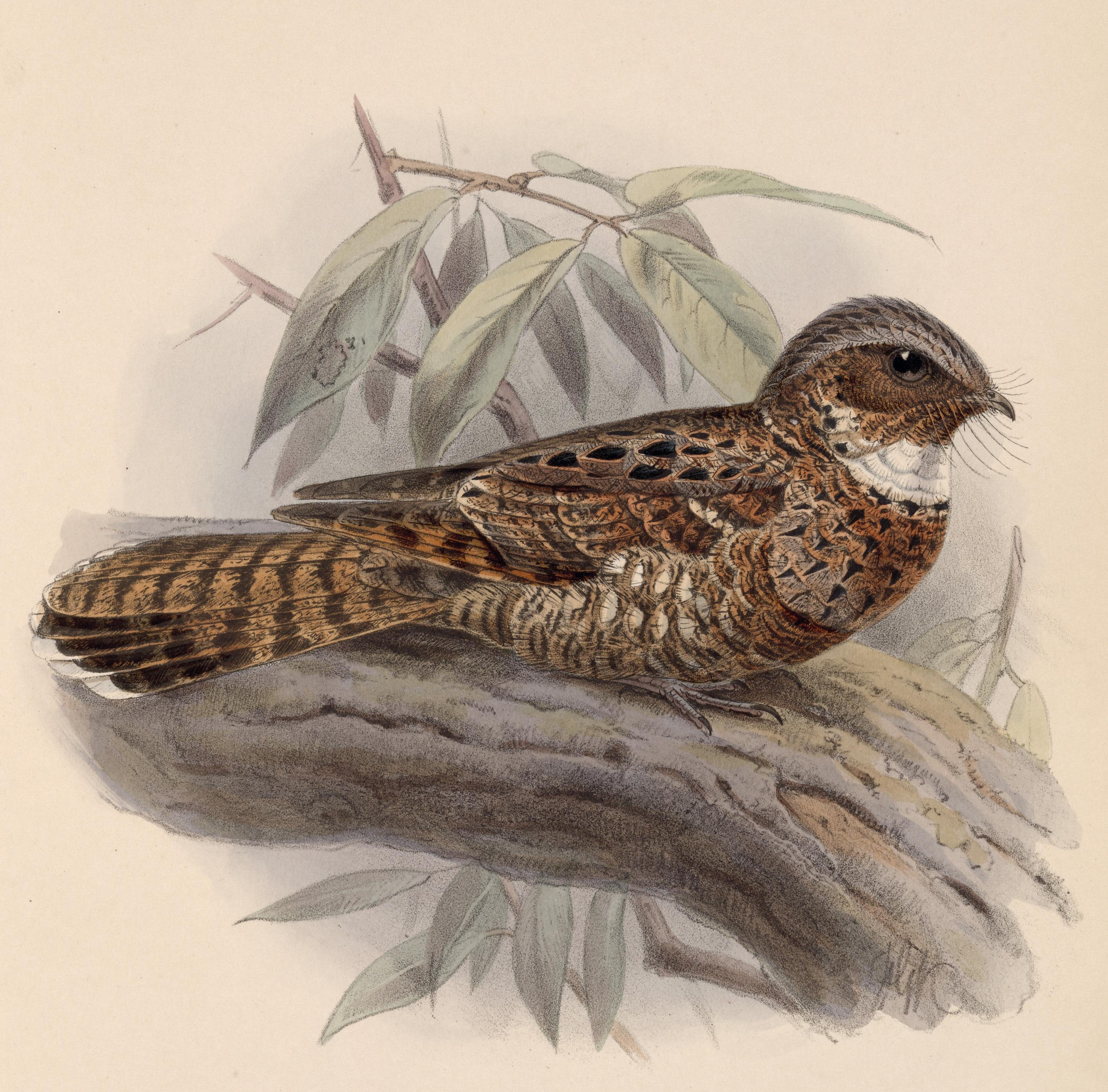
- Yucatan poorwill (Nyctiphrynus yucatanicus)

Scientific classification
- Domain: Eukaryota
- Kingdom: Animalia
- Phylum: Chordata
- Class: Aves
- Clade: Strisores
- Order: Caprimulgiformes
- Family: Caprimulgidae
- Subfamily: Caprimulginae
- Genus: Nyctiphrynus; Bonaparte, 1857

Type species
- Caprimulgus ocellatus Tschudi, 1844

= Nyctiphrynus =

Genus of birds

Nyctiphrynus is a genus of birds in the nightjar family Caprimulgidae that are found in Middle and South America.

== Taxonomy ==
The genus Nyctiphrynus was introduced in 1847 by the French naturalist Charles Lucien Bonaparte. He listed three species in the genus but did not specify the type species. In 1914 Harry C. Oberholser designated Caprimulgus ocellatus Tschudi, 1844, the ocellated poorwill, as the type. The genus name Nyctiphrynus is derived from the Ancient Greek νυκτι-/nukti- meaning "night-" or "nocturnal" and φρυνη/phrunē meaning "toad".

The genus contains the following four species:

- Eared poorwill (Nyctiphrynus mcleodii)
- Ocellated poorwill (Nyctiphrynus ocellatus)
- Chocó poorwill (Nyctiphrynus rosenbergi)
- Yucatan poorwill (Nyctiphrynus yucatanicus)
