= Belize–India relations =

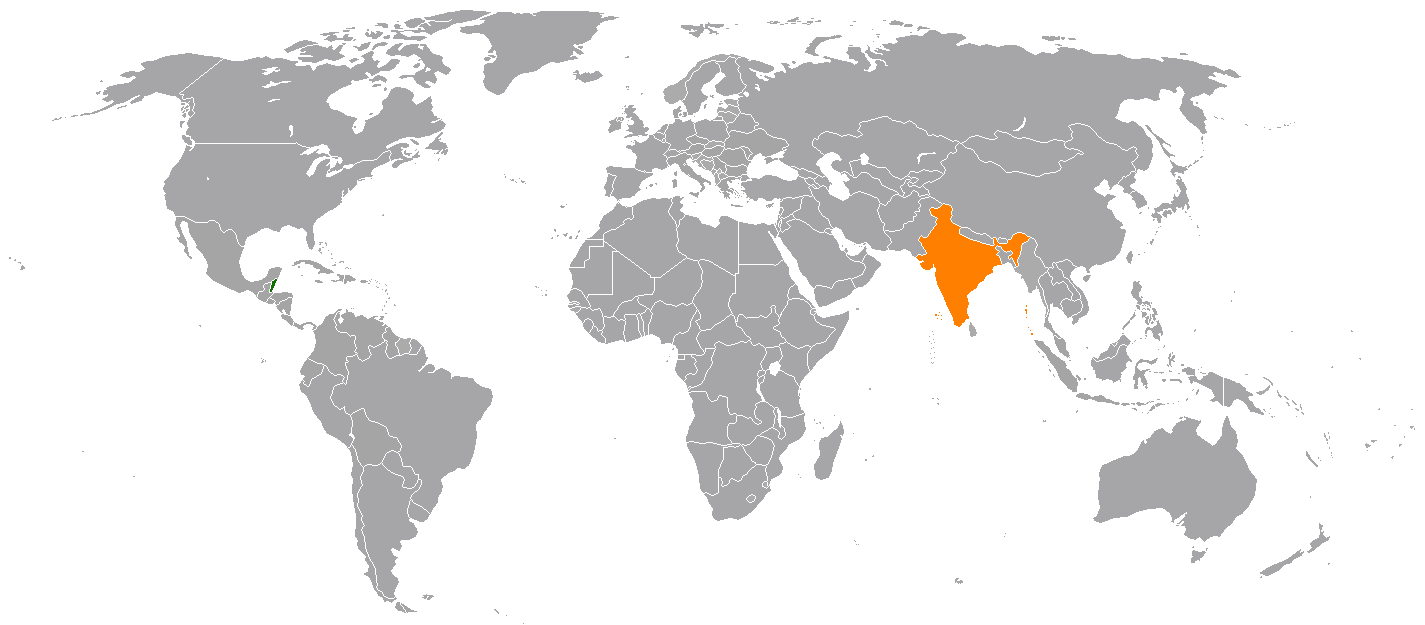

- Belize: India

Belize and India maintain honorary consulates in each other's capital cities.

== Diplomatic relations ==
Belize and India maintain warm diplomatic relations. Belize and India are both member states of the Commonwealth of Nations, and support each other on most issues on international fora. Belize and India also engage in dialogue through the Central American Integration System (SICA) that the former is a member of, on issues such as anti-terrorism, climate change and food security.

Several high-level visits between leaders of Belize and India have taken place.

== Economic relations ==
Bilateral trade between Belize and India totaled US$45.4 million in 2013, up from US$23 million in the previous year. India exported $23 million worth of goods to Belize, and imported $22.4 million worth of commodities in 2013. The main commodities exported from India to Belize are textiles, organic chemicals, pharmaceuticals, and auto parts. The main imports from Belize are miscellaneous chemical products.

On 18 September 2013, Belize and India signed a Tax Information Exchange Agreement in Belmopan.

== Indian foreign aid ==
India has often provided Belize with aid in the aftermath of natural disasters. India also provides Belize with a line of credit of US$30 million, as part of its foreign aid program for SICA countries.

India donated Bajaj 3-wheelers, medicines, cricket equipment, and computers to the India Belize Friendship Computer Centre in St. John's College. In 2013, India sent a senior IPS officer to serve for a one-year period as Adviser to the Commissioner of Police of Belize, based on a request from the Belizean Prime Minister. The Prime Minister has also requested India to open a Vocational Training Centre in Belize City.

Citizens of Belize are eligible for scholarships under the Indian Technical and Economic Cooperation Programme and the Indian Council for Cultural Relations.

== Cultural relations ==
Cultural troupes from the Indian Council for Cultural Relations make visits to Belize.

The Belize Indian Merchants Association (BIMA) based in the Corozal Free Trade Zone, and the Belize Indian Community (BIC) based in Belize City, are two Indian community organisations in Belize. Both organisations have temples in Belize, which also serve as community centres.

== Indians in Belize ==
The Indian community in Belize dates back to the mid-nineteenth century. They migrated from the Caribbean over a period of about 150 years and have been completely assimilated into the local culture. They are referred to in Belize as Asian Indians or East Indians. As of January 2016, over 1,500 Indians reside in Belize, of which 200 are Indian citizens and the rest are persons of Indian origin. Most of the community is engaged in business and are of Sindhi origin.

Asian Indians constitute approximately four per cent of the population of Belize. As of January 2016, there were 7,000-8,000 Asian Indians in Belize.

== Diplomatic missions ==
- Belize has an honorary consulate in New Delhi.
- India is accredited to Belize from its embassy in Mexico City, Mexico and has an honorary consulate in Belize City.
