= Belize Adventist Junior College =

Christian college in Belize

Coordinates: 18.365190°N 88.436134°W

- Other name: BAJC
- Type: University
- Established: 1999
- Dean: Rojer I. Acosta
- Location: Calcutta, Corozal, Belize
- Website: www.bajc.edu.bz

Belize Adventist Junior College is a Christian Junior college in the Calcutta Village of the Corozal District in Belize. The Belize Adventist Junior College provides students with an education in a Christian setting.

It is a part of the Seventh-day Adventist education system, the world's second largest Christian school system.

== Spiritual aspects ==
Students take religion classes each year that they are enrolled. The classes cover topics in biblical history and Christian and denominational doctrines. Instructors in other disciplines also begin each class period with prayer or a short devotional thought, many with student input. Weekly, the entire student body gathers together for an hour-long chapel service. Outside the classrooms there is year-round spiritually oriented programming that relies on student involvement.

== Athletics ==
The Sydney Adventist College offer the following sports:

- Soccer (boys and girls)

== See also ==
- List of Seventh-day Adventist secondary schools
- Seventh-day Adventist education
- Seventh-day Adventist Church
- Seventh-day Adventist theology
- History of the Seventh-day Adventist Church
