= San Narciso, Belize =

San Narciso
- Village
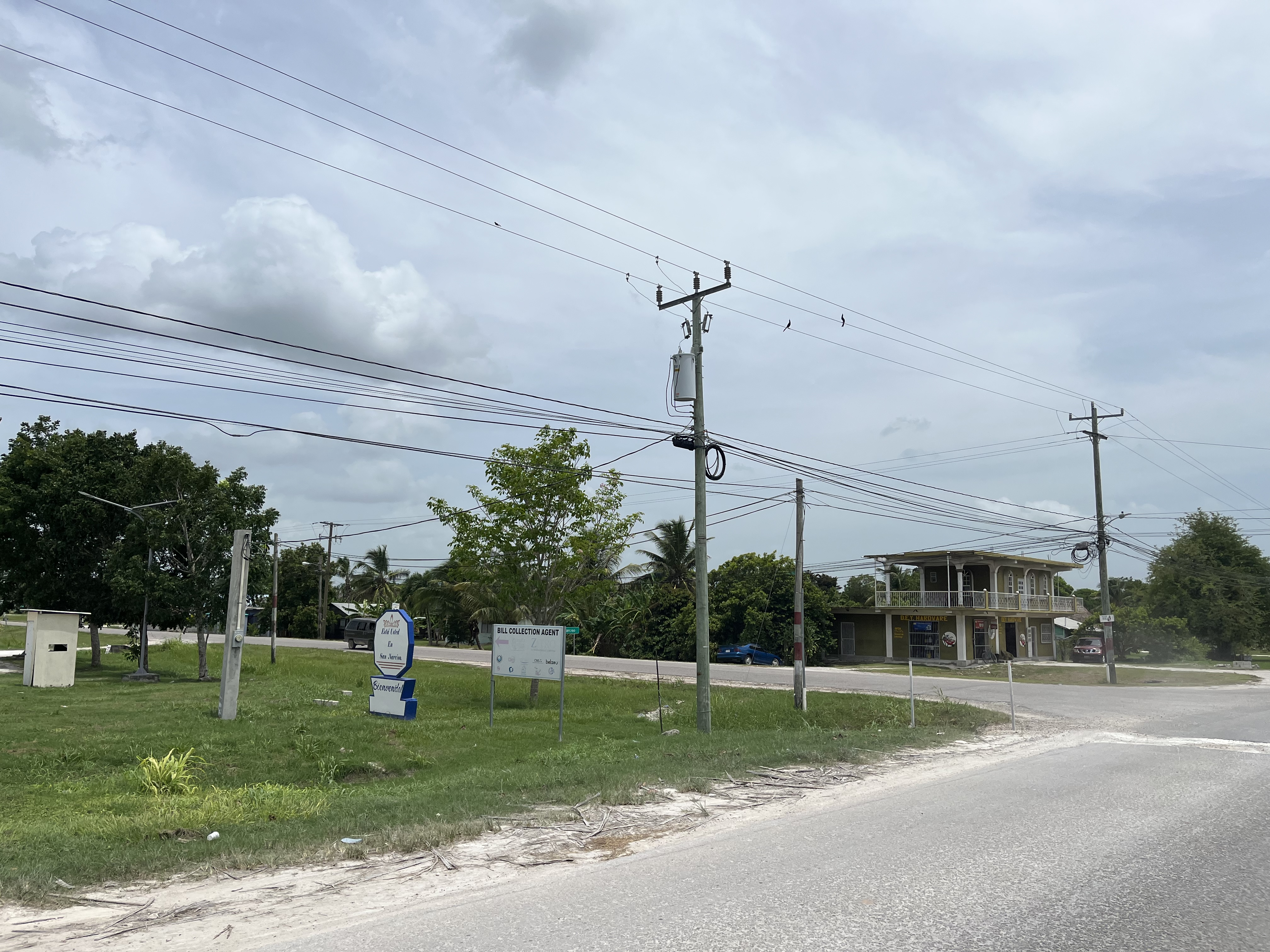

- Location in Belize
- Coordinates: 18°18′20″N 88°31′00″W
- District: Corozal District
- Constituency: Corozal South West

Population (2010)
  - Total: 2,423

San Narciso is a village in Corozal District, Belize. It is part of the Corozal South West constituency.

== Demographics ==
At the time of the 2010 census, San Narciso had a population of 2,423. Of these, 99.1% were Mestizo, 0.3% Mennonite, 0.2% Mixed, 0.2% Ketchi Maya and 0.1% Creole.

In terms of languages spoken (multiple answers allowed), 99.2% spoke Spanish, 24.3% English, 2.6% Yucatec Maya, 0.2% Creole and 0.1% Mopan Maya; 0.4% could not speak.
