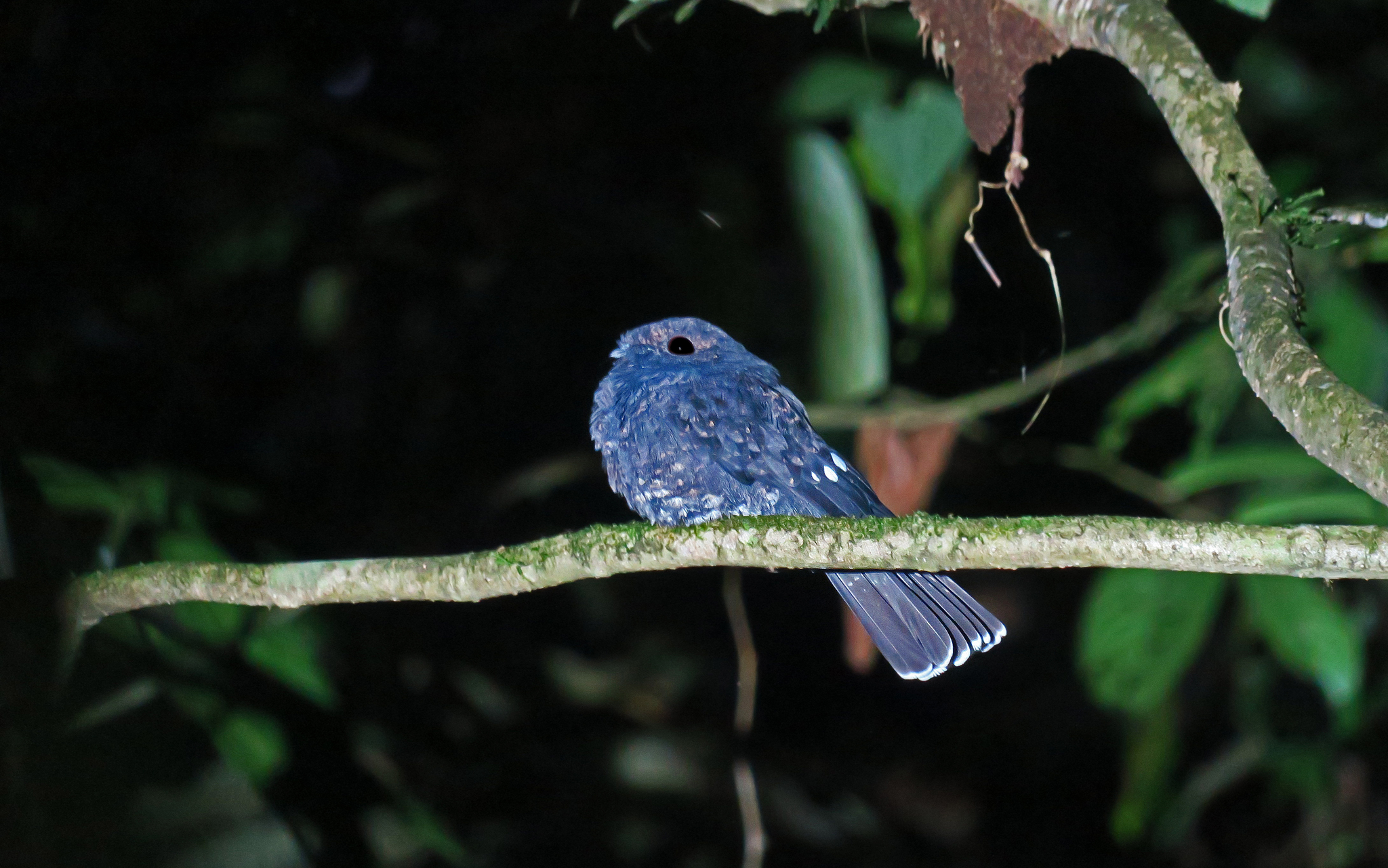

Conservation status
- Least Concern (IUCN 3.1)

Scientific classification
- Kingdom: Animalia
- Phylum: Chordata
- Class: Aves
- Order: Caprimulgiformes
- Family: Caprimulgidae
- Genus: Nyctiphrynus
- Species: N. rosenbergi

Binomial name
- Nyctiphrynus rosenbergi (Hartert, 1895)

Synonyms
- Caprimulgus rosenbergi; Nyctiphrynus ocellatus rosenbergi

= Chocó poorwill =

Species of bird

The Chocó poorwill (Nyctiphrynus rosenbergi) is a species of nightjar in the family Caprimulgidae. It is found in Colombia and Ecuador.

== Taxonomy and systematics ==
The Chocó poorwill was originally described as Caprimulgus rosenbergi, in a genus that was later split into multiple genera. For a time it was treated as a subspecies of ocellated poorwill (Nyctiphrynus ocellatus) but plumage, vocalization, and genetic differences show it to be its own species. It is monotypic.

== Description ==
The Chocó poorwill is 19.5 to 22.5 cm (7.7 to 8.9 in) long; one female weighed 52 g (1.8 oz). Adults are generally variations on dark brown. The head is grayish with many black spots, the back grayish with cinnamon and rufous speckles, and the rump browner with grayish white speckles. The wings are brown to dark brown with tawny, cinnamon, and rufous spots and speckles and two prominent white spots. The chin is dark brown with cinnamon speckles and the throat has a large white patch. The breast is brown with cinnamon barring and speckles, the belly and flanks blackish brown with dense narrow grayish white bars. Juveniles are similar to adults but lack the two white spots on the wing and their back and breast markings are more chestnut.

== Distribution and habitat ==
The Chocó poorwill is found on the Pacific slope from the northern part of Colombia's Chocó Department south into Ecuador's Esmeraldas Province and perhaps further south as well. It inhabits the Pacific/Chocó natural region, a biome characterized by very humid evergreen forest. It appears to favor edges such as along rivers and in treefall openings. In elevation it ranges from sea level to 900 m (3,000 ft).

== Behavior ==
=== Feeding ===
The Chocó poorwill is crepuscular and nocturnal. It has been observed foraging by sallies from the ground or a perch and also in continuous flight above the canopy. Its diet is insects but the details have not been studied.

=== Breeding ===
Virtually nothing is known about the Chocó poorwill's breeding phenology. It is assumed to lay one or two eggs directly on the ground like other members of family Caprimulgidae. Its breeding season is believed to span from March to June.

=== Vocalization ===
The Chocó poorwill's song is "a resonant, whistled rhythmic kwor kwor kwor kweeér". It also makes "frog-like notes such as kwok or kwi-kwok, and a klaw".

== Status ==
The IUCN has assessed the Chocó poorwill as least concern. Its population size is unknown but is believed to be decreasing due to accelerating deforestation for settlement, conversion to oil palm plantations, and other uses.
