= Progreso, Belize =

Progreso
- Location within Belize
- Coordinates: 18°13′N 88°24′W
- Country: Belize
- District: Corozal District
- Constituency: Corozal South East

Population (2010)
  - Total: 1,356
- Time zone: UTC-6 (Central)
- Climate: Aw

Progreso is a village in the Corozal District of the nation of Belize.

== Demographics ==
At the time of the 2010 census, Progreso had a population of 1,356. Of these, 87.8% were Mestizo, 4.9% Creole, 1.7% Mixed, 1.6% Mennonite, 1.3% East Indian, 0.8% Caucasian, 0.7% Yucatec Maya, 0.6% Ketchi Maya, 0.2% African, 0.1% Asian, 0.1% Garifuna, 0.1% Mopan Maya and 0.2% others.

In terms of languages spoken (multiple answers allowed), 97.3% spoke Spanish, 34.9% English, 3.2% Creole, 0.5% Yucatec Maya, 0.2% German and 0.1% Garifuna; 0.2% could not speak.
