= Sarteneja =

- Village
- Village of Sarteneja
- Flag

- Location within Belize
- Coordinates: 18°21′12″N 88°8′46″W
- Country: Belize
- District: Corozal District
- Constituency: Corozal South East
- Established: 1847

Government
  - Chairman: Paulino Lucio Guerrero (PUP)

Area
  - Total: 90.33 km^{2} (34.88 sq mi)
- Elevation: 2–4 m (6.6–13.1 ft)

Population (2016)
  - Total: 3,550
- Demonym: Sartenejeño(a)
- Time zone: UTC-6 (Central)
- Climate: Aw

Sarteneja is the largest fishing community and the second largest village in Belize. It recorded a population of 3,500 according to a 2016 estimate. The name Sarteneja is a Castilian distortion of its original Mayan name Tza-ten-a-ha, which means 'water between the rocks'.

Sarteneja is on the Sarteneja Peninsula, approximately forty miles by road from Orange Walk Town and is near the privately owned Shipstern Conservation & Management Area. The village's economy is based primarily on fishing for lobster, conch, and finfish. There are many farmers, particularly retired fishermen who farm. Tourism is becoming increasingly significant as a source of income or at least as another alternative livelihood for those who no longer fish.

== History ==
The village name comes from the Yucatec Maya word "Tzaten-a-ha" or "Tza-ten-a-ha," meaning "water between the rocks" or "give me the water," derived from 13 ancient wells carved into limestone bedrock. The area flourished as a prosperous Maya seaport and trading center during the Classic and Post-classic periods.

The modern village was officially established in 1847 (or the mid-1850s) by Mestizo refugees fleeing the Caste War of Yucatán in neighboring Mexico.

Hurricane Janet passed directly over northern Belize as a Category 5 storm in 1955. The southern edge struck Sarteneja, submerging the village under 8 to 10 feet of water from severe storm surges. Though the community was flattened and left homeless, the village was rebuilt. It evolved into Belize's premier fishing hub, and stands as one of the very last places in the Caribbean where wooden fishing vessels and sailboats are still entirely designed and crafted by hand.

In 1990, Sarteneja received first telephone service connection. This marked the shift away from old community-managed networks to an expanded national infrastructure to modern internet access to the village.

== Demographics ==
At the time of the 2010 census, Sarteneja had a population of 1,824. Of these, 91.1% were Mestizo, 3.6% Mixed, 2.6% Creole, 1.3% Caucasian, 0.3% Mopan Maya, 0.3% Asian, 0.2% Ketchi Maya, 0.2% Garifuna, 0.2% Yucatec Maya, 0.1% East Indian, 0.1% Lebanese, 0.1% African and 0.1% Mennonite.

In terms of languages spoken (multiple answers allowed), 97.6% spoke Spanish, 49.6% English, 5.4% Creole, 0.4% Mandarin or Cantonese, 0.4% Mopan Maya, 0.2% Garifuna, 0.2% German, 0.2% Yucatec Maya, 0.1% Ketchi Maya, 0.1% Hindi and 0.4% other languages; 0.2% could not speak.

== Boatbuilding ==
Sarteneja is home to shipwrights who are still active, having built most of the traditional fishing boat fleet (visible in Haulover Creek in Belize city) and many of the tourist sailing boats, most notably: Sirena Azul (San Pedro), Ragga King, Ragga Gial, Blackhawk (Caye Caulker), Brujula (Hopkins), and Zayann. One of the best known boat builders of Sarteneja is Evaristo Verde (Barich). Verde built more than 17 boats during his lifetime.

== The Sarteneja Easter Regatta ==
Sarteneja is known for its Easter Regatta, which takes place every year on Easter Sunday when most of the village's fleet has returned during the fishing season break.

== Gallery ==
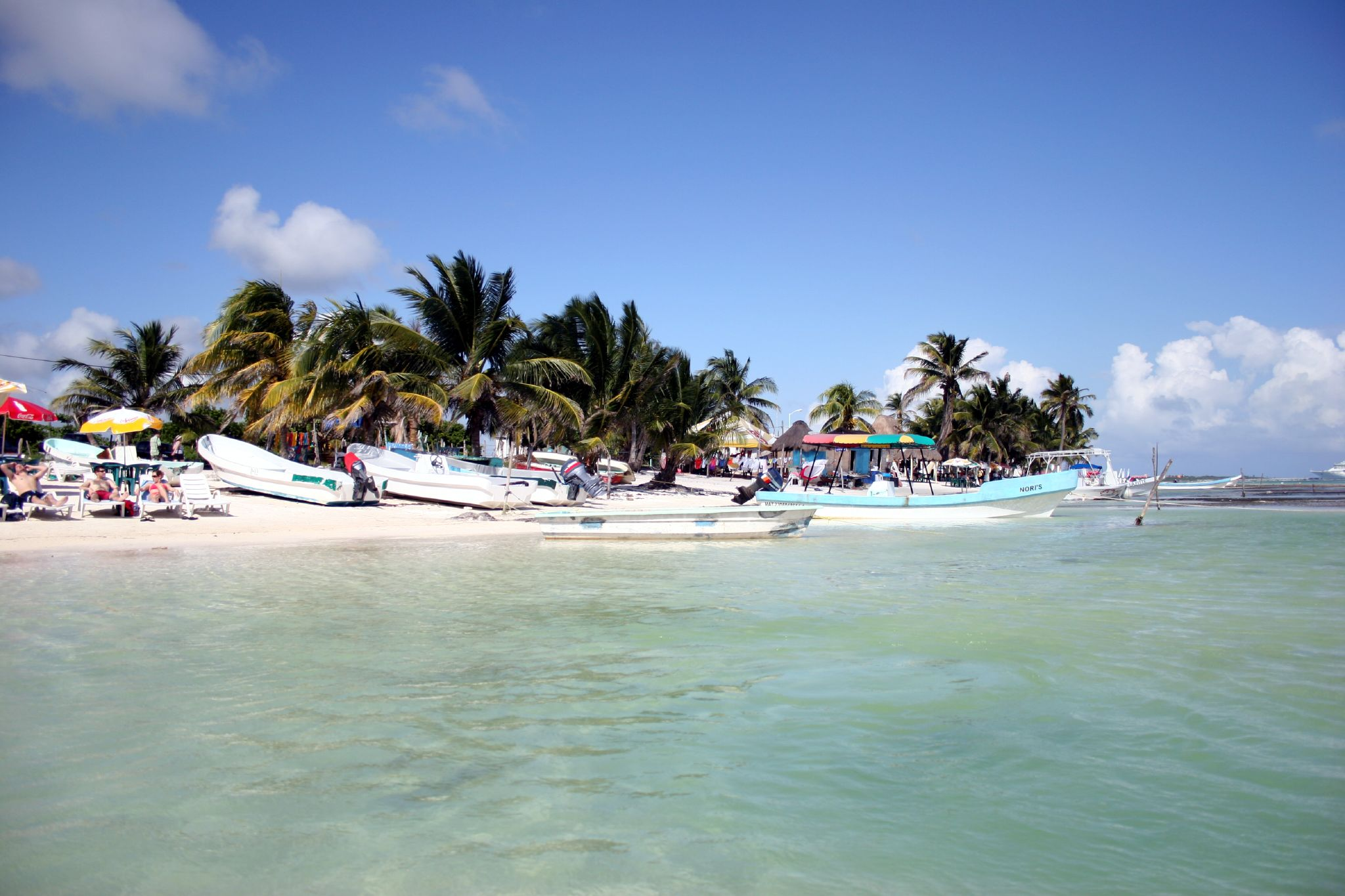

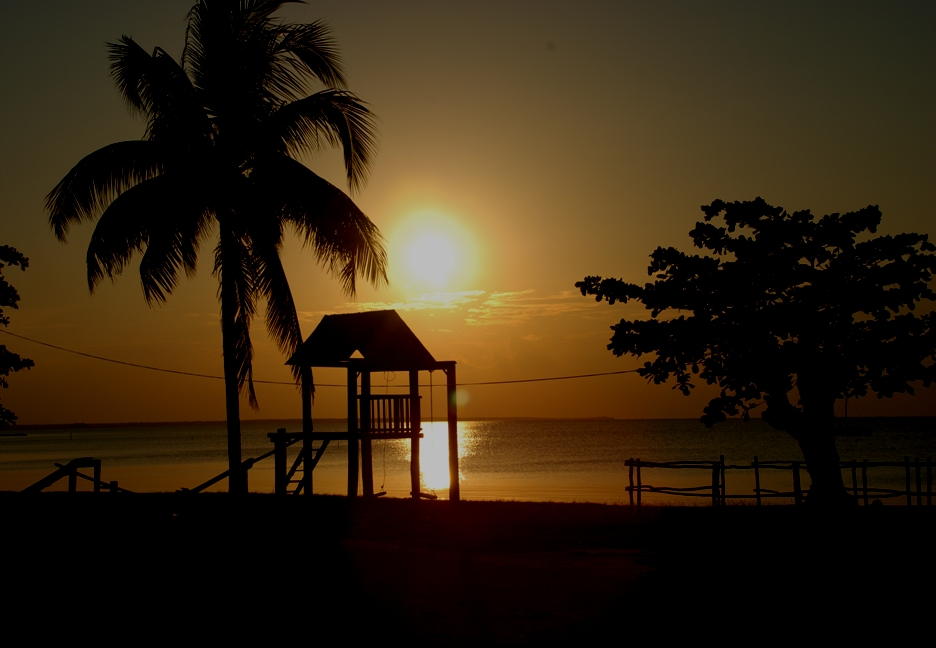
Sarteneja North Front at sunset
