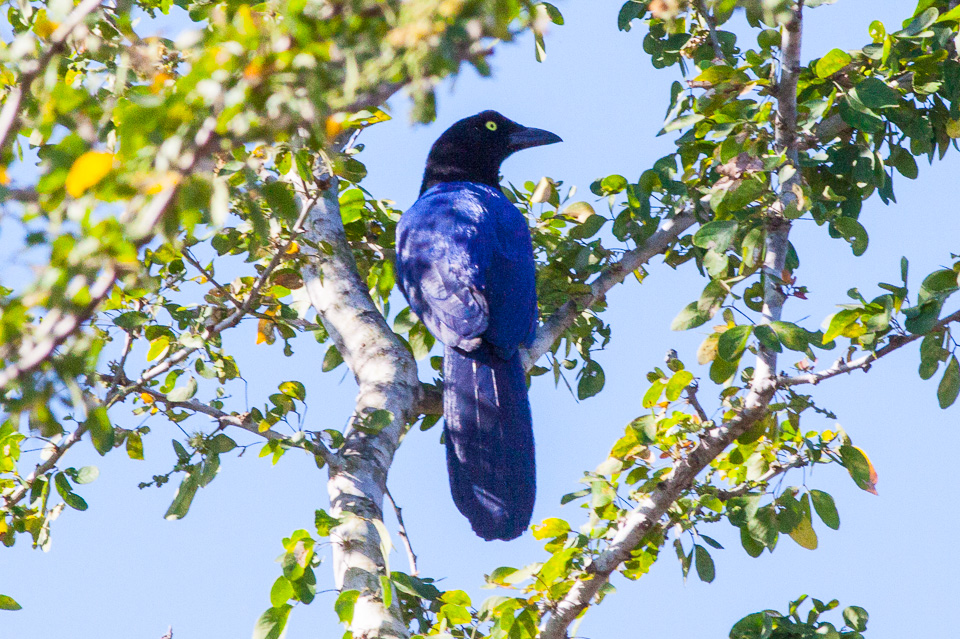
- In Sinaloa, Mexico

Conservation status
- Least Concern (IUCN 3.1)

Scientific classification
- Kingdom: Animalia
- Phylum: Chordata
- Class: Aves
- Order: Passeriformes
- Family: Corvidae
- Genus: Cyanocorax
- Species: C. beecheii

Binomial name
- Cyanocorax beecheii (Vigors, 1829)

= Purplish-backed jay =

Species of bird

The purplish-backed jay (Cyanocorax beecheii) is a bird of the crow family Corvidae, with purple feathers on its back, wings, and tail and black feathers elsewhere. It is endemic to northwestern Mexico, where its habitat is mainly dry deciduous forest. The International Union for Conservation of Nature has assessed it as being a "species of least concern".

== Description ==
The purplish-backed jay is a purple and black bird with a powerful bill and a long tail. It varies in length between 35 and 41 cm (14 and 16 in), with males usually larger than females. The head, neck, upper mantle, and underparts are black, and there is a small ruffled erectile crest on the forehead. The underside of the wings and the tail are also blackish, while the remainder of the plumage is purplish-blue, being brightest on the lower part of the mantle and the rump. The bill is black, and the irises and legs are yellow.

== Ecology ==
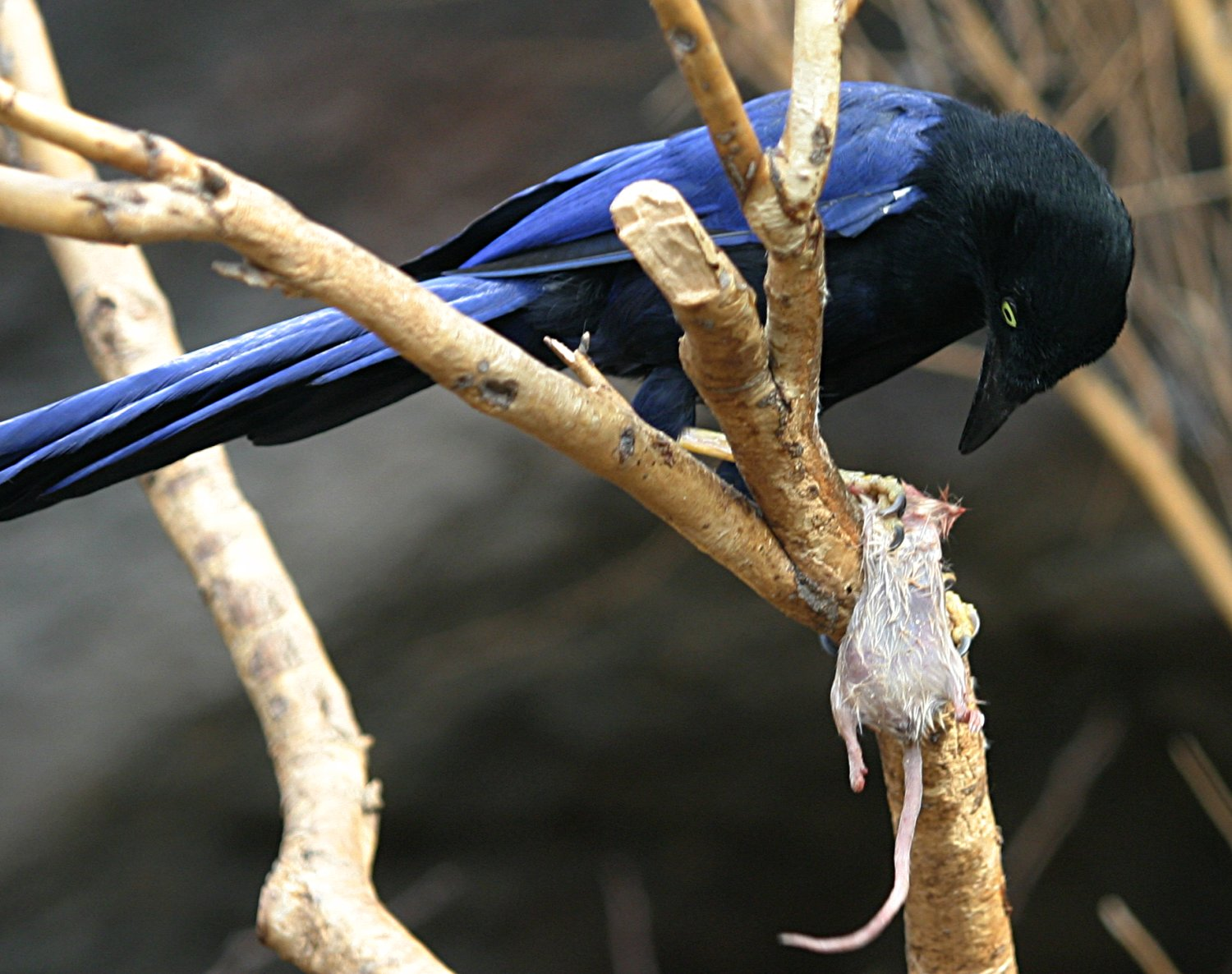
Purplish-backed jay feeding at the Henry Doorly Zoo

This jay forms small social groups consisting of an adult pair and up to three young from the previous year. They move through the forest using varying strategies to acquire the invertebrates and small vertebrates on which they feed; some insects are caught in midair, others are plucked off leaves, grubs are obtained by probing bark and other prey are obtained by foraging through the plant litter. The birds are omnivorous and sometimes leave the forest to visit and feed in orchards, fields of grain, rubbish dumps, and road verges.

The groups are territorial, establishing home ranges of 25 to 43 hectares (62 to 106 acres) and defending these from neighbouring groups. They also mob and drive off predators. The birds pair for life, with pair bonding behaviours including various vocal displays as well as mutual preening and the passing of food from one partner to the other. Although the group may contain more than one pair, only the dominant pair will normally nest in any given year. The female is assisted in building the nest by other members of the group. It is an untidy platform of twigs, and a clutch of about five eggs is laid in early May. The female incubates the eggs for about nineteen days, being fed by the male and sometimes other members of the group. The newly hatched chicks are fed by both parents and by other members of the group and fledge in about 24 days; juvenile males remain with the group for a year or so before dispersing, while females may remain indefinitely with the group.

== Status ==
The total population of the purplish-backed jay is thought to be declining in line with the degradation of the dry deciduous forest where it lives. However, the decline is gradual and has a wide range, so the International Union for Conservation of Nature has assessed its conservation status as being of "least concern".
