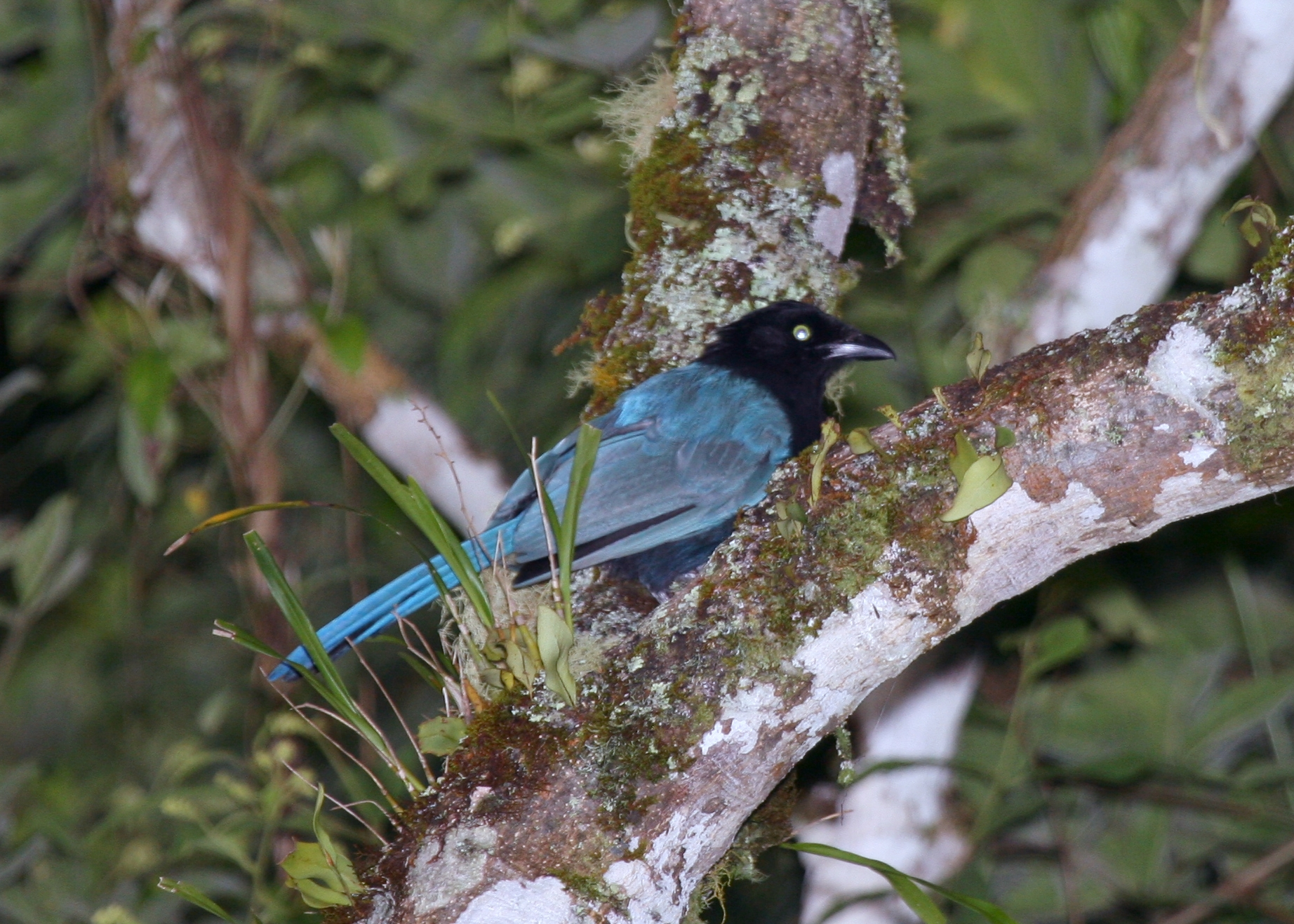

Conservation status
- Least Concern (IUCN 3.1)

Scientific classification
- Kingdom: Animalia
- Phylum: Chordata
- Class: Aves
- Order: Passeriformes
- Family: Corvidae
- Genus: Cyanocorax
- Species: C. melanocyaneus

Binomial name
- Cyanocorax melanocyaneus (Hartlaub, 1844)

Synonyms
- Xanthura melanocyanea

= Bushy-crested jay =

Species of bird

The bushy-crested jay (Cyanocorax melanocyaneus) is a species of bird in the family Corvidae. It is found in Central America, where its natural habitats are subtropical or tropical moist montane forests and heavily degraded former forest. There are two subspecies, C. m. melanocyaneus which is found in Guatemala and southern El Salvador, and C. m. chavezi from Honduras and northeastern Nicaragua.

== Description ==
The adult bushy-crested jay has a length of 28 to 30 cm (11 to 12 in). The tail is long and the central feathers are graduated. The sexes look alike; the head, neck, breast and upper mantle are black while the remaining upper parts are dark blue with a sheen of green or violet. The underparts are plain greenish-blue, the undersides of the wings are grey and the underside of the tail is blackish. The head bears a stubble-like erectile crown of feathers, the beak is black and relatively small, the irises are yellow and the legs black.

== Distribution and habitat ==
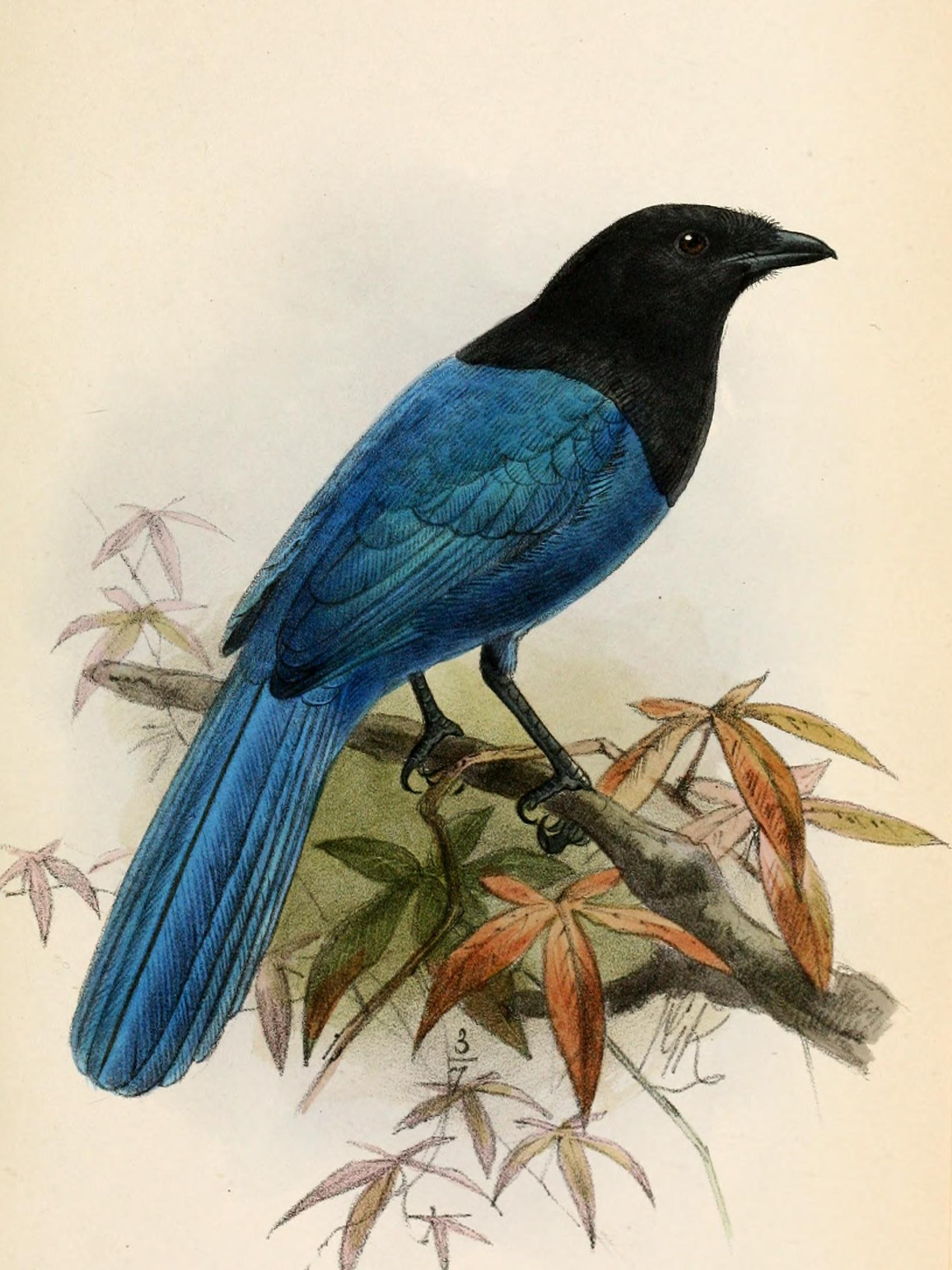
Illustration by Keulemans, 1877

This jay is native to Central America where it is found in Guatemala, El Salvador, Honduras and Nicaragua at altitudes between about 600 and 2,450 m (2,000 and 8,000 ft). Its habitat is humid forests, especially those with pine and oak, forest verges, glades and areas of scrub. It adapts well to degradation of its habitat and has become common in coffee plantations and around agricultural land.

== Ecology ==
The species is social and lives in small groups. These forage in the lower storey of trees and in the undergrowth, often descending to the ground to search through the leaf litter. The diet consists of invertebrates, seeds, nuts and fruits. The nest is built in dense undergrowth out of twigs and lined with plant fibres. One female lays a clutch of three or four eggs in late April or early May. Another female shares the incubation of the eggs with her, and many birds assist with the feeding of the young. In one nest, eleven different adults helped feed the brood, as well as some juveniles that had hatched earlier.

== Status ==
Cyanocorax melanocyaneus seems to be adaptable and is coping with the degradation of its natural environment by moving to manmade habitats such as coffee plantations and cropland. It has a wide range and the population is thought to be increasing, so the International Union for Conservation of Nature has rated it as a species of least concern.
