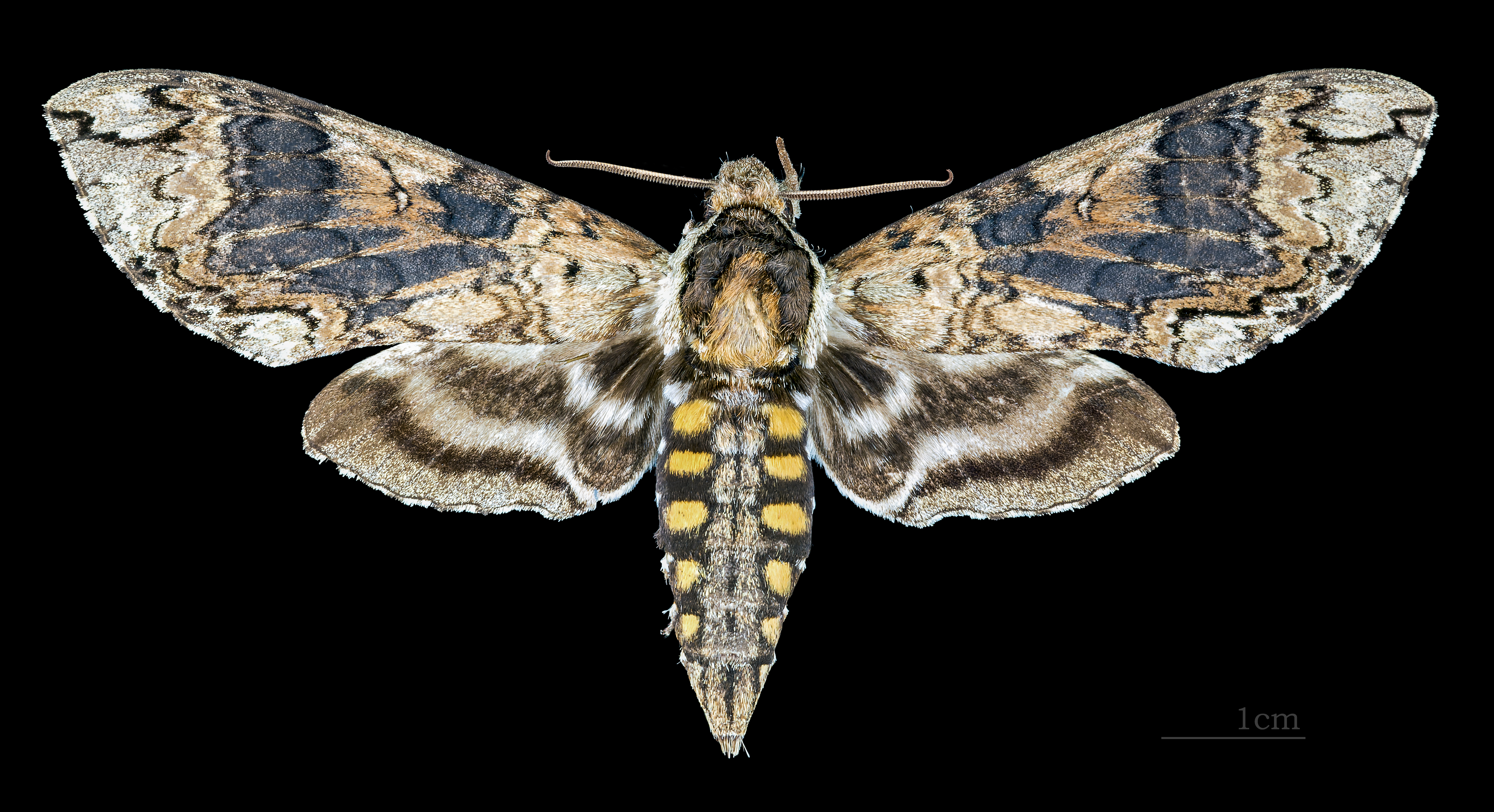
- Manduca wellingi, dorsal
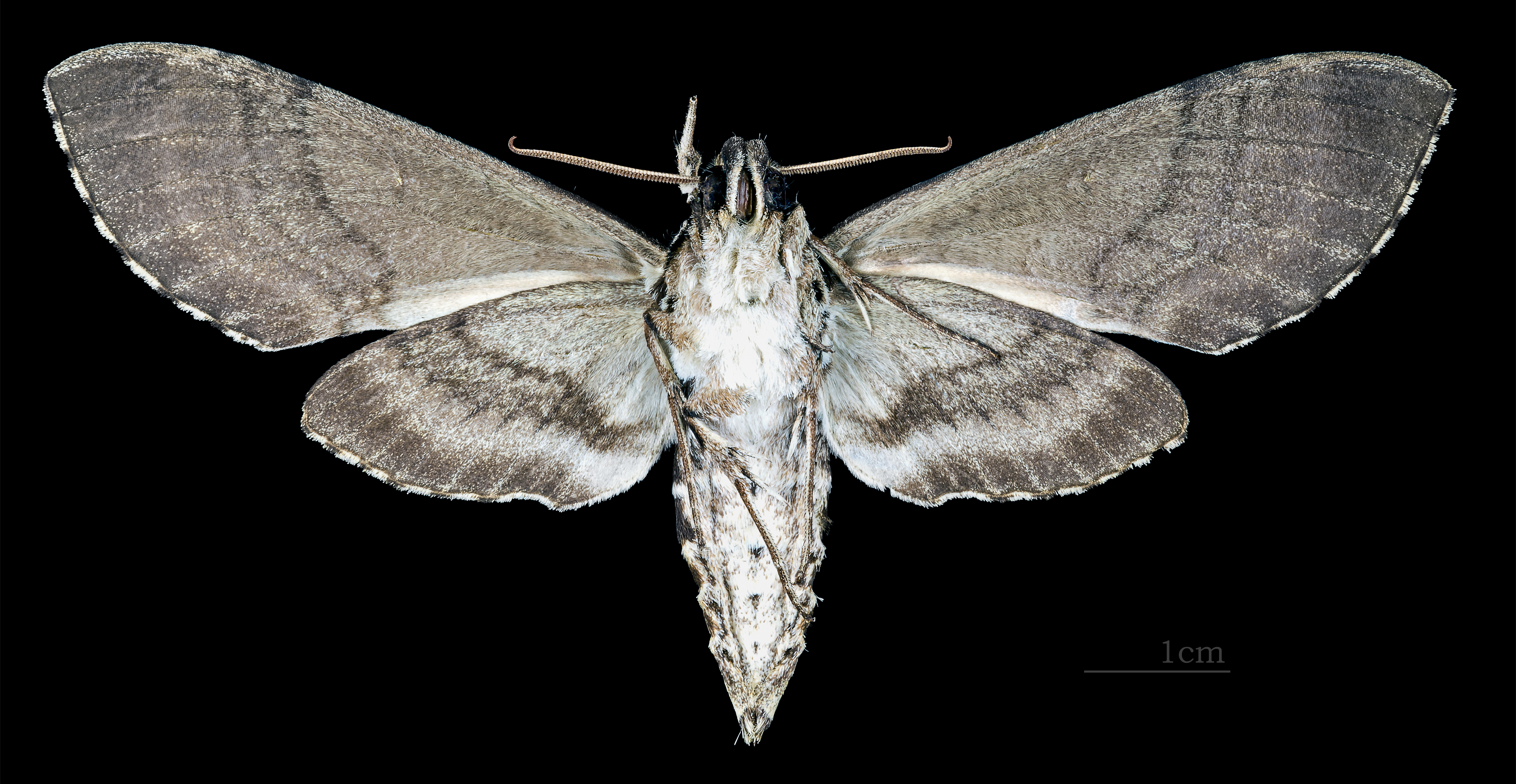
- Manduca wellingi, ventral

Scientific classification
- Kingdom: Animalia
- Phylum: Arthropoda
- Class: Insecta
- Order: Lepidoptera
- Family: Sphingidae
- Genus: Manduca
- Species: M. wellingi

Binomial name
- Manduca wellingi Brou, 1984

= Manduca wellingi =

Species of moth

Manduca wellingi is a moth of the family Sphingidae. It is found from Mexico to Belize.

It is similar to Manduca pellenia, but is smaller.
