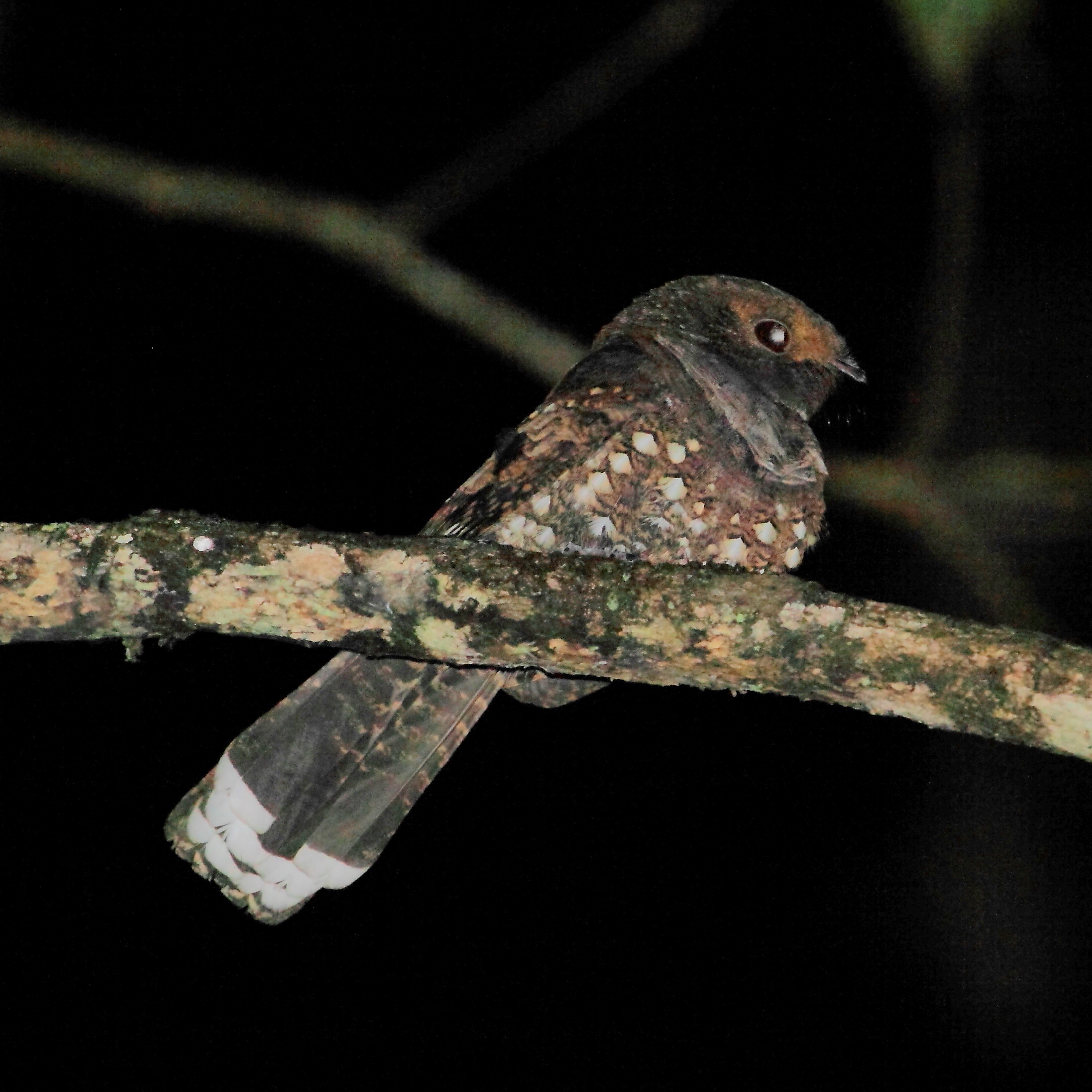
- at Tremembé, São Paulo State, Brazil

Conservation status
- Least Concern (IUCN 3.1)

Scientific classification
- Kingdom: Animalia
- Phylum: Chordata
- Class: Aves
- Order: Caprimulgiformes
- Family: Caprimulgidae
- Genus: Nyctiphrynus
- Species: N. ocellatus

Binomial name
- Nyctiphrynus ocellatus (Tschudi, 1844)

= Ocellated poorwill =

Species of bird

The ocellated poorwill (Nyctiphrynus ocellatus) is a species of nightjar in the family Caprimulgidae. It is found in Argentina, Bolivia, Brazil, Colombia, Costa Rica, Ecuador, Honduras, Nicaragua, Paraguay, and Peru.

== Taxonomy and systematics ==
At one time what is now the Choco poorwill (Nyctiphrynus rosenbergi) was considered a subspecies of the ocellated poorwill, but plumage, vocalization, and genetic differences showed it to be its own species. The ocellated poorwill now has two recognized subspecies, the nominate N. o. ocellatus and N. o. lautus. A proposed subspecies N. o. bergeni is included in the nominate.

== Description ==
The ocellated poorwill is 20 to 21 cm (7.9 to 8.3 in) long. Males weigh 35 to 43 g (1.2 to 1.5 oz) and females 29 to 44 g (1.0 to 1.6 oz). There are two color morphs, one brown and one rufous. The brown morph of the nominate is mostly dark grayish brown with blackish brown spots on the wings and white spots on the belly. The white spots somewhat resemble eyes, which gives the bird its name. It has a bold white band around the throat. The outer three or four tail feathers have narrow white tips. The rufous morph is paler and reddish brown instead of dark brown. N. o. lautus is smaller and the white tips on the tail are narrower. At least one author contends that its holotype is immature and that otherwise there are no color differences between the subspecies.

== Distribution and habitat ==
The ocellated poorwill has a disjunct distribution. The nominate is found in two parts of South America. One extends from southern Colombia through eastern Ecuador and Peru into Bolivia and east into Amazonian Brazil. The other is from southeastern Brazil west into eastern Paraguay and extreme northeastern Argentina. N. o. lautus is found in the border area of eastern Honduras and northeastern Nicaragua and in northwestern Costa Rica. There is one unconfirmed sight record in Panama. The species mostly inhabits lowland forest having an open understory and small clearings. It is also found in dense secondary forest. In elevation it has been reported from sea level to 1,350 m (4,400 ft).

== Behavior ==
=== Feeding ===
The ocellated poorwill is nocturnal. It forages by sallying from low perches. Its diet is insects of many kinds.

=== Breeding ===
The ocellated poorwill's breeding seasons have not been defined though they are known to differ across its range. The clutch of two eggs is laid directly on the ground or on leaf litter without a nest, usually below some kind of cover. Both sexes incubate the eggs.

=== Vocalization ===
The male ocellated poorwill's song is "a repetitive trilled 'preeeo' or 'prEEoo'". The call is "a soft, guttural 'wah, wah, wah'."

== Status ==
The IUCN has assessed the ocellated poorwill as being of Least Concern. It has a large range and very large population that is however believed to be decreasing. The only potential threat known is deforestation, especially in the Central American enclaves.
