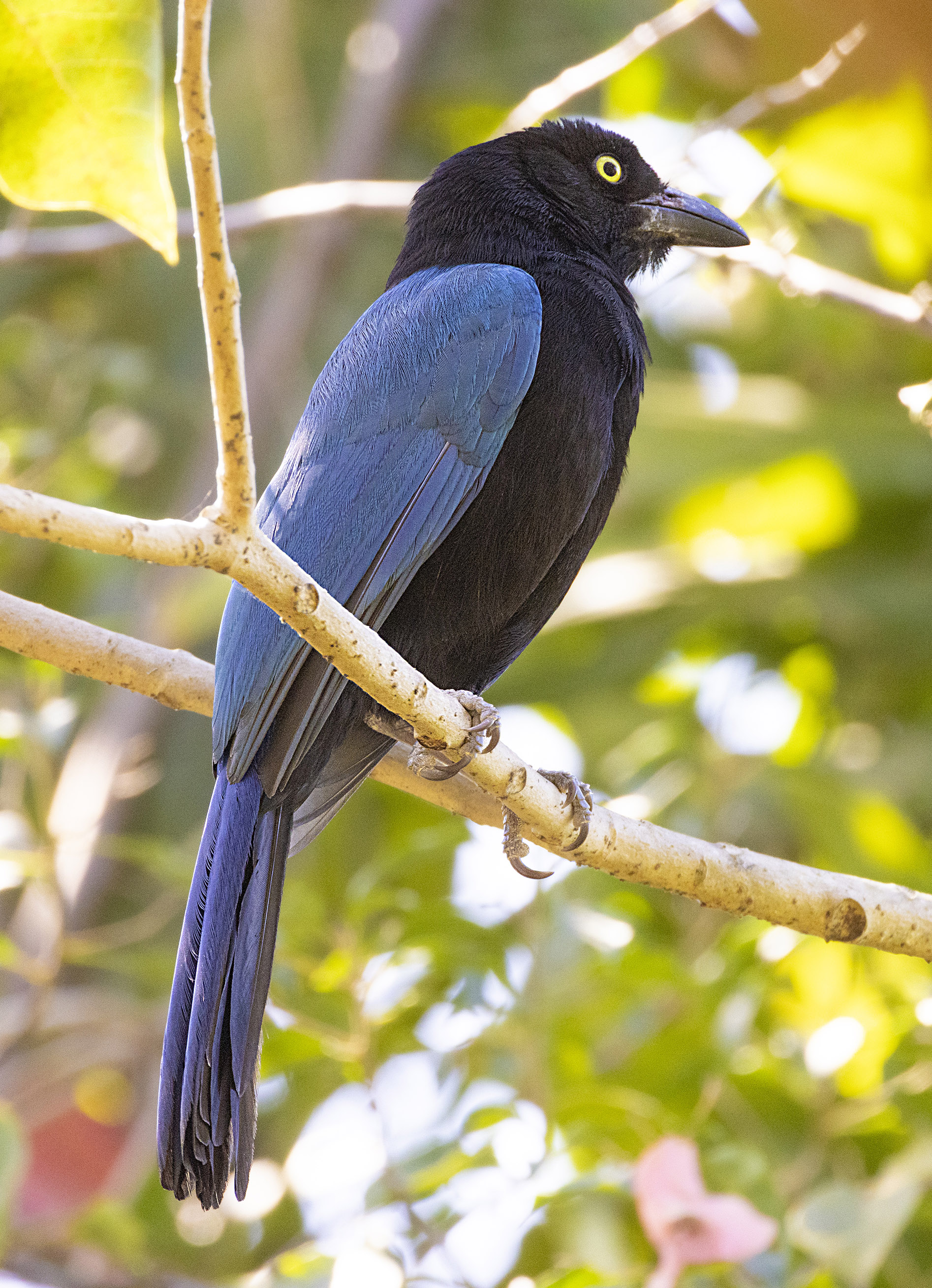
- Puerto Vallarta Botanical Gardens

Conservation status
- Least Concern (IUCN 3.1)

Scientific classification
- Kingdom: Animalia
- Phylum: Chordata
- Class: Aves
- Order: Passeriformes
- Family: Corvidae
- Genus: Cyanocorax
- Species: C. sanblasianus

Binomial name
- Cyanocorax sanblasianus (Lafresnaye, 1842)

= San Blas jay =

Species of bird

The San Blas jay (Cyanocorax sanblasianus) is a species of bird in the family Corvidae. It is endemic to Mexico where its natural habitat is subtropical or tropical dry forests; it is a common species and has been rated as "least concern" by the IUCN.

== Description ==
The adult San Blas jay is between 27 and 35 cm (11 and 14 in) long and weighs between 92 and 122 g (3 and 4 oz). The sexes are similar; the adult has back, rump, wings and tail blue and the remaining plumage black. There is a small crest on the front of the head, the bill is black, the irises are white and the legs are black. The juveniles are similar apart from a larger crest, a yellow bill and brown eyes.

== Distribution ==
This jay is endemic to Mexico. There are two subspecies; C. s. nelsoni is found in southwestern Mexico, from Nayarit, Jalisco and Colima southward to western Guerrero; and C. s. sanblasianus is found in the coastal region of Guerrero. The habitat includes dry and semi-moist woodland, thickets, groves and plantations as well as mangrove areas. This bird is not found deep in the forest.

== Ecology ==
The species is social, living in small groups of up to thirty individuals including six to ten breeding pairs. These occupy a large territory but have little interaction with neighbouring groups. The birds seem to have stable pair bonds and most start breeding at three years old. The nests are grouped socially in trees, vines or shrubs, often in the crowns of palm trees. Each is constructed of twigs and lined with soft plant material, and a clutch of up to four mottled eggs is laid. Non-breeding females sometimes take short turns at incubation, which takes about eighteen days. Both parents care for the young, and several birds may help feed the chicks, especially after they have fledged.

The San Blas jay is omnivorous, the birds feeding both on the ground and in the lower parts of trees. The diet consists of insects and other invertebrates, fruit and small vertebrates such as lizards. This bird has been observed taking nestlings from the nest of a ruddy ground dove (Columbina talpacoti).
