= Estevan Perera =

Belizean politician and attorney (born 1982)

Estevan Perera (born April 21, 1982) is a Belizean attorney who has served in the capacity of director for several private and government boards across the country. As the managing partner at the law firm of Estevan Perera & Company LLP, he specializes in private acquisitions, corporate law, intellectual property, and civil litigation.

== Education ==
Estevan Perera holds a Certificate of Legal Education from the Hugh Wooding Law School in Trinidad & Tobago (2007-2009). He also holds a Bachelor of Law (LLB) Degree from the University of the West Indies in Mona, Jamaica (2004-2007) and a Bachelor’s Degree in Criminology from St. Mary's University in Halifax, Nova Scotia, Canada (2001-2004).

== Career ==
Perera is the Managing Partner of the law firm of Estevan Perera & Company LLP located in the Alpha Business Centre at No. 2118 Guava Street, Belize City, Belize. Perera was called to the bar of Belize in 2009.

In 2017, Perera captured a notable victory in the Supreme Court in the case of Janine Vega vs. Laura Blanco & Others (Claim No. 171 of 2017), which ultimately paved the way for the amendment to the Money Lenders Act of Belize in the following year. The said judgment ultimately protects persons against usury interest rates and prevents pawnshops from illegally taking their customer’s property in exchange for debts owed.

== Notable appointments ==
- Honorary Consul of the Republic of Estonia in Belize
- Former Chairman of the Elections and Boundaries Commission of Belize
- Appointed Temporary Senator in Belize on May 11, 2012

== Artistic contribution ==
Perera is the designer and creator of the first Belize Sign Monument which was constructed in September 2014 with a vision of encouraging patriotism among Belizeans. The sign was soon after inaugurated by the Belize City Council in 2015. The vibrant colors of the sign portray the diverse cultures that co-exist within Belize.

A second Belize Sign Monument was later constructed and installed in Belize City. The Belize Sign Monuments are now listed on Trip Advisor as one of the top 10 tourist attractions worth visiting in Belize City.

== Philanthropy ==
He currently serves as an active member of the Rotary Club of Belize Sunrise and as a Director for the Inspiration Center of Belize.

== Personal life ==
Perera is married to Shelley Perera (nee Estephan) and they share two children.
