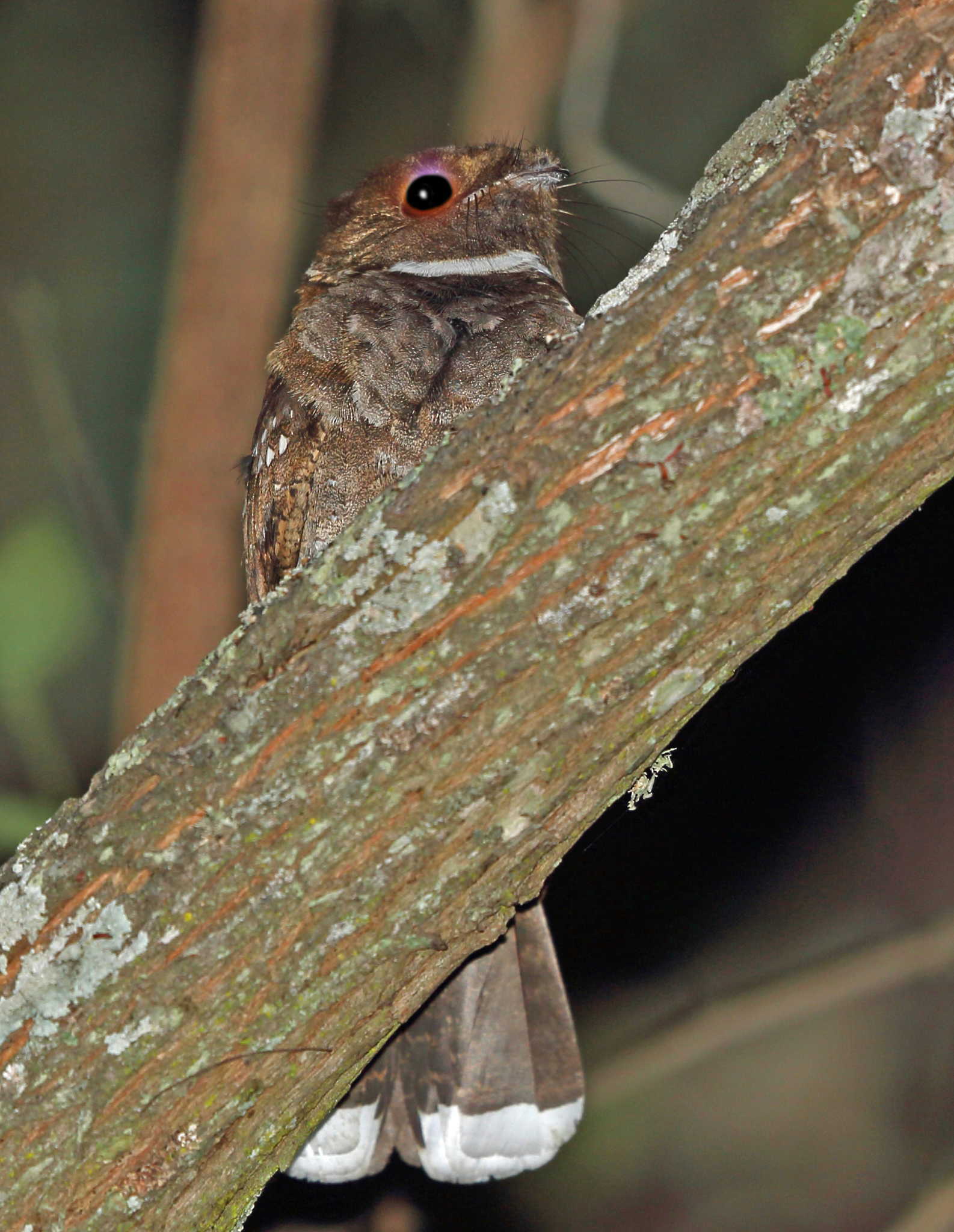

Conservation status
- Least Concern (IUCN 3.1)

Scientific classification
- Kingdom: Animalia
- Phylum: Chordata
- Class: Aves
- Clade: Strisores
- Order: Caprimulgiformes
- Family: Caprimulgidae
- Genus: Nyctiphrynus
- Species: N. mcleodii

Binomial name
- Nyctiphrynus mcleodii (Brewster, 1888)

= Eared poorwill =

Species of bird

The eared poorwill (Nyctiphrynus mcleodii) is a species of nightjar in the family Caprimulgidae. It is endemic to Mexico.

== Taxonomy and systematics ==
The eared poorwill has sometimes been placed in genus Otophanes. Two subspecies, the nominate Nyctiphrynus mcleodii mcleodii and N. m. rayi are recognized by most authorities. However, some authors contend that the latter is invalid.

== Description ==
The eared poorwill is 20 to 21 cm (7.9 to 8.3 in) long. Males weigh 30.8 to 37 g (1.1 to 1.3 oz) and females 24 to 35.3 g (0.85 to 1.2 oz). The nominate subspecies' upperparts are grayish with black and white spots on the wings. A white band that is wider on the throat encircles the neck. They have crown feathers that project as "ear tufts". The breast is grayish and the belly buff with white spots. The tail feathers except the central pair have white tips. There is also a rufous morph that has an overall cinnamon to reddish brown color. N. m. rayi has darker and grayer underparts and the white spots on the wings are smaller.

== Distribution and habitat ==
The eared poorwill is found for most of the length of western Mexico. N. m. mcleodii is found from Chihuahua and Sonora south to Jalisco and Colima. N. m. rayi is found in Guerrero and Oaxaca. (All of the records in the last state are between February and May, indicating some seasonal movement.) They mainly inhabit open pine/oak or oak woodland in semi-arid mountainous terrain. They can also be found in wooded gulleys, hillsides below cloudforest, and overgrown fields. In elevation the species ranges mostly from 600 to 2,000 m (2,000 to 6,600 ft) but has been recorded up to 2,500 m (8,200 ft).

== Behavior ==
=== Feeding ===
The eared poorwill forages for insects by sallying from trees or the ground. Beetles and moths appear to form the bulk of its diet.

=== Breeding ===
The eared poorwill apparently breeds between April and June. The clutch of two eggs is laid directly on the ground and both sexes incubate them.

=== Vocalization ===
The male eared poorwill's song is "a loud, abrupt 'peeyo' or 'peejo' that ends emphatically", and is given at night from a perch or the ground. It also makes "a descending, wavering 'teu-uu-uu'." Calls include "gwik", "wuik", and "chuck" notes.

== Status ==
The IUCN originally assessed the eared poorwill as Near Threatened but since 2004 has rated it as being of Least Concern. It has a large range and population, though the latter is thought to be decreasing. No immediate threats have been identified.
