= Chunox =

- Location within Belize
- Coordinates: 18°17′49″N 88°21′31″W
- Country: Belize
- District: Corozal District
- Constituency: Corozal South East

Population (2000)
  - Total: 1,143
- Time zone: UTC-6 (Central)
- Climate: Aw

Chunox is a village located in the Corozal District of Belize, with a population of 1,143 people. It is primarily an agricultural community surrounded by sugar cane fields, and is located on the east bank of Laguna Seca. The official language is English, but most residents speak Spanish due to their Maya Mestizo ancestry. St. Viator Vocational High School serves the village. There are several Maya residential mound groups in Chunox from the Classic Period. Copper Bank, a fishing village, is situated across the lagoon from Chunox.

== Demographics ==
At the time of the 2010 census, Chunox had a population of 1,375. Of these, 95.1% were Mestizo, 1.3% Mixed, 1.1% African, 1.0% Creole, 0.7% Ketchi Maya, 0.2% Caucasian, 0.2% Mennonite, 0.1% Mopan Maya and 0.1% others.

In terms of languages spoken (multiple answers allowed), 98.9% spoke Spanish, 24.0% English, 1.3% Creole, 0.2% Yucatec Maya and 0.1% German; 0.3% could not speak.
