= Gabriel Martinez (politician) =

Belizean politician

Gabriel Martinez is a Belizean politician. He is a former Minister of Labor, Local Government and Rural Development in Belize.
