= Corozal District =

Northernmost district of Belize

Coordinates: 18°15′N 88°20′W

- District
- Nickname: Coro
- Location of the district in Belize
- Country: Belize
- Capital: Corozal Town

Area
  - Total: 1,860 km^{2} (720 sq mi)

Population (2024 estimate)
  - Total: 46,071
  - Density: 24.8/km^{2} (64.2/sq mi)

Ethnic groups (2022 census)
  - Hispanic/ Mestizo: 77.2%
  - Mennonites: 8.9%
  - Creole: 7.4%
  - East Indian: 2.1%
  - Mayan: 1.1% (Note: 0.6% Yucatec, 0.3% Kʼicheʼ, 0.2% Mopan)
  - White: 1.0%
  - Garifuna: 0.6%
  - Chinese: 0.5%
  - Indian: 0.3%
  - Other: 0.3%

Languages spoken (2022 census)
  - Spanish: 76.7%
  - English: 62.7%
  - Creole: 17.8%
  - German: 7.7% (Note: Includes speakers of both Plautdietsch and Standard German)
  - Mayan: 1.2% (Note: 0.9% Yucatec, 0.2% Mopan, 0.1% Qʼeqchiʼ)
  - Chinese: 0.5%
  - Garifuna: 0.3%
  - Hindi: 0.3%
  - Other: 0.3%
- ISO 3166 code: BZ-CZL
- Website: www.quepasacorozal.com

Corozal is the northernmost district of the nation of Belize. The population was 46,071 in 2024. The district capital is Corozal Town.

Pre-Columbian Maya ruins are found in Corozal at Santa Rita near Corozal Town, and at Cerros.

== Administrative divisions ==
There are four political divisions in the Corozal District.

- Corozal Bay is represented by the Peoples United Party's David "Dido" Vega, in his first term. The division includes most of Corozal Town proper.
- Corozal North covers the villages immediately north and west of Corozal Town and is held by three-term representative Hugo Patt of the UDP.
- Corozal South East has long been a PUP stronghold under father and son Florencio Marin Sr. (who stepped down in 2008 after seven terms) and Florencio Marin Jr., who is now in his fourth term.
- Corozal South West is represented by the PUP representative Ramiro Ramirez, who beat incumbent Dr. Angel Campos of the UDP in 2020.

=== Towns and villages ===
Corozal District includes Corozal Town and the villages of Buena Vista, Calcutta, Caledonia, Carolina, Chan Chen, Chunox, Concepcion, Consejo, Copper Bank, Cristo Rey, Estrella, Libertad, Little Belize, Louisville, Paraiso, Patchacan, Progresso, Ranchito, San Andres, San Antonio, San Joaquin, San Narciso, San Roman, San Victor, San Pedro, Santa Clara, Santa Elena, Sarteneja, Xaibe, and Yo Chen.

In addition, the island of Ambergris Caye is geographically closer to Corozal District than the district in which it is administrated, Belize District.

== Demographics ==
=== Ethnicity ===
Ethnicity
Ethnicity	2010		2022	
%	Number	%	Number	%
Mestizo	30,061	76.03%	34,985	77.21%
European: * German (Mennonite) * British (Anglo-Celtic)	2,907; 2,566; 341	7.35% 6.49% 0.86%	4,445; 4,009; 436	9.81% 8.84% 0.96%
Creole	2,151	5.44%	3,340	7.37%
East Indian; Indian	1,142; 106	2.89% 0.27%	944; 117	2.08% 0.26%
Garifuna	235	0.59%	275	0.60%
Yucatec Maya	289	0.73%	269	0.59%
Chinese/Asian	266	0.67%	236	0.52%
Qʼeqchi Maya	68	0.17%	126	0.28%
Mopan Maya	84	0.21%	104	0.23%
Other	337	0.85%	146	0.32%
Not stated	–	–	324	0.71%
Mixed	1,893	4.79%	–	–
Total	39,539	100%	45,310	100%

=== Languages ===
English is the most spoken language in Corozal, followed by Spanish. 80% speak English very well and 60% speak Spanish very well.

Corozal's villages are divided by colour and language:

Corozal Town, the main centre of the District, is peopled by a mix of Belize's races and cultures, most notably the Maya Mestizos. Spanish and English are the major languages spoken.

Calcutta, Estrella Village, Libertad, Ranchito, and San Antonio are populated by East Indian people and speak English and Spanish very well.

Chan Chen, Chunox, Cristo Rey, Louisville, Patchakan, San Pedro, San Victor Village, Xaibe, and Yo Chen are populated by Maya people and speak Spanish and Yucatec Maya language very well, along with some English.

Buena Vista, Caledonia, Conception, San Narciso, San Roman, and Santa Clara are populated by Maya-Mestizo people who speak Spanish, some English and elders speaking Yucatec Maya. They are not obliged to learn English, because school teachers teach in Spanish but write in English and because at work the primary language is Spanish, so villagers are not exposed to English on a daily basis.

Progresso, San Andres, and Sarteneja Village are populated by Creole and Hispanic people, who share their cultures and languages in English and Spanish.

Little Belize is populated by Mennonites, who speak German.

== Economy ==
While Corozal District depended for many years on the sugar industry, at one time having its own sugar factory in Libertad Village, today the economy is more diversified. Sugar production and other agricultural crops such as papaya are still central to the way of life of many rural Corozalenos, but occupations in the tourism industry are slowly becoming more prominent. Now almost 65% of Corozalenos depend on the Commercial Free Zone for employment. The Zone is located on the border of Belize and Mexico.

Contraband is the biggest source of growing income in Corozal since it is adjacent to Mexico, and includes such things as vegetables, fruits, liquors, cigarettes, and gasoline.

== Education ==
Belize Adventist College and Belize Adventist Junior College are located in the village of Calcutta in the Corozal District. Corozal Community College and Corozal Junior College are found in the village of San Andres and also near San Antonio in Corozal District.

St. Viator Vocational High School is located just outside Chunox in the Corozal District.

Centro Escolar Mexico Junior College(CEMJC) and Escuela Secundaria Tecnica Mexico or E.S.T.M. is located in the village of San Roman in the Corozal District.
