= Indo-Belizeans =

Total population
- 7,000-8,000 (January 2016, est.)

Regions with significant populations
- Toledo District · Corozal District · Belize City

Languages
- Hindi-Urdu · Sindhi · Punjabi · Gujarati · Kutchi · Bengali · Tamil · Telugu (spoken by more recent immigrants and their descendants, either Belizean-born or Belizean-naturalized); Kriol · English · Spanish (common languages spoken in Belize); Caribbean Hindustani (spoken by the original Indian indentured immigrants and to a lesser extent spoken by their descendants)

Religion
- Hinduism · Christianity · Sikhism · Islam

Related ethnic groups
- Indo-Caribbeans · Indian people · Indian diaspora

Indo-Belizeans, also known as East Indian Belizeans, are citizens of Belize of Indian ancestry. The community made up 3.9% of the population of Belize in 2010. They are part of the wider Indo-Caribbean community, which itself is a part of the global Indian diaspora.

== History and demographics ==
Indians began arriving in Belize after the Indian Rebellion of 1857, with the first ship with Indians arriving in 1858 as part of the Indian indenture system set up by the British government after slavery was abolished. Initially coming in as indentured, many of them stayed on to work the sugar plantations and were joined by other Indian immigrants. Indians are spread out over many villages and towns primarily in the Corozal and Toledo districts and live in reasonably compact rural communities. Today, while there are few descendants of the original Indian indentured immigrants who are of full Indian descent, many of their descendants have intermarried with other ethnic groups in Belize, notably the Creoles and Mestizos. However, they are still identifiable through their physiognomy and are known as 'Hindus' or 'East Indians'. These set of Indians were almost entirely composed of people from the Bhojpur region, Awadh region, and other places in the Hindustani Belt in North India. A minority of indentured laborers were from South India and other regions throughout South Asia. Later on in the 1870s-90s Indian coffee workers from Guatemala and Indian sugar workers from Jamaica immigrated to Belize and in the 1950s-90s Indians from Guyana and Trinidad and Tobago emigrated. Their ancestors were also indentured immigrants and come from the same regions in India. It is from the original Indian indentured immigrants and the later group of Indian immigrants from other parts of the Caribbean that contributed to the Indian aspect of Belizean cuisine with foods such as roti (especially paratha, dhalpuri, and sada), wrap rotis, dhal bhat (dhal and rice), pholourie, bara, chokhas such as baigan chokha, khichiri, and tarcaris and curries such as curry chicken and curry goat.

After India gained independence in 1947 up to present-day, many Indians further migrated to Belize as businessmen, entrepreneurs, doctors, and other professionals. However, they were not from the same regions of India as the original Indian indentured immigrant were from, they were mostly Sindhis and Punjabis, with some Gujaratis, Kutchis, Bengalis, Tamils, and Telugus. Most Hindus in Belize today are Sindhi Hindus with few of the original descendants of the Indian indentured laborers retaining Hinduism and Islam.

In 1907, the Canadian Government made an unsuccessful attempt to transfer Indian independence activists residing in the province of British Columbia to Belize (then known as British Honduras). A Canadian delegation led by the chief clerk of the Canadian Ministry of the Interior Harkin, and a small Indian delegation including Teja Singh traveled to British Honduras in November 1907 to determine if conditions were suitable for the move. Upon his return to Canada, Teja Singh stated that Indians were being sent to Honduras for slave-labour and claimed that Canadian officials had attempted to bribe the Indian delegation to secure a positive report. The Canadian government blamed Teja Singh's statements for the failure of the proposed transfer.

== Notable people ==
- Payal Ghanwani, the first Indo-Belizean Senator
- Nora Parham, only Belizean woman to be executed
- Doug Singh, politician
- George Singh, former Chief Justice of the Supreme Court of Belize
- Lutchman Sooknandan, twice Director of Public Prosecutions, a native of Guyana born to a father from Kolkata
- Oscar Ramjeet, former Solicitor-General of Belize, born in Guyana
- Gian Ghandi, former Solicitor-General of Belize

== See also ==
- Belize § Demographics
- Hinduism in Belize
- Belize–India relations
