= List of archaeological periods =

The names for archaeological periods vary enormously from region to region. This is a list of the main divisions by continent and region. Dating also varies considerably and those given are broad approximations across wide areas.

The three-age system has been used in many areas, referring to the prehistorical and historical periods identified by tool manufacture and use, of Stone Age, Bronze Age and Iron Age. Since these ages are distinguished by the development of technology, it is natural that the dates to which these refer vary in different parts of the world. In many regions, the term Stone Age is no longer used, as it has been replaced by more specific geological periods. For some regions, there is need for an intermediate Chalcolithic period between the Stone Age and Bronze Age. For cultures where indigenous metal tools were in less widespread use, other classifications, such as the lithic stage, archaic stage and formative stage refer to the development of other types of technology and social organization.

Historical periods denotes periods of human development with the advantage of the development of writing. Written records tend to provide more socio-political insight into the dominant nations, and hence allow categorization according to the ruling empires and cultures, such as Hellenistic, Roman, Viking. Inevitably these definitions of periods only relate to the region of that empire or culture.

The Industrial age or Modern era is generally taken to refer to post-1800. From this time, the Industrial Revolution which began in Western Europe resulted in global trade and greatly increased cultural exchange.

== Archaeological period articles – by continent and region ==
Continents	Regions	Periods articles	Major periods
Africa	North Africa	North Africa	Paleolithic; Epipaleolithic; Neolithic c. 7500 BCE; Iron Age; Roman
Africa	Sub-Saharan Africa	Sub-Saharan Africa	Earlier Stone Age; Middle Stone Age; Later Stone Age; Neolithic c. 4000 BCE; Bronze Age (3500 – 600 BCE); Iron Age (550 BC – 700 CE); Classic Middle Ages (c. 700 – 1700 CE)
Asia	Near East	Levantine	Stone Age (2,000,000 – 3300 BCE); Bronze Age (3300 – 1200 BCE); Iron Age (1200 – 586 BCE); Historical periods (586 BCE – present)
Asia	South Asia	South Asian Periods	1) Paleolithic (c.53000 – 10000 BCE). 2) Mesolithic (c.10000 – 6500 BCE). 3) Neolithic (c. 6500 – 4000 BCE, up to c.2000 BC in some areas) see Mehrgarh and Bhirrana. 4) Chalcolithic (c. 4000 – 2000 BCE). 5) Bronze Age (c. 3100 – 1100 BCE) see Indus Valley civilization. 6) Iron Age (c. 1100 - 500 BCE). i) Proto-history (c.1500 - 500 BCE) known as Vedic period. ii) Historical period after 500 BCE.
Asia	East Asia	East Asia Periods	Neolithic c. 7500 BCE Pengtoushan culture
Asia	North Asia	North Asia Periods	
Asia	Korea	Korean Periods	Paleolithic c. 40,000/30,000 – c. 8000 BCE; Jeulmun pottery period c. 8000 – 1500 BCE; Mumun pottery period c. 1500 – 300 BCE; Protohistoric period c. 300 BCE – 300/400 CE; Three Kingdoms of Korea c. 300/400 – 668 CE
Asia	Japan	Japan Periods	Paleolithic c. 35,000 – c. 10,000 BCE; Jōmon period c. 10,000 – 300 BCE; Yayoi period c. 300 BCE – 250 CE; Yamato period c. 250 – 710 CE
Asia	China	China Periods	Paleolithic c. 1.36 million years ago Neolithic period c. 10,000 – 2100 BCE; Ancient China c. 2100 – 221 BCE; Imperial period c. 221 BCE – 1911 CE; Modern period
Americas	North America	North America	Lithic/Paleo-Indian (pre 8000 BCE); Archaic (c. 8000 – 1000 BCE); Woodland (1000 BCE to 1000 CE); Mississippian (800 CE to 1600 CE)
Americas	Mesoamerica	Mesoamerica	Lithic period (pre 8000 BCE); Archaic period (c. 8000 – 2000 BCE); Preclassic period (c. 2000 BCE – 250 CE); Classic period (250 – 900 CE); Postclassic period (900 – 1521)
Americas	South America	South America (Peru)	Lithic/Paleo-Indian (pre c. 8200 BCE); Archaic (c. 8200 – 1000 BCE); Formative (c. 1000 BCE – 500 CE); Classic (c. 500 – 1200 CE); Post-Classic (c. 1200 – 1900 CE)
Australasia	Australia	Australia	Indigenous Period (60,000 BCE – 1606 CE); European-Contact Pre-Settlement Period (1606 – 1788 CE); Settlement / Pre-Industrial Period (1788 – 1820 CE); Industrial/Modern (1820s – Present)
Australasia	New Zealand	New Zealand	Archaic period (1000 – 1350/1650 CE); Classic period (1350 – 1800; 1650 – 1800 in eastern South Island)
Australasia	Oceania	Oceania	
Europe	Northern Europe	Northern Europe	Nordic Stone Age Nordic Bronze Age (c. 1700 BCE - c. 500 BCE); Pre-Roman Iron Age (c. 500 BCE - c. 1 BCE); Roman Iron Age in northern Europe (c. 1 CE – 400 CE); Germanic Iron Age (c. 400 – 800 CE); Viking Age (c. 800 – 1066 CE); Medieval period (1066 – c. 1500); Post-medieval period (c. 1500 – c. 1800); Industrial/Modern
Europe	Western Europe	Western Europe	Paleolithic (pre c. 8800 BCE); Mesolithic (c. 8800 – 4900 BCE); Neolithic (c. 4900 – 2000 BCE); Bronze Age (c. 2000 – 800 BCE); Iron Age (c. late 11th century BCE – 1 BCE); Roman (c. 56 BCE – 400 CE); Early medieval period (c. 400 – 800 CE); Medieval period (800 – c. 1500); Post-medieval period (c. 1500 – c. 1800); Industrial/Modern
Europe	Southeastern Europe	Southeastern Europe	Paleolithic; Epipaleolithic; Neolithic; Chalcolithic; Bronze Age; Iron Age; Hellenistic; Roman; Byzantine period Ottoman Empire; Industrial/Modern

== See also ==
- List of time periods
