= Horizon (archaeology) =

Distinctive type of archaeological findings over a large geographical area

In archaeology, the general meaning of horizon is a distinctive type of sediment, artefact, style, or other cultural trait that is found across a large geographical area from a limited time period. The term derives from similar ones in geology, horizon or marker horizon, but where these have natural causes, archaeological horizons are caused by humans. Most typically, there is a change in the type of pottery found and in the style of less frequent major artefacts. Across a horizon, the same type of artefact or style is found very widely over a large area, and it can be assumed that these traces are approximately contemporary.

== General ==
The term is used to denote a series of stratigraphic relationships that constitute a phase or are part of the process of determining the archaeological phases of a site. An archaeological horizon can be understood as a break in contexts formed in the Harris matrix, which denotes a change in epoch on a given site by delineation in time of finds found within contexts.

An example of a horizon is the dark earth horizon in England, which separates Roman artefacts from medieval artefacts and which may indicate the abandonment of urban areas in Roman Britain during the 2nd to 5th centuries. The term "archaeological horizon" is sometimes, and somewhat incorrectly, used in place of the term layer or strata.

== Americas ==
In the archaeology of the Americas "Horizon" terminology, used as proper names, has become used for schemes of periodization of major periods. "Horizons" are periods of cultural stability and political unity, with "Intermediate periods" covering the politically fragmented transition between them. In the periodization of pre-Columbian Peru and the Central Andes, there are three Horizon periods with two Intermediate periods between them. The Horizons and their dominant cultures are: Early Horizon, Chavin; Middle Horizon, Tiwanaku and Wari culture; Late Horizon, Inca.

The same terms (Early, Middle, and Late Horizons) are sometimes used for the Mesoamerican chronology, though there the five stages defined by Gordon Willey and Philip Phillips in 1958 remain dominant, and the Formative stage, Classic stage, and Post-Classic stage cover approximately similar periods. More commonly, lower-case horizons such as an "Olmec horizon" are referred to for the region.

== See also ==
- Horizon (geology)
