= List of archaeological periods (Mesoamerica) =

Timeline of Pre-Columbian Mesoamerica

The chronology of Pre-Columbian Mesoamerica is usually divided into the following eras:

== Five-stage classification ==
One of the most enduring classifications of archaeological periods & cultures was established in Gordon Willey and Philip Phillips' 1958 book Method and Theory in American Archaeology. They divided the archaeological record in the Americas into 5 phases. These are:

- The Lithic stage
- The Archaic stage
- The Formative stage
- The Classic stage
- The Post-Classic stage

== Tabular list ==
Paleo-Indian (10,000–3500 BCE)	Honduras, Guatemala, Belize, obsidian and pyrite points, Iztapan			
Archaic (3500–1800 BCE)	Agricultural settlements, Tehuacán			
Preclassic (Formative) (2000 BCE–250 CE)	The start of states. The first large scale ceremonial architecture, development of cities. (Olmecs; Unknown culture in La Blanca and Ujuxte, Monte Alto culture)	Early Preclassic	Olmec area: San Lorenzo Tenochtitlan; Central Mexico: Chalcatzingo; Valley of Oaxaca: San José Mogote. The Maya area: Nakbe, Cerros	2000–1000 BCE
Preclassic (Formative) (2000 BCE–250 CE)	The start of states. The first large scale ceremonial architecture, development of cities. (Olmecs; Unknown culture in La Blanca and Ujuxte, Monte Alto culture)	Middle Preclassic	Olmec area: La Venta, Tres Zapotes; Maya area: El Mirador, Izapa, Lamanai, Xunantunich, Naj Tunich, Takalik Abaj, Kaminaljuyú, Uaxactun; Valley of Oaxaca: Monte Albán	1000–400 BCE
Preclassic (Formative) (2000 BCE–250 CE)	The start of states. The first large scale ceremonial architecture, development of cities. (Olmecs; Unknown culture in La Blanca and Ujuxte, Monte Alto culture)	Late Preclassic	Maya area: Uaxactun, Tikal, Edzná, Cival, San Bartolo, Altar de Sacrificios, Piedras Negras, Ceibal, Rio Azul; Central Mexico: Teotihuacan; Gulf Coast: Epi-Olmec culture	400 BCE–200 CE
Classic (200–900 CE)	Height of the nation-states. (Classic Maya centers, Teotihuacan, Zapotecs)	Early Classic	Maya area: Calakmul, Caracol, Chunchucmil, Copán, Naranjo, Palenque, Quiriguá, Tikal, Uaxactun, Yaxha; Teotihuacan apogee; Zapotec apogee.	200–600 CE
Classic (200–900 CE)	Height of the nation-states. (Classic Maya centers, Teotihuacan, Zapotecs)	Late Classic	Maya area: Uxmal, Toniná, Cobá, Waka', Pusilhá, Xultún, Dos Pilas, Cancuen, Aguateca; Central Mexico: Xochicalco, Cacaxtla, Cholula; Gulf Coast: El Tajín and Classic Veracruz culture	600–900 CE
Classic (200–900 CE)	Height of the nation-states. (Classic Maya centers, Teotihuacan, Zapotecs)	Terminal Classic	Maya area: Puuc sites – Uxmal, Labna, Sayil, Kabah	800–900/1000 CE
Postclassic (900–1519 CE)	Collapse of many of the great nations and cities of the Classic Era. Formation of new kingdoms and empires. (Aztec, Toltec, Purépecha, Mixtec, Totonac, Pipil, Itzá, Kowoj, K'iche', Kaqchikel, Poqomam, Mam)	Early Postclassic	Tula, Mitla, Tulum, Topoxte, Chichen Itza	900–1200 CE
Postclassic (900–1519 CE)	Collapse of many of the great nations and cities of the Classic Era. Formation of new kingdoms and empires. (Aztec, Toltec, Purépecha, Mixtec, Totonac, Pipil, Itzá, Kowoj, K'iche', Kaqchikel, Poqomam, Mam)	Late Postclassic	Tenochtitlan, Cempoala, Tzintzuntzan, Mayapán, Ti'ho, Utatlán, Iximche, Mixco Viejo, Zaculeu	1200–1519 CE
Post Conquest (Until 1697 CE)	Central Peten: Tayasal, Zacpeten			

== See also ==
Historiography

- Periodisation of Mesoamerican history
- List of archaeological periods (Belize)
- List of archaeological periods (North America)
- List of archaeological periods (Peru)
- List of archaeological periods – worldwide
- List of pre-Columbian cultures – Americas

Other

- History of the Americas
- Genetic history of indigenous peoples of the Americas
- Archaeology of the Americas
- Archaeogenetics
