= Classic period in Belize =

Historical period in Belize, 250–900

Coordinates: 17.0°N 88.5°W

Classic
- 250–900
Preclassic	Postclassic
- Location: Belize
- Including: Early (to 600); Late (to 800); Terminal (to 900)
- Monarchs: Te' K'ab Chaak (first of Caracol); Ruler XIII (last of Caracol); K'awiil Chan K'inich (first of Pusilha); K'awiil Chan (last of Pusilha); Foliated Jaguar (second of Tikal); Jasaw Chan Kʼawiil II (last of Tikal)
- Key events: Demographic, social, artistic, intellectual development; Classic Collapse

The Classic period of Belizean, Maya, and Mesoamerican history began with the advent of Mayan monumental inscriptions in AD 250, and ended with the decline of these inscriptions during the Classic Maya Collapse in AD 900. (Note: The Classic period is variously dated in literature (see Periodisation of the history of Belize for further discussion). For instance, it is dated from 250–900 or 250–1100 by Sharer & Traxler 2006, pp. 98, 155, 250–909 by Martin & Grube 2008, p. 8, 150–900 or 300–650 by Adams & Macleod 2000a, p. 11, and 150–900 by Martin 2020, p. 1. However, Adams & Macleod 2000a, p. 205 later place the period in 250–900 ie between Long Count dates of 8.10.10.0.0 – 10.4.0.0.0, based on the 'most widely accepted' calendrical correlation which equates the 11.16.0.0.0 Long Count date to 12 November 1539.) (Note: Martin & Grube 2008, p. 13 use the Goodman–Martinez–Thompson correlation with a two-day addition, ie GMT+2, to convert Maya Long Count dates into Julian ones, given that said correlation 'best fits [various] diverse criteria, and is now almost universally accepted [in Mayanist scholarship].' Sharer & Traxler 2006, pp. 279–284 follow the GMT correlation with a 584,283 correlation constant. A calculator is available from the Foundation for the Advancement of Mesoamerican Studies.)

== Geography ==
During the pre-Columbian era, Belize formed part of the Maya Lowlands of the Maya Region of Mesoamerica. Traditionally, the first-order subdivisions of the latter follow cultural or political boundaries of Preclassic, Classic, or Postclassic civilisations, e.g. Mayas and Aztecs. The Maya region of Mesoamerica is one such. It, in turn, is further subdivided physiographically into at least three regions, i.e. the Maya Lowlands, Highlands, and Pacific. The first of these second-order subdivisions, which fully encompassed Belize, is still further subdivided into northern, central, and southern portions, called the Northern, Central, and Southern Lowlands. Belizean territory north of Indian Creek i.e. Nim Li Punit is often included within the Central Lowlands, fully encompassing five of Belize's districts, and an upper portion of Toledo. Territory south of Indian Creek, including Nim Li Punit, is often placed within the Southern Lowlands, encompassing the central and lower portions of Toledo. (Note: However, alternative first-order subdivisions of the Maya region (ie second-order subdivisions of Mesoamerica) are sometimes given, eg Martin & Grube 2008, p. 10 give these as Northern, Central, and Southern Areas, eg Adams & Macleod 2000a, p. 200 give them as Northern Lowlands, Southern Lowlands, and Highlands (though later, in Adams & Macleod 2000a, pp. 203–204, give them as Lowlands and Highlands).)

== History ==
=== Early ===
==== Fall of El Mirador ====
The onset of the Classic period in the Lowlands saw the completion of the fall and abandonment of El Mirador, which had begun in the Terminal Preclassic. Having been the pre-eminent power across the central Lowlands during the Preclassic, its collapse is thought to have been felt across this sphere of influence, possibly leading to political, economic, or social distress in previously subordinate centres, and certainly creating a power vacuum in the central Lowlands.

==== Rise of Tikal ====
Tikal, and to a lesser extent various other Lowland states, promptly rose to prominence upon El Mirador's demise, with the former becoming 'the largest Classic city of the Peten region and among the largest of all Maya sites.' (Note: Other emerging states included Blackman Eddy, Caracol, Pacbitun, Uaxactun, and Calakmul (Sharer & Traxler 2006, p. 317).) Significantly, Tikal Stela 29, likely installed by Foliated Jaguar circa 8.12.14.8.15 (i.e. 6 July 292 Greg), is deemed a 'hallmark' or 'the best evidence of Tikal's emergence as the capital of an independent polity,' as it portrays the king donning various important regnal symbols, most notably a double-headed serpent bar and the capital's emblem glyph.

==== Teotihuacan influence ====
From at least circa 300, Teotihuacan is thought to have begun exerting cultural, commercial, and perhaps even political influence over Tikal and the surrounding Lowlands. Their influence seems to have especially increased after 8.17.1.4.12 (i.e. 14 January 378 Greg), the day when Siyaj K'ak' of Teotihuacan is thought to have conquered Tikal. (Note: Teotihuacan influence may have arrived via Kaminaljuyu (in the Maya Highlands), rather than directly from Teotihuacan itself (Sharer & Traxler 2006, pp. 321–322). Siyaj K'ak' may have also been from Kaminaljuyu (Sharer & Traxler 2006, p. 322).) Post-conquest Tikal would then embark on a successful expansionist programme of military conquest and strategic royal marriages 'that would see it become the dominant power in the central Lowlands.' The 411–456 reign of Siyaj Chan K'awiil of Tikal would apparently mark both the apogee of that city's hegemony, and the complete synthesis of local and foreign traditions.

==== Hiatus ====
The late Early Classic Hiatus was a stretch of sixty years in 534 – 593 i.e. 9.5.0.0.0 – 9.8.0.0.0 'when few dated monuments were erected' in cities across the Central Lowlands, but most especially in Tikal, which had entered 'a time of decline and dynastic turmoil.' In particular, the 562 fall of Tikal to a Calakmul-Caracol alliance is thought to have 'plunged much of the central Lowlands into a series of wars,' thereby upsetting 'the established Lowland order' and ushering in 'a whole new era in the political development of the Maya Lowlands.'

=== Late ===
The Late Classic is traditionally deemed the 'apogee' of Maya civilisation.

==== Rise and fall of Calakmul ====
The power vacuum left by Tikal's conquest was swiftly filled by Calakmul, judging from extant records of their alliances and military victories scattered 'throughout the Lowlands.' The 636–686 reign of Yuknoom the Great marked the apogee of Calakmul's power. This would nevertheless be brought to an end by Jasaw Chan K'awiil I of Tikal, whose 695 conquest of Calakmul sought to restore Tikal to its former pre-eminence. This restorative programme would be completed by K'awiil I's successor, Yik'in Chan K'awiil, via a series of successful military manoeuvres in 736–744, thereby inaugurating 'the most successful k'atun in Tikal's history.'

=== Terminal ===
The Terminal Classic saw the demise of 'almost all' states in the central and southern Lowlands, even as polities in the northern reaches 'continued to prosper.'

== Demographics ==
=== Classes ===
Classic Maya societies are known to have been stratified into at least two classes, i.e. the elite and common ones, with 'somewhat fluid' distinctions between these defined by descent, occupation, wealth, and accomplishments, among other factors. Most notably, elite status was typically signalled by wealth, privilege, and supernatural associations, though an emerging non-elite middle class may have later detracted from wealth as a status-marker.

==== Elite ====
The elite class constituted a small minority of the population, but have historically been the focus of Mayanist scholarship. By at least the Late Classic, the elite class are thought to have been 'internally ranked by differences in status, wealth, and power.'

==== Non-elite ====
The non-elite class constituted 'the vast majority of the population.' Despite this, they are 'not even mentioned' in Classic Mayan texts, and until the 2000s were heavily understudied by archaeologists. Archaeological findings suggest that by the Late Classic the non-elite class were considerably stratified via the emergence of a commercially prosperous 'middle class.'

=== Population ===
Average population densities of Classic Maya cities have been estimated at 1,554 people per square mile (600 per square kilometre). Additionally, settlement studies have yielded surprisingly high mean population densities for the rural central Lowlands. Late Classic estimates for the upper Belize River Valley (surrounding Xunantunich) range from 881 to 1,360 inhabitants per square mile (340–525 per square kilometre), while those for the Paten central lakes area (surrounding Tikal) are about 518 per square mile (200 per square kilometre). The Late Classic urban-cum-rural population of the central Lowlands is thereby estimated 'in the tens of millions of people,' and thought to have constituted 'one of the world's most densely populated preindustrial societies.' The Late Classic, in particular, is thought to have marked the peak of Maya population in the Lowlands.

== Technology ==
=== Astronomy ===
Classic Maya astronomy has been likened to that of the Babylonian civilisation, as contrasted with that of the likes of Kepler and Copernicus. In particular, stars, moons, and planets were thought to embody deities, and their observation was believed to aid in prophesying.

==== Celestial bodies studied ====
The sun, moon, Venus, and the North Star are known to have been heavily studied in the Classic period. There is some evidence to suggest that Mars, Jupiter, and Saturn may also have been studied or observed. (Note: Namely, (i) the Dresden Codex features Martian tables, (ii) several eighth-century events in Palenque are thought to have been deliberately timed 'to coincide with auspicious positions of Jupiter,' and (iii) an Classic inscription on the Dumbarton Oaks Relief Panel 1 references Saturn (Sharer & Traxler 2006, pp. 117–118).)

Assigned and actual periods or revolutions of various celestial bodies studied by Classic Mayas in Belize.
Body	Assigned Period	Actual Period	Unit	Notes
Sun	365.0000	365.2422	solar days	discrepancy noticed but not corrected
Moon	29.53020	29.53059	solar days	discrepancy possibly unnoticed
Venus	584.00	583.92	solar days	discrepancy noticed and corrected
Mars	c × 78	780	solar days	possibly; where c = an integral constant
Jupiter	–	–	solar days	possibly

==== Instruments and practice ====
Classic Maya astronomers employed 'long sight lines and horizontal markers that allowed accuracy to within less than a day in fixing the synodical or apparent revolution of many celestial bodies.' Their naked-eye observatories are thought to have been placed atop elevated hills or buildings, with celestial movements noted with reference to some fixed feature on the horizon. (Note: Though actual sighting devices, apparently used during naked-eye observations, are not extant (Sharer & Traxler 2006, p. 118). Such devices are represented, for instance, in the Nuttall, Selden, and Bodleian Codices (Sharer & Traxler 2006, p. 120, fig. 3.12).) For instance, Copan Stela 10 (on an eastern hilltop) is thought to have formed part of an east–west sight line, with Stela 12 employed as the corresponding fixed feature on the western horizon, as these align with annual sunsets on 12 April. Similarly, the notable E Groups in various Classic sites (first discovered in Uaxactun) are thought to have each formed three east–west sight lines possibly used 'to mark the positions of equinoxes and solstices' (via solar alignment on 21 March, 21 June, 23 September, and 21 December).

=== Time-keeping ===
Classic Maya time-keeping has been described as 'a sophisticated system of arithmetic and a series of complex calendars' producing 'endless cycles of time' which were employed by aristicratic and priestly classes for 'both mystical and practical purposes.' (Note: Sharer & Traxler 2006, p. 102 note that the 'elite probably guarded the full knowledge of the Maya calendar, since it was a source of great power,' though they further add that one may assume 'that even the poorest farmer had some knowledge of the basic system [of time-keeping] to guide his family's daily life.')

==== Units ====
The basic calendrical unit employed was the k'in i.e. the solar day. These were progressively composed, usually in vigesimal steps, into further calendrical units as follows.

Calendrical units of Classic Maya time-keeping in Belize. (Note: Classic Mayan names for calendrical units are only partially known (Sharer & Traxler 2006, p. 102).)
Unit	Unit	Days
1 k'in	–	1
20 k'in	1 winal	20
18 winal	1 tun	360
20 tun	1 k'atun	7,200
20 k'atun	1 bak'tun	144,000
20 bak'tun	1 piktun	2,880,000
20 piktun	1 kalabtun	57,600,000
20 kalabtun	1 kinchiltun	1,152,000,000
20 kinchiltun	1 alawtun	23,040,000,000

==== Cycles ====
The various calendrical units were further composed into several cyclical counts, with the 260-day almanac, the 365-day year, and 52-year Calendar Round (all common to Mesoamerica) being the most popular during the Classic period.

Calendrical cycles or counts of Classic Maya time-keeping in Belize. (Note: The Native? column notes whether the cycle or count as common across Classic Mesoamerica (i.e. was not native) or common only in the Maya Region (i.e. was native). Various astronomical cycles or counts were possibly used in the Classic period, but are poorly understood in literature, and so are omitted here (Sharer & Traxler 2006, pp. 117–118).)
Name	Native?	Composition	Days	Notes
Almanac	No	20 months × 13 days	260	for sacred, ceremonial, or prophetic use
Haab	No	19 months × 20 days + 1 month × 5 days	365	approximated the solar year (Note: Mayas are thought to have been aware of the Haab–solar year discrepancy of circa 0.2422 solar days, though there is no evidence showing that this was corrected (Sharer & Traxler 2006, p. 116).)
–	Yes	–	819	associated with four cardinal points
–	Yes	5 synodical revolutions of Venus	2,920	for astronomy (Note: Resulting in a synodical period of circa 584.00 solar days, compared to the currently-accepted value of circa 583.92 solar days (Sharer & Traxler 2006, p. 117). However, Sharer & Traxler 2006, p. 117 states that, though the Mayas set the period at 584 days, 'they knew that this value was a bit too long by eight-hundreths of a day' and accordingly accommodated or corrected for this discrepancy.)
–	Yes	149 lunar months	4,400	for astronomy (Note: Resulting in a lunar month of circa 29.53020 solar days, compared to the currently-accepted value of circa 29.53059 solar days (Sharer & Traxler 2006, p. 116).)
Calendar Round	No	1460 months × 13 days	18,980	formed from Almanac and Haab
Long Count	Yes	13 bak'tuns	1,872,000	used for monumental inscriptions; start-date fixed to 0.0.0.0.0 (i.e. 11 Aug 3114 BC Greg); end-date fixed to 13.0.0.0.0 (i.e. AD 21 Dec 2012) (Note: Though the earliest Long Count inscriptions date to the Late Preclassic period (Sharer & Traxler 2006, p. 110).)

==== Distance dates ====
Classic monumental inscriptions often record dates by giving a Long Count base-date and thereafter providing distance numbers i.e. the number of days to be counted forwards or backwards from said base-date so as to reach the desired date. This is thought to have made chiselling easier, as a single (but cumbersome) Long Count date could thereby be used to easily furnish numerous other dates. (Note: Long Count dates were usually recorded together with Calendar Round dates, thereby requiring the chiselling of ten glyphs, ie an introductory glyph, five Long Count glyphs, and four Calendar Round glyphs (Sharer & Traxler 2006, pp. 110–112).) For instance, the Quirigua Monument 6 Stela F records a Long Count base-date of 9.16.10.0.0 (i.e. AD 15 March 761 Greg), and later provides a distance number in the form of an earlier Calendar Round date of 1 Ajaw 13 Yaxk'in, resulting in a well-specified date of over 90 million years ago without incurring the cost of chiselling a further Long Count date.

==== Period-ending dates ====
Late Classic monumental inscriptions also record k'atun end-dates by providing only one-fifths of the Long Count date (i.e. the k'atun number) together with the full Calendar Round date. For instance, the Long Count date of 9.16.0.0.0 (i.e. AD 7 May 751 Greg, marking the end-date of the sixteenth k'atun) might rather be inscribed as k'atun 16 2 Ajaw 13 Sek.

=== Record-keeping ===
Classic Maya record-keeping has been deemed 'the most detailed' out of all such Amerindian traditions, leading to an extant corpus that, though fragmented, 'is far and away the most extensive and data rich of any Native American society.' Records were kept both on durable media, like stone and ceramic, and on non-durable media, like bark-paper. Many examples of the former are extant and legible, while none the latter have survived in legible form. (Note: All extant Mayan codices which are legible date to AD 1200 or later (Sharer & Traxler 2006, p. 120). The loss of earlier codices is often attributed, at least in part, to the Spanish conquest and subsequent inquisition, with the loss of remaining codices often blamed on neglect or the tropical environment (Sharer & Traxler 2006, p. 126).) (Note: Though access to Classic Mayan records 'can still be a daunting task,' many or most of these are being collected and published by the Peabody Museum's Corpus of Maya Hieroglyphic Inscriptions (Sharer & Traxler 2006, p. 130).)

==== Contents of records ====
Until the late 20th century, most Mayanists thought Classic records 'were devoted entirely to astronomy, astrology, and calendrics, in spite of [Spanish] colonial accounts that spoke of pre-Columbian Maya histories, genealogies, medical texts, and treatises on plants and animals.' With the decipherment of the Mayan script, epigraphists discovered Classic records dealing with historical events, including 'birth, death, establishment, conquest, destruction, and other fundamentals of individual and social existence,' similarly to Old World records.

==== Language of records ====
Classic records from the Maya Lowlands, which represent the bulk of the surviving corpus from the period, are widely thought to have been written 'in a courtly or prestigious form of Ch'olan,' the ancestral Mayan language of present-day Ch'olti' and Ch'orti' languages. (Note: The courtly or prestigious form of Ch'olan used in Classic records is known as Classic Mayan (Sharer & Traxler 2006, p. 132). Yukatek was previously proposed as a language used in some Classic records, but the consensus now favours predominantly Ch'olan-derived Classic Mayan, with Sharer & Traxler 2006, p. 132 noting that 'Ch'olan spellings, in contrast to Yukatekan, predominate in the Classic texts.')

=== Ceramics ===
The Preclassic–Classic transition in the ceramic traditions of the Lowlands and wider Maya Region is traditionally marked by the widespread adoption of polychrome pottery, especially that decorated with red-and-black geometric motifs in bands laid over an orange or cream base. (Note: Including, for instance, Holmol I-style polychrome vessels introduced in circa AD 250 in northeastern Peten (Sharer & Traxler 2006, p. 294).)

== Economy ==
Our understanding of Classic Maya economy 'is far from complete,' with our only extant records on commerce being 'a few graphic depictions of tribute goods on Classic period pottery and the Bonampak murals, the [Classic] Mayan inscriptions [being] generally silent on economic subjects.'

A consensus holds among scholars that kings 'commanded a sizeable workforce through corvee labour and controlled much of the production and trade in prestige goods,' but there is debate regarding the 'extent of their management of the production and distribution of food and other necessities of everyday life.' For instance, while there is little evidence to suggest that the state regulated farming to any significant degree (except in Caracol), there is 'good evidence' that it likely regulated trade in foodstuffs via control of the capital's marketplaces. (Note: In Caracol's territory, estimated at about 2,124 sq mi (5,500 km^{2}) by the Late Classic, 'the unprecedented extent and density of agricultural terraces implies some degree of state management of these facilities' (Sharer & Traxler 2006, pp. 708, 713).) Additionally, access to regional riverine and coasting trade were assiduously regulated and taxed by strategically located states. In the central Lowlands, for instance, Tikal, Calakmul, and El Mirador are each thought to have become wealthy 'largely because of their location, which commanded east–west trade routes across the Peten.' Similarly, access to rare resources in widespread demand is thought to have been tightly controlled by nearby centres, like Colha, which monopolised the good-quality flint in their environs.

== Society ==
=== Astrology ===
There is some evidence to suggest the Classic period use of a zodiac of thirteen signs or houses, each embodied by an animal, i.e. those recorded in pages 23 and 24 of the Paris Codex.

=== Cosmology ===
Classic Maya cosmology approached that of medieval Europeans, with 'the earth as the centre of [a] universe governed by supernatural powers.' Their world was 'as an ordered place, controlled by an array of deities' personified in celestial bodies (sun, moon, planets, stars). Good fortune and order held while the gods were pleased with the people, whereas misfortune and unpredictable events were 'explained as the actions of vengeful deities expressing their displeasure with human failings' to observe prescribed rituals and make appropriate offerings. Cycles of time, as marked by the predictable movements of celestial gods, held a place of 'central importance in the world order.' That is, 'in the ancient Maya scheme of things, time itself was animate and provided the fundamental order for the universe.'

=== Religion ===
Classic Maya religion is thought to have emerged from ancient shamanistic tradition, which 'can be traced back to Asia and probably arrived in the Americas with the first migrants into this new continent.' The earliest Maya priests are thought to have been specialised or elite shamans, devoted 'to the management of the calendar to maintain the world order, public divination, and other rituals performed to ensure success and prosperity.' As Maya society grew more complex, religion and the clergy became institutionalised, with priests differentiating themselves from shamans by exclusive recruitment from the elite class, literacy and the development of codified esoteric knowledge, and a monopoly on 'the performance of rituals for the state.' This fusion of church and state was further personified in the divine king, whose 'spectatular public ceremonies' and private blood sacrifices were aimed to 'inspire awe and obedience in the populace,' protect subjects from misfortune, divine the will of gods (and thus the future), ensure the success of the state, and maintain the cosmos itself.

== Government ==
=== State ===
The size and nature of Classic states remain uncertain, with proposals ranging from a few regional-scale entities administered by centralised governments, to a multitude of small city-states with local government.

The head of state and government of Classic city-states was the k'uhul ajaw or divine king, though these were sometimes beholden to foreign over- or high kings i.e. especially powerful patron kings in a patron–client relationship. (Note: Classic divine kings were styled k'uhul k'antumaak in Caracol, rather than k'uuhul ajaw (Martin & Grube 2008, p. 87). Overkings ie patron kings were sometimes styled kaloomte' , eg as in Tikal (Sharer & Traxler 2006, p. 299). Heirs to the throne, titled ch'ok ajaw or baah ch'ok, are thought to have 'acquired' divinity only upon ascension to the throne (Sharer & Traxler 2006, pp. 148, 150).) Sovereigns usually held absolute temporal authority, notably including authority to tax or claim tribute of subjects and subordinate states or settlements, to claim corvée labour, to conduct affairs with other states, to preside over ritual sacrifices of prisoners of war, and sometimes further including authority to regulate the production and distribution of certain commodities. (Note: Patron kings, furthermore, held authority to preside over various state ceremonies in their client states, including accession ceremonies (Sharer & Traxler 2006, p. 299).) Further, a 'mantle of supernatural sanctions protected all of these powers,' as a sovereign's divine right to rule was commonly accepted and assiduously fostered by royal houses. On the other hand, sovereigns were commonly held responsible for engaging and appeasing the many deities of the Maya pantheon, as this was thought necessary for the good order and fortune of the state and the wider universe.

A sovereign's court or privy council is thought to have almost always been constituted by members of the royal house or other elite families. Candidates may have included the heir apparent, various lords and ladies, and other non-titled elites. (Note: The heir apparent was often a son or younger brother, though non-male junior members of the royal household were not barred from the throne (Sharer & Traxler 2006, p. 297). Lords and ladies held, ajaw and ix ajaw titles, respectively (Sharer & Traxler 2006, p. 298). Subordinate offices of state may have included saja and yajaw, ie subordinate-lord and vassal-lord, respectively (Sharer & Traxler 2006, pp. 150, 298–299).) The council in particular is thought to have been 'an ancient institution, with roots as far back as the Preclassic.' Whereas the office of divine kingship peaked in the Late Classic and crumbled in the Terminal, 'the power of these governing councils increased, even becoming the ultimate authority in some polities during the Postclassic.'

Other offices of state included military and ecclesiastical ones. At the top of the military hierarchy (other than the sovereign) were two war captains, one hereditary and one appointed to office for three year periods, both of whom 'discussed the affairs of war and put them in order.' Heading the ecclesiastical order was a high priest, charged with advising the king, keeping sacred books, training new priests, and appointing them to their respective parishes.

=== Relations ===
Differences in 'resources, wealth, and military forces clearly made some kings [and their city-states] far more powerful than others' in the Lowlands, with the sovereigns of Tikal and Calakmul explicitly recognised 'as overlords by a number of rulers of less-powerful polities,' like Caracol. Even as these regional powers waged wars over centuries to dominate the Lowlands, peripheral states 'attempted with varying degrees of success to avoid direct involvement in this conflict, while conducting their own versions of power politics to maintain or increase their wealth and authority.' Small city-states in the Belize River Valley (like Buenavista and Cahal Pech), for instance, 'produced fine polychrome vessels in palace workshops that were used as currency to maintain alliances and trading partnerships with the royal house of Naranjo [Peten] and other kingdoms [in an attempt to avoid direct military engagement],' while those in the Mopan Valley (Peten) waged their own small game of thrones.

== Warfare ==
Classic warfare is thought to have played an increasingly crucial role in the rise or fall of a state's wealth and power. As in the Preclassic, warfare early in the Classic period is thought to have been limited to small-scale raids undertaken for acquire booty, tribute, and captives for labour and sacrifice, with weaker states or settlements usually targeted (rather than stronger rival states). However, as the Classic period progressed, these limited raids morphed into large-scale, intense battles, with wars being increasingly waged for military prestige. Some of the most destructive and bloodiest examples of the latter were star wars, waged by powerful states against a rival state with the aim of conquering it, often via the capture of its sovereign.

== Sites ==
Classic sites in Belize and surrounding Lowlands / large, very large sites only / Uxmal+ = Uxmal, Tiho / Xunantunich+ = Xunantunich, Actuncan / A = Arenal / EM = El Mirador / G = Guaycamayo / PN = Piedras Negras / via 2010 Witschey & Brown

Prominent excavated sites in Belize with Classic artefacts, material, or structures. (Note: Not including various unnamed or minor Classic sites.)
Emblem	Name	District	Size
–	Actuncan	Cayo	Large
	Altun Ha	Belize	Large
–	Arenal	Cayo	Large
–	Baking Pot	Cayo	Small
–	Barton Ramie	Cayo	Small
–	Bajo Hill	Orange Walk	Small
–	Buenavista	Cayo	Large
Unavailable	Cahal Pech	Cayo	Large
–	Caledonia	Corozal	Small
–	Camelote	Cayo	Large
	Caracol	Cayo	Very large
–	Chac Balam	Belize	Small
–	Chau Hiix	Belize	Small
–	Cuello	Orange Walk	Small
–	Dos Hombres	Orange Walk	Large
–	El Pilar	Cayo	Small
–	Guaycamayo	Cayo	Large
?	La Milpa	Orange Walk	Large
	Lamanai	Orange Walk	Large
–	Lubaantun	Toledo	Small
–	Maax Na	Orange Walk	Large
–	Minanha	Cayo	Small
Unavailable	Nim Li Punit	Toledo	Small
–	Nohmul	Orange Walk	Small
–	Pacbitun	Cayo	Large
–	Pulltrouser Swamp	Corozal	Small
Unavailable	Pusilha	Toledo	Small
–	San Estevan	Orange Walk	Small
	Xunantunich	Cayo	Large

== Timeline ==
Prominent Classic events in Belize or the Maya Lowlands. (Note: Dates correlated using the GMT correlation and a 584283 constant as per the FAMSI online calculator, unless otherwise noted.)
Greg	Jul	Long Ct	Event	Notes
6 Jul 292	6 Jul 292	8.12.14.8.15	Earliest Long Count date in the Lowlands	i.e. on Tikal Stela 29; cf
2 Jan 331 – 1 Jan 350	1 Jan 331 – 31 Dec 349	8.14.13.9.13 – 8.15.12.14.12	Reign of Te' K'ab Chaak of Caracol	i.e. earliest known king in Belize; cf (Note: Upper and lower temporal bounds provided, as precise dates not available (Martin & Grube 2008, p. 86).)
14 Jan 378	13 Jan 378	8.17.1.4.12	Arrival of entrada of Sihyaj K'ahk' and Spearthrower Owl of Teotihuacan to Tikal	i.e. death of Chak Tok Ich'aak I of Tikal; cf
11 Sep 379	10 Sep 379	8.17.2.16.17	Accession of Yax Nuun Ahiin I of Tikal	cf
11 Apr 484	10 Apr 484	9.2.9.0.16	Accession of Yajaw Te' K'inich I of Caracol	i.e. earliest known accession in Belize; cf
28 Jan 495	27 Jan 495	9.3.0.0.0	Earliest dedication of a Great Ajaw altar in Belize	i.e. a Caracol altar; cf
13 Apr 531	11 Apr 531	9.4.16.13.3	Accession of K'an I of Caracol	i.e. earliest known accession in Belize presided by a foreign overlord; cf
16 Apr 553	14 Apr 553	9.5.19.1.2	Caracol–Tikal axe war	i.e. defeat of Caracol; cf
29 Apr 562	27 Apr 562	9.6.8.4.2	Caracol–Tikal star war	i.e. defeat of Tikal and onset of the Tikal Hiatus; cf (Note: The identity of the victor is uncertain, though Caracol, Calakmul ie the Snake kingdom ie the Snake polity, or both, have been suggested (Martin & Grube 2008, pp. 89–90).)
–	? Sep 584	–	Arrival of Lady Batz' Ek' to Caracol	i.e. earliest politically active queen mother in Belize; cf
–	? Feb 680	–	Caracol–Naranjo star war	i.e. defeat of Caracol and onset of Caracol Hiatus; cf
13 Mar 830	9 Mar 830	10.0.0.0.0	Latest dedication of a Great Ajaw altar in Belize	i.e. a Caracol altar; cf
7 Oct 859	3 Oct 859	10.1.10.0.0	Latest Long Count date in Caracol	i.e. on Caracol Stela 10; cf
18 Jan 909	13 Jan 909	10.4.0.0.0	Latest Long Count date in the Lowlands	i.e. on Tonina Monument 101; cf

== Scholarship ==
The earliest amateur work on Maya sites in Belize, possibly Preclassic ones, is attributed to George Henderson, a Bayman, who in 1809 published 'a tantalisingly short description of mounds along the Belize River.' Site-focussed excavations were begun by Thomas Gann in 1894, and presented to the Society of Antiquaries of London on 16 May 1895. However, 'the rudimentary beginnings of archaeological research were not followed by similar efforts in Belize for a good many years,' i.e. until 1925–1939 work by the British Museum, the Carnegie Institution, Field Museum, and J. E. S. Thompson, among others. (Note: It has been suggested that Gann's work prompted the first legislative protections for antiquities in colonial Belize in 1894, and their subsequent strengthening in 1897, 1924, and 1927.(Wallace 2011, p. 25, Hammond 1983, p. 22). His 1894–1936 career has been described as 'more destructive than protective of evidence from beginning to end' (Pendergast 1993, p. 4). However, it has also been pointed out that his work, if judged by archaeological standards of his time, rather than by modern ones, would not be so harshly judged–though it would still be found wanting (Wallace 2011, pp. 24–26).)

== See also ==
- Pre-Columbian Belize
- Classic Maya collapse
- Classic period in the Maya Region
- Classic stage in the Americas

== Notes and references ==
=== Full citations ===
==== Journals ====
1. Akers PD, Brook GA, Railsback LB, Liang F, Iannone G, Webster JW, Reeder PP, Cheng H, Edwards RL (1 October 2016). "An extended and higher-resolution record of climate and land use from stalagmite MC01 from Macal Chasm, Belize, revealing connections between major dry events, overall climate variability, and Maya sociopolitical changes". Palaeogeography, Palaeoclimatology, Palaeoecology. 459: 268–288. Bibcode:2016PPP...459..268A. doi:10.1016/j.palaeo.2016.07.007.
2. Awe JJ, Ebert CE, Stemp WJ, Brown MK, Sullivan LA, Garber JF (2021). "Lowland Maya Genesis: The Late Archaic to Late Early Formative Transition in the Upper Belize River Valley". Ancient Mesoamerica. 32 (3): 519–544. doi:10.1017/S0956536121000420. S2CID 245125325.
3. Fox AH (1871). "Thursday, March 2nd, 1871". Proceedings of the Society of Antiquaries of London. Second Series. 5 (2): 93–95. doi:10.1017/S0950797300011616. hdl:2027/hvd.hw2a3c.
4. Franks AW (1877). "Remarks on Stone Implements from Honduras". Journal of the Anthropological Institute of Great Britain and Ireland. 6: 37–40. doi:10.2307/2841243. hdl:2027/hvd.32044042253526. JSTOR 2841243.
5. Gann T (1895). "On Exploration of Two Mounds in British Honduras". Proceedings of the Society of Antiquaries of London. Second Series. 15: 430–434. hdl:2027/uiug.30112118719803.
6. Hammond N (March 1983). "The Development of Belizean Archaeology". Antiquity. 57 (219): 19–27. doi:10.1017/S0003598X00054946. S2CID 163374681.
7. Hoggarth JA, Ebert CE, Castelazo-Calva VE (2021). "MesoRAD: A New Radiocarbon Data Set for Archaeological Research in Mesoamerica". Journal of Open Archaeology Data. 9 (10): 1–9. doi:10.5334/joad.83. S2CID 245401909.
8. Inomata T, MacLellan J, Burham M (2015). "The Construction of Public and Domestic Spheres in the Preclassic Maya Lowlands". American Anthropologist. 117 (3): 519–534. doi:10.1111/aman.12285.
9. Inomata T, Triadan D, Lopez VA, Fernandez-Diaz JC, Omori T, Bauer MB, Hernandez MG, Beach T, Cagnato C, Aoyama K, Nasu H (25 June 2020). "Monumental architecture at Aguada Fenix and the rise of Maya civilization". Nature. 582 (7813): 530–533. Bibcode:2020Natur.582..530I. doi:10.1038/s41586-020-2343-4. PMID 32494009. S2CID 219281856.
10. Kennett DJ, Lipson M, Prufer KM, Mora-Marin D, George RJ, Rohland N, Robinson M, Trask WR, Edgar HH, Hill EC, Ray EE, Lynch P (22 March 2022). "South-to-north migration preceded the advent of intensive farming in the Maya region". Nature Communications. 13 (1): 1530. Bibcode:2022NatCo..13.1530K. doi:10.1038/s41467-022-29158-y. PMC 8940966. PMID 35318319.
11. Lesure RG, Sinensky RJ, Schachner G, Wake TA, Bishop KJ (2021). "Large-Scale Patterns in the Agricultural Demographic Transition of Mesoamerica and Southwestern North America". American Antiquity. 86 (3): 593–612. doi:10.1017/aaq.2021.23. S2CID 235538513.
12. Lohse JC, Awe JJ, Griffith C, Rosenswig RM, Valdez F (2006). "Preceramic Occupations in Belize: Updating the Paleoindian and Archaic Record". Latin American Antiquity. 17 (2): 209–226. doi:10.2307/25063047. JSTOR 25063047. S2CID 163373104.
13. Metcalfe SE, Holmes JA, Jones MD, Gonzalez RM, Primmer NJ, Dyrzo HM, Davies SJ, Leng MJ (15 April 2022). "Response of a low elevation carbonate lake in the Yucatan Peninsula (Mexico) to climatic and human forcings". Quaternary Science Reviews. 282: 1–17 of article no. 107445. Bibcode:2022QSRv..28207445M. doi:10.1016/j.quascirev.2022.107445. hdl:2160/60872eeb-b6f4-43ad-845f-e912dd25754a. S2CID 247514101.
14. Nielsen J, Andersen BJ (2004). "Collecting in Corozal : Late Postclassic Maya Effigy Censers from Belize in the Danish National Museum (1860-1865)". Mayab (17): 84–98. ISSN 1130-6157.
15. Pearson GA (3 July 2017). "Bridging the Gap: An Updated Overview of Clovis across Middle America and its Techno-Cultural Relation with Fluted Point Assemblages from South America". PaleoAmerica. 3 (3): 203–230. doi:10.1080/20555563.2017.1328953. S2CID 135101506.
16. Pendergast DM (March 1993). "The Center and the Edge: Archaeology in Belize, 1809–1992". Journal of World Prehistory. 7 (1): 1–33. doi:10.1007/BF00978219. JSTOR 25800626. S2CID 161362847.
17. Pollock AL, Beynen PE, DeLong KL, Polyak V, Asmerom Y, Reeder PP (1 December 2016). "A mid-Holocene paleoprecipitation record from Belize". Palaeogeography, Palaeoclimatology, Palaeoecology. 463: 103–111. Bibcode:2016PPP...463..103P. doi:10.1016/j.palaeo.2016.09.021.
18. Prufer KM, Alsgaard AV, Robinson M, Meredith CR, Culleton BJ, Dennehy T, Magee S, Huckell BB, Stemp WJ, Awe JJ, Capriles JM, Kennett DJ (18 July 2019). "Linking late paleoindian stone tool technologies and populations in North, Central and South America". PLOS ONE. 14 (7): 1–20 of article no. e0219812. Bibcode:2019PLoSO..1419812P. doi:10.1371/journal.pone.0219812. PMC 6638942. PMID 31318917.
19. Prufer KM, Robinson M, Kennett DJ (2021). "Terminal Pleistocene Through Middle Holocene Occupations in Southeastern Mesoamerica: Linking Ecology and Culture in the Context of Neotropical Foragers and Early Farmers". Ancient Mesoamerica. 32 (3): 439–460. doi:10.1017/S0956536121000195. S2CID 245125309.
20. Rice PM (24 March 2020). "In Search of Middle Preclassic Lowland Maya Ideologies". Journal of Archaeological Research. 29 (1): 1–46. doi:10.1007/s10814-020-09144-y. S2CID 216517189.
21. Schmitt D, Gischler E, Anselmetti FS, Vogel H (2020). "Caribbean cyclone activity: an annually-resolved Common Era record". Scientific Reports. 10 (1): 1–17 of article no. 11780. Bibcode:2020NatSR..1011780S. doi:10.1038/s41598-020-68633-8. PMC 7367345. PMID 32678192.
22. Stemp WJ, Awe JJ, Marcus J, Helmke C, Sullivan LA (2021). "The Preceramic and Early Ceramic Periods in Belize and the Central Maya Lowlands". Ancient Mesoamerica. 32 (3): 416–438. doi:10.1017/S0956536121000444. S2CID 245125311.
23. Valdez F, Sullivan LA, Buttles PJ, Aebersold L (2021). "The Origins and Identification of the Early Maya from Colha and Northern Belize". Ancient Mesoamerica. 32 (3): 502–518. doi:10.1017/S0956536121000468. S2CID 245125274.
24. Wallace C (May 2011). "Reconnecting Thomas Gann with British Interest in the Archaeology of Mesoamerica: An Aspect of the Development of Archaeology as a University Subject". Bulletin of the History of Archaeology. 21 (1): 23. doi:10.5334/bha.2113.

==== Theses ====
1. Awe JJ (1992). Dawn in the land between the rivers : formative occupation at Cahal Pech, Belize and its implications for Preclassic development in the Maya lowlands (PhD). University College London.
2. Bermingham A (2020). Land Use Strategies of the Ancient Maya in Seasonally Dry Tropical Forest Ecosystems of the Yucatan Peninsula (PhD). University of Northumbria.
3. Burns JM (2018). Preceramic Cave Use in Belize (MA). Northern Arizona University. ProQuest 2050579408.
4. Duncan LM (2019). Archaeological deposits, environmental impact and local soil formation at Marco Gonzalez, Belize (PhD). University College London.
5. Ebert CE (2017). Preclassic Maya Social Complexity and Origins of Inequality at Cahal Pech, Belize (PhD). Pennsylvania State University. ProQuest 2448339130.
6. Hoffmeister KK (2019). The Relationship between Sociopolitical Transitions and Mortuary Behavior among the Maya in Northern Belize (PhD). Texas A&M University. ISBN 9798438733836.
7. McLellan A (2020). From Lamanai to Ka'kabish : human and environment interaction, settlement change, and urbanism in northern Belize (PhD). University College London.
8. Moore T (2021). Creation During Abandonment: Researching the Hingston Group at Ka'Kabish, Belize (MA). Trent University. ProQuest 2477999560.
9. Orsini SR (2016). From turkeys to tamales: Paleoindian to Preclassic period faunal use at Maya Hak Cab Pek rockshelter in southern Belize (MA). University of Mississippi. ProQuest 1809807534.
10. Plumer H (2017). Health among the Maya : comparisons across sites in the northern Three Rivers Region, Belize (PhD). University of Sheffield.
11. Pring DC (1978). The Preclassic Ceramics of Northern Belize (PhD). University College London. EThOS ID uk.bl.ethos.469518.
12. Porter ML (2020). Caching Aggrandizers: Ritual Caching Practices, Competitive Generosity, and the Rise of Inequality in the Preclassic Maya Lowlands (MA). Northern Arizona University. ProQuest 2415270983.
13. Rawski ZJ (2020). Constructing Power in the Preclassic: Monumental Architecture and Sociopolitical Inequality at Early Xunantunich, Belize (PhD). University of Texas. ProQuest 2415765388.
14. Rushton EA (2014). 'Under the shade I flourish' : an environmental history of northern Belize over the last three thousand five hundred years (PhD). University of Nottingham.
15. Sparks-Stokes D (2019). The Impact of Ceramic Raw Materials on the Development of Hopewell and Preclassic Maya Pottery (PhD). University of Cincinnati. ProQuest 2272840805.

==== Print ====
1. Adams RE, Macleod MJ, eds. (2000a). Mesoamerica, Part 1. The Cambridge history of the native peoples of the Americas. Vol. 2. Cambridge: Cambridge University Press. doi:10.1017/CHOL9780521351652. ISBN 9781139053778. S2CID 163512332.
2. Adams RE, Macleod MJ, eds. (2000b). Mesoamerica, Part 2. The Cambridge history of the native peoples of the Americas. Vol. 2. Cambridge: Cambridge University Press. doi:10.1017/CHOL9780521652049. ISBN 9781139053464.
3. Henderson G (1809). An account of the British settlement of Honduras; being a view of its commercial and agricultural resources, soil, climate, natural history, &c. London: Printed by and for C. and R. Baldwin, New Bridge-Street. hdl:2027/uc1.31175035187452.
4. Henderson G (1811) [First published 1809]. An account of the British settlement of Honduras; being a view of its commercial and agricultural resources, soil, climate, natural history, &c. London: Printed for R. Baldwin, Paternoster Row.
5. Martin S (2020). Ancient Maya politics :a political anthropology of the classic period 150-900 CE. Cambridge: Cambridge University Press. doi:10.1017/9781108676694. ISBN 9781108676694. OCLC 1104073524. S2CID 243365082.
6. Martin S, Grube N (2008) [First published 2000]. Chronicle of the Maya kings and queens : deciphering the dynasties of the ancient Maya (2nd ed.). London & New York: Thames & Hudson. hdl:2027/uc1.32106019910212. OCLC 47358325.
7. Pearsall DM, ed. (2008). Encyclopedia of Archaeology. San Diego, Calif.: Elsevier. OCLC 714030453.
8. Sharer RJ, Traxler LP, eds. (2006). The Ancient Maya (6th ed.). Stanford, Calif.: Stanford University Press. hdl:2027/mdp.39015062626216. OCLC 57577446.
9. Tiesler V (2022). Tiesler V (ed.). The Routledge Handbook of Mesoamerican Bioarchaeology. London: Routledge. doi:10.4324/9780429341618. ISBN 9780429341618. S2CID 248676019.

==== Other ====
1. Witschey WR, Brown CT (2010). The Electronic Atlas of Ancient Maya Sites (Map). [vars. scales]. Corvallis, Oreg.: Heidi Hausman & Conservation Biology Institute.
