= Maya ruins of Belize =

Historically important pre-Columbian Maya archaeological sites

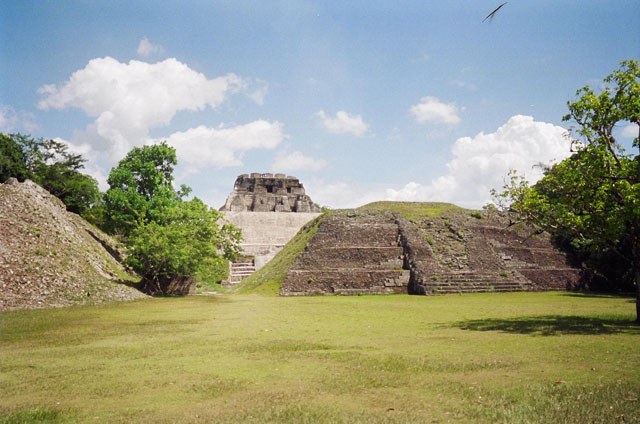
Maya ruins of Xunantunich

The Maya ruins of Belize include a number of well-known and historically important pre-Columbian Maya archaeological sites. Belize is considered part of the southern Maya lowlands of the Mesoamerican culture area, and the sites found there were occupied from the Preclassic (2000 BCE–200 CE) until and after the arrival of the Spanish in the 16th century.

Many sites are in danger due to destruction by construction companies, which frequently source road fill from the ancient ruins.

== Caracol ==
Historically the most important site, Caracol ('the snail' in Spanish), is located in western Belize, near the border with Guatemala and within the Chiquibul Forest Reserve. Caracol was the center of one of the largest Maya kingdoms and today contains the extant remains of thousands of structures. The city was an important player in the Classic period political struggles of the southern Maya lowlands, and is known for defeating and subjugating Tikal (while allied with Calakmul, located in Campeche, Mexico).

On July 10, 2025 archaeologists from the University of Houston discovered a 1,700 year old burial chamber at Caracol containing a rare mosaic death mask, jadeite ornaments, Pacific sea shells, and intricately decorated pottery and bone artifacts.

== Cerros ==
The site of Cerros, located on Corozal Bay in northern Belize, is notable as one of the earliest Maya sites, reaching its apogee during the Late Preclassic on Corozal Bay, and for the presence of an E-Group, a unique structural complex found in Maya architecture.

== Lamanai ==
Lamanai, located on the New River in Orange Walk District, is known for being the longest continually-occupied site in Mesoamerica. The initial settlement of Lamanai occurred during the Early Preclassic, and it was continuously occupied up to and through the colonization of the area. During the Spanish conquest of Yucatán, the conquistadores established a Roman Catholic church at Lamanai, but a revolt by the native Maya drove them away. The extant remains of the church are still standing today.

There are 3 Mayan temples in the Lamanai archaeological reserve: Mask Temple, High Temple and Temple of the Jaguar, along with ball courts. From a town of Tower Hill to the north, you take a boat along the New River to get to the site. Howler monkeys and boa constrictors have also been seen on the hiking trail to the temples.

== Other sites ==
The following is a list of other archaeological sites located within Belize:

- Actun Tunichil Muknal
- Altun Ha
- Baking Pot
- Barton Creek Cave
- Cahal Pech
- Caracol
- Cerros
- Chaa Creek
- Colha
- Cuello
- El Pilar
- Ka'Kabish
- K'axob
- La Milpa
- Lamanai
- Louisville
- Lubaantun
- Marco Gonzalez
- Minanha
- Nim Li Punit
- Nohmul
- Nohoch Che'en
- Pacbitun
- Pusilha
- San Estevan
- Santa Rita, Corozal
- Tipu
- Uxbenka
- Xnaheb
- Xunantunich
