= Archaic Period (Americas) =

Prehistoric period in the Americas

Several chronologies in the archaeology of the Americas include an Archaic Period or Archaic stage etc. It is often sub-divided, for example into "Early", "Middle" and "Late", or alternatively "Lower" and "Upper", stages. The dates, and the characteristics of the period called "Archaic" vary between different parts of the Americas. Sometimes also referred to as the "Pre-Ceramic stage" or period, it followed the Lithic stage and was superseded by the Formative stage, or a Preformative stage. The typical broad use of the terms is as follows:

- In Mesoamerican chronology the Archaic runs from about 3500 BC to 1800 BC; sites include Coxcatlan Cave, Tehuacán, showing the development of maize.
- In the periodization of pre-Columbian Peru the term may not be used, replaced by the Pre-Ceramic.
- In the Caribbean islands, the Archaic Age ranges from 6000 BC and 500 BC, when the earliest human settlements were established. These early settlers came from Central or South America.
- In the North American chronology the North American Archaic period runs from around 11,500 to 3200 cal yr B.P. and is usually subdivided into three subperiods: Early Archaic (11,500-8900 cal yr B.P.), Middle Archaic (8900-5800 cal yr B.P.), and Late Archaic (5800-3200 cal yr B.P.).

Cultures of the Archaic Stage are at some point in the development of the technologies of pottery, weaving, and developed food production; normally they are becoming reliant on agriculture, unless reliant on seafood. Social organization is developing into permanent villages. In the early parts of the period, hunting is gradually replaced by gathering, as the megafauna hunted in the Lithic stage decline. By the end of the Archaic, in parts of South America, there is "a stable agricultural system utilized by people living in permanent villages with ceremonial architecture".

The Archaic is the second of five stages defined by Gordon Willey and Philip Phillips in their 1958 book Method and Theory in American Archaeology.

1. The Lithic stage
2. The Archaic stage
3. The Formative stage
4. The Classic stage
5. The Post-Classic stage

== See also ==
- Archaic period (Belize)
