= San Estevan =

San Estevan may refer to:

- San Estevan (Maya site), an archaeological site located in northern Belize
- San Estevan, Belize, a village in Orange Walk District, Belize
