= Pre-Columbian Belize =

Belize prior to Spanish colonisation

Pre-Columbian era
- 20000 BC – 1500 AD
None	Columbian era
- Including: Preceramic; Preclassic; Classic; Postclassic
- Key events: Palaeoindian settlement; Mayan settlement; social, economic, technological, intellectual development

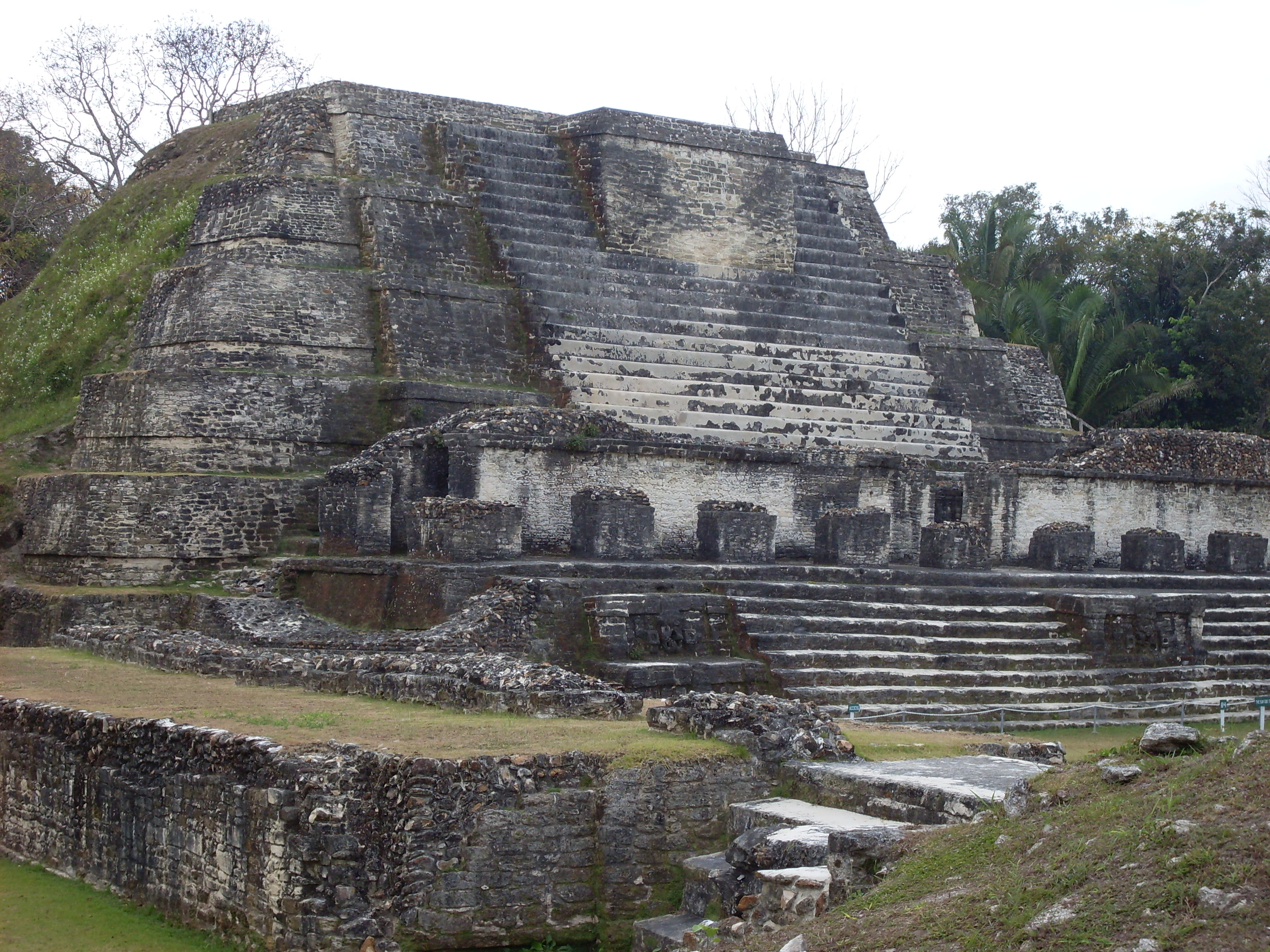
A Mayan temple at the Altun Ha site.

The Pre-Columbian Belize history is the period from initial indigenous presence, across millennia, to the first contacts with Europeans - the Pre-Columbian or before Columbus period - that occurred on the region of the Yucatán Peninsula that is present day Belize.

Belize's history begins with the Palaeoindians. They were nomadic people that arrived in the Asia to the Americas migration across the frozen Bering Strait, perhaps as early as 35,000 years ago. In the course of many millennia, their descendants settled in and adapted to different environments in the Americas, creating many cultures in North America, Central America, and South America. The Mayan culture emerged in the lowland area of the Yucatán Peninsula and the highlands to the south, in what is now southeastern Mexico, Guatemala, western Honduras, and Belize. Between about 2500 BC and AD 250, the basic institutions of Mayan civilization developed. The peak of this civilization occurred during the Classic Period, which began about AD 250.

Many aspects of this culture persist in the area despite nearly half a millennium of European presence. All evidence, whether from archaeology, history, ethnography, or linguistics, points to a cultural continuity in this region. The descendants of the first settlers in the area have lived there for at least three millennia.

== Archaic period (c. 8,000—2,500 BC) ==
During the late Archaic period (circa 3000 BC), some hunting and foraging bands settled in small farming villages along the coast of what is now Belize. While hunting and foraging continued to play a part in their subsistence, these farmers domesticated crops such as maize, beans, squash, and chili peppers, which are still the basic foods in Central America.

Farmers engaged in various types of agriculture, including labor-intensive irrigated and ridged-field systems and shifting slash-and-burn agriculture. Their products fed the civilization's craft specialists, merchants, warriors, and priest-astronomers, who coordinated agricultural and other seasonal activities with a cycle of rituals in ceremonial centers. These priests, who observed the movements of the sun, moon, planets, and stars, developed a complex mathematical and calendrical system to coordinate various cycles of time and to record specific events on carved stelae.

== Maya civilisation ==
=== Preclassic period (c. 2500 BC—250 AD) ===
During the Preclassic period, the settlements along the coast grew and spread west into the interior.

Emerging information from western Belize suggests that ceramic-using populations may have been in place as early as ca. 1200 B.C. at Cahal Pech and perhaps elsewhere (Awe 1992; Clark and Cheetham 2002; Garber et al. 2004; Healy and Awe 1995). While these complexes, termed "Cunil" at Cahal Pech and "Kanocha" at Blackman Eddy, remain to be broadly documented across the Belize River Valley, they are the earliest established ceramic technologies recorded in western Belize.

At the northern sites, the pottery is now believed to have come somewhat later.

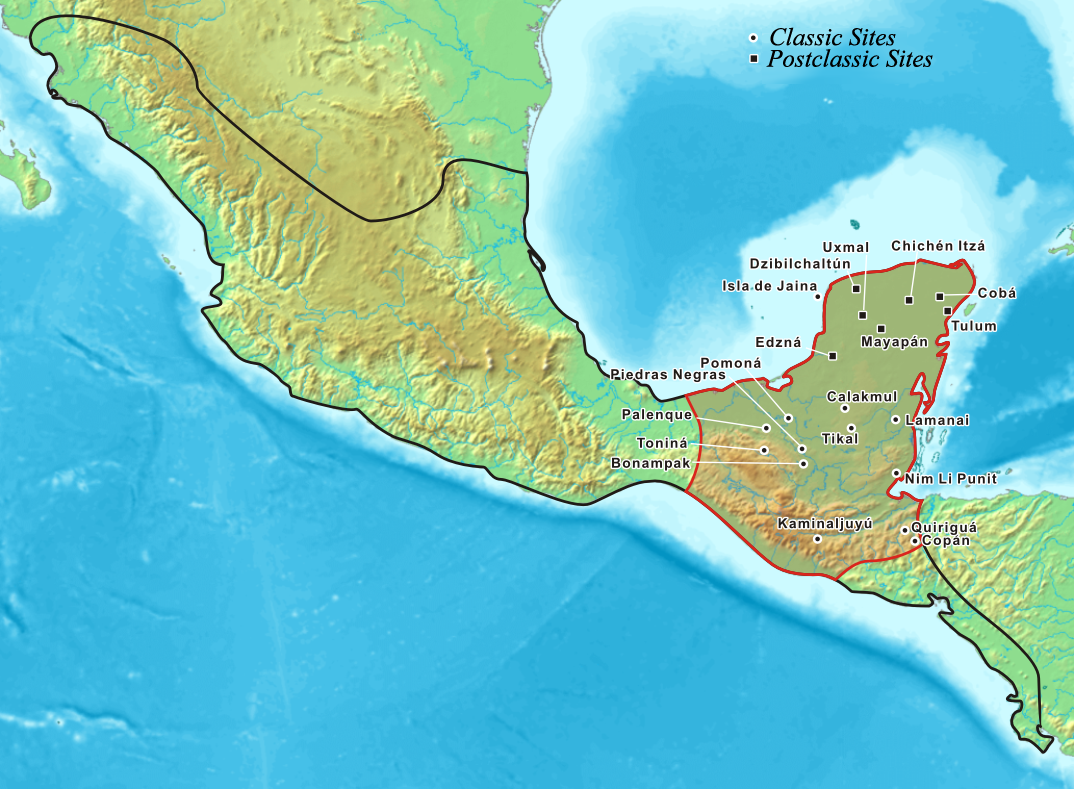
The extent of the Maya civilization domain in Mesoamerica.

At the Cuello site, from perhaps as early as 1000 BC, jars, bowls, and other dishes found there are among the oldest pottery unearthed in Mesoamerica. The site, five kilometers west of Orange Walk, includes platforms of buildings arranged around a small plaza, indicating a distinctly Mayan community. The presence of shell, hematite, and jade shows that the Maya were trading over long distances as early as 1500 BC. The Mayan economy, however, was still basically subsistence, combining foraging and cultivation, hunting, and fishing.

Cerros, a site on Chetumal Bay, was a flourishing trade and ceremonial centre between about 300 BC and AD 100. It displays some distinguishing features of early Mayan civilisation. The architecture of Mayan civilisation included temples and palatial residences organised in groups around plazas. These structures were built of cut stone, covered with stucco, and elaborately decorated and painted.

Stylised carvings and paintings of people, animals, and gods, along with sculptured stelae and geometric patterns on buildings, constitute a highly developed style of art. Impressive six-feet-high masks decorate the temple platform at Cerros. These masks, situated on either side of the central stairway, represent a serpent god.

=== Classic period (c. 250—900 AD) ===
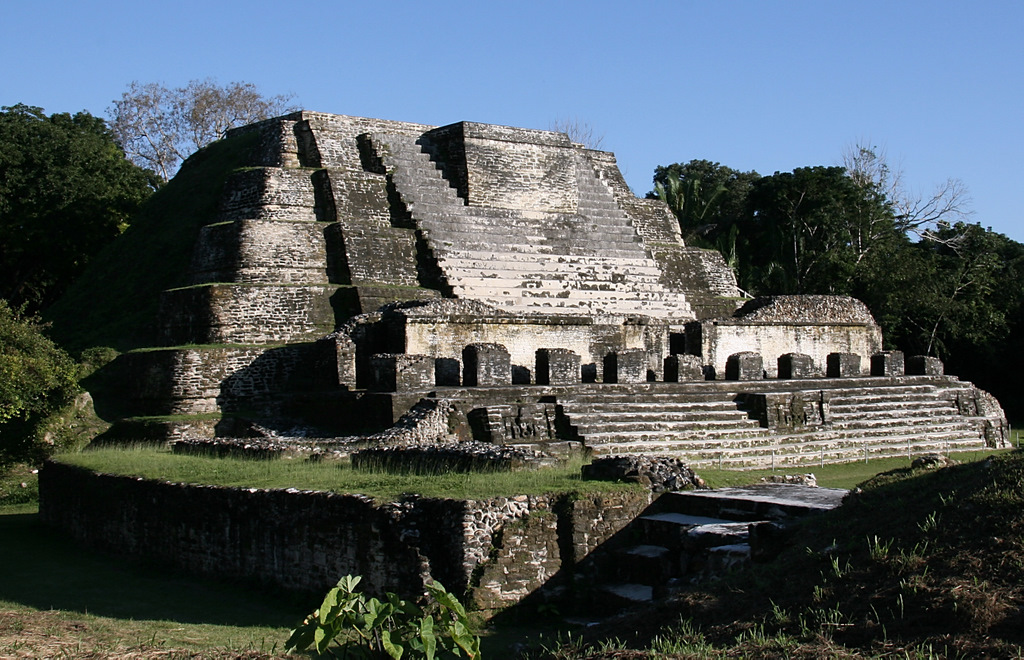
The 'Temple of the Masonry Altars' at Mayan Altun Ha.

==== Altún Ha ====
The Maya were skilled at making pottery, carving jade, knapping flint, and making elaborate costumes of feathers. One of the largest carved jade objects of Mayan civilisation was found in a tomb at the classic period site of Altun Ha, thirty kilometers northwest of present-day Belize City. Usually stated to be the head of the sun god, Kinich Ahau, it is actually quite unlike this deity, save for the square and squinting eyes. Settled at least as early as 200 BC, the Altún Ha area at its peak had an estimated 8,000 to 10,000 inhabitants.

At the beginning of the second century AD, the inhabitants built their first major structure, a temple. The visitor today sees a group of temples, priests' residences, and other buildings around two adjacent plazas. In the vicinity, there are hundreds of other structures, most of which are still unexcavated. The Maya continued to rebuild some of the temples until almost the end of the ninth century.

Excavations at Altun Ha have produced evidence suggesting that a revolt, perhaps of peasants against the priestly class, contributed to the downfall of the civilisation. People may have continued to live at or to visit the site in the postclassic period, even though the ceremonial centres were left to decay. Some rubbish found at Altún Ha shows that people were at the site in the thirteenth and fourteenth centuries, perhaps to reuse the old structures or undertake pilgrimages to the old religious centre.

The recorded history of the centre and south is dominated by Caracol, where the inscriptions on their monuments was, as elsewhere, in the Lowland Maya aristocratic tongue Classic Ch'olti'an. North of the Maya Mountains, the inscriptional language at Lamanai on Hill Bank Lagoon in Orange Walk District was Yucatecan as of 625 CE. Other Mayan centres located in Belize include Xunantunich and Baking Pot in Cayo District, Lubaantún and Nimli Punit in Toledo District.

==== Xunantunich ====
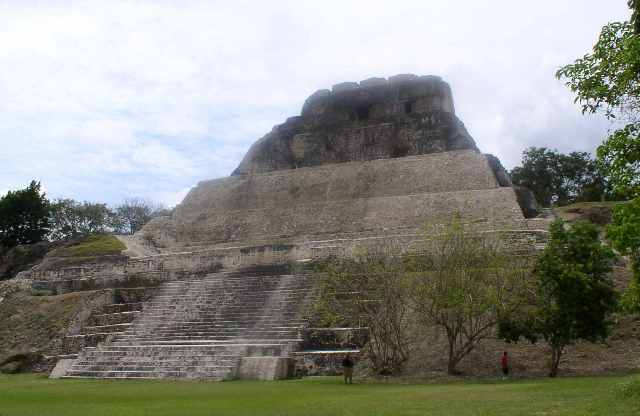
A Mayan temple 'pyramid' at Xunantunich, in Cayo District, Belize.

Xunantunich, meaning "Lady of the Rock," was occupied perhaps as early as 300 BC, but most of the architecture there was constructed in the late classic period. As in all the lowland Mayan centres, the inhabitants continually constructed temples and residences over older buildings, enlarging and raising the platforms and structures in the process. The views are breathtaking from Xunantunich's "El Castillo," which, at 128 feet, is one of the tallest man-made structures in Belize. Canaa (Sky Palace), located at Caracol, measures 140 feet and is Belize's highest man-made structure.

Lamanai, less accessible to tourists than Altun Ha or Xunantunich, is an important site because it provides archaeological evidence of the Mayan presence over many centuries, beginning around AD 150. Substantial populations were present throughout the classic and postclassic periods. Indeed, people living in the area were still refacing some of the massive ceremonial buildings after the great centres, such as Tikal in neighbouring Guatemala, had been virtually abandoned in the tenth century.

==== Late classic period ====
In the late classic period, it is estimated that between 400,000 and 1,000,000 people inhabited the area that is now Belize. People settled almost every part of the country worth cultivating, as well as the cayes and coastal swamp regions.

=== Postclassic period (c. 10th—early 16th century) ===
In the tenth century, Mayan society suffered a severe breakdown. Construction of public buildings ceased, the administrative centres lost power, and the population declined as social and economic systems lost their coherence. Some people continued to occupy, or perhaps reoccupied, sites such as Altun Ha, Xunantunich, and Lamanai, but these sites ceased being splendid ceremonial and civic centres.

At the end of the postclassic period, the area that is now Belize included three distinct Maya territories: Chetumal Province, which encompassed the area around Corozal Bay; Dzuluinicob Province, which encompassed the area between the lower New River and the Sibun River, west to Tipu; and a southern territory controlled by the Manche Ch'ol Maya, encompassing the area between the Monkey River and the Sarstoon River.

== See also ==
- Mesoamerican chronology
- Maya ruins of Belize
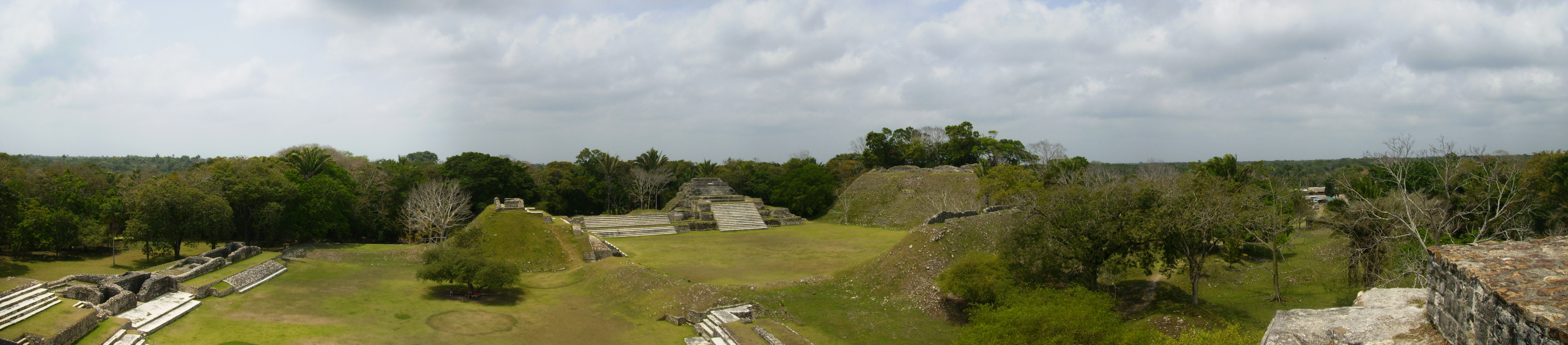
An overlook of the Altun Ha Maya site in the Belize District, Belize.

== Readings ==
- Zeitlin, Robert N. (1984). "A Summary Report on Three Seasons of Field Investigations into the Archaic Period Prehistory of Lowland Belize". American Anthropologist. 86 (2): 358–369. doi:10.1525/aa.1984.86.2.02a00110. ISSN 0002-7294.
- Wilson, Samuel M.; Iceland, Harry B.; Hester, Thomas R. (1998). "Preceramic Connections between Yucatan and the Caribbean". Latin American Antiquity. 9 (4): 342. doi:10.2307/3537032. ISSN 1045-6635. JSTOR 3537032. S2CID 163718303.
- Rosenswig, Robert M.; Pearsall, Deborah M.; Masson, Marilyn A.; Culleton, Brendan J.; Kennett, Douglas J. (2014). "Archaic period settlement and subsistence in the Maya lowlands: new starch grain and lithic data from Freshwater Creek, Belize". Journal of Archaeological Science. 41: 308–321. Bibcode:2014JArSc..41..308R. doi:10.1016/j.jas.2013.07.034. ISSN 0305-4403.
