= Mesoamerican Classic period =

Historical period of Mesoamerica, 200–950 CE

Classic
- 250–900
Preclassic	Postclassic
- Location: Mesoamerica
- Including: Epiclassic
- Key events: Rise of Teotihuacan; agricultural, social, economic development

Location of Mesoamerica on the continent

The Mesoamerican Classic period is marked by the consolidation of the urban process that started in the Late Preclassic and later the Postclassic, which occurred until the third century A.D. During the first part of this era, Mesoamerica was dominated by Teotihuacan. Beginning in the fourth century A. D., this city experienced a major process of decay that allowed the growth of the Maya, Zapotec, and central regional cultures of the Epiclassic.

== General characteristics ==
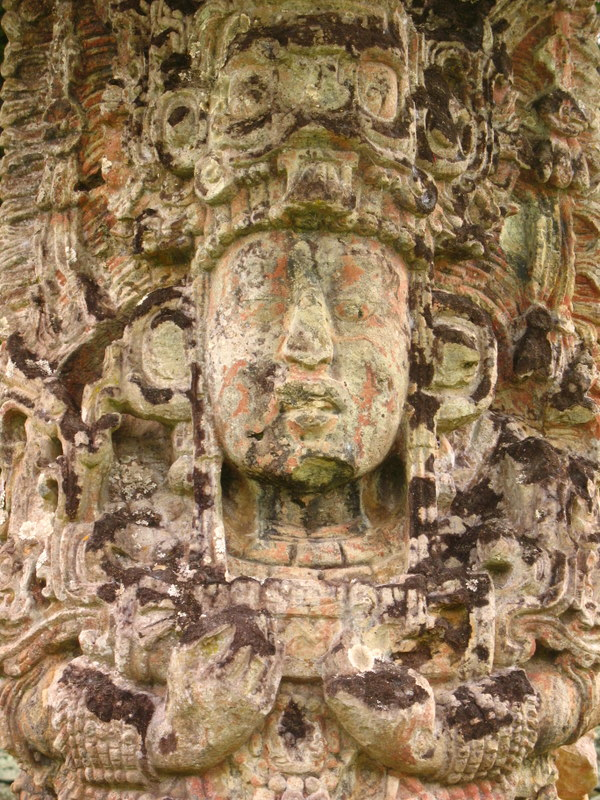
Maya stele in Copán.

The Mesoamerican Classic Period can be established from around 200 to 900 A. D. However, the chronology varies in each cultural area. The precursors to this period are found in the late Preclassic Period, at around 400 B. C, when an increase in efficiency of agriculture technology led to demographic growth, a greater division of labor and specialization, and the growth of trade. The technological changes that made it possible were conditioned by specific factors in each region. Maya, Zapotecs, and Teotihuacans started to implement techniques such as irrigation systems. The staple crop continued to be maize.

In the same period, a bifurcation of traditions took place: One in central Mexico and the other in northern Mayan cities. Such differentiation is visible on all central ruins in the Mesoamerican complex, such as the calendar and writing systems. This were taken to their maximum complexity in the Maya civilization.

Far from what was thought in early texts about the Classic Period, today it is known that, in central Mexico as well as Maya states were warring cultures, although never to the extent of the cultures of the Postclassic. War seems to be central subject in the history of the Maya, revealed by steles of the era and the iconographic representations that have been discovered in sites like Toniná. In that region, various city-states established themselves that were often hostile to each other. For their part, Teotihuacan could not have become the great political and economic center they were without the use of force, also attested by the iconography of the city; However, it seems that the sheer size of Teotihuacan power freed the city from the hostilities of other competing states. Similarly, Monte Albán prevailed in the central valleys of Oaxaca through war, according to the steles found in Building J of the city.

Trade played an important role as an element of cohesion between Mesoamericans. Teotihuacan has an important role as a trading hub. After its collapse, the trade network decayed as well, after which smaller regional centers rose to prominence. Another of the principle subjects of the Classic was urbanism. The cities were carefully planned and constructed. The cities, in addition to being administrative and religious centers, functioned as productive commercial nodes.

As a last point, it is necessary to emphasize that most of the deities of the Mesoamerican pantheon were 'crystallized' in the classic period, and that religion occupied an important place in the social structure as an auxiliary of political power. Presumably, the clergy monopolized the knowledge of astronomy, mathematics, writing and even commerce and politics. There are sculpted and painted Maya texts, which have been identified as chronological, astronomical and historical, although they are not the main source of knowledge about the Maya, since they are written in their complex Maya script, which is still in the process of being deciphered. The Classic period, from 200 to 900, is characterized by a remarkable cultural flourishing. Even in Southern Mexico, Maya civilizations demonstrate advanced agriculture practices and a history of water management. For instance, in a recent study, scientists using Lidar discovered evidence of Maya quarrying alongside the extraction of natural resources at the Yaxnohcah site on the Guatemalen border. The limestone might be used to make building materials, decoration, and weapons. Locals were able to remove limestone from the ground throughout the classical period, but this left holes in the ground. Since historians traditionally thought that elites controlled all water management, the Mayans intentional reuse of these spaces to preserve water and capture it for themselves highlights the understanding of the different ways groups have access to controlling water.

Again, in the late classic period, another archaeological site, called Xunantunich, had growing numbers of trades and alliances. Held common areas for elites and is an example of demonstrating archaeological structures since it includes temples and pyramids from the Maya civilization.

However, the chronology varies in each cultural area. In the same classic period there was also a bifurcation of traditions in the Mesoamerican area: one, headed by Estereotipan, and the other by the Maya cities of the north.

== Central Mexico: Teotihuacan ==
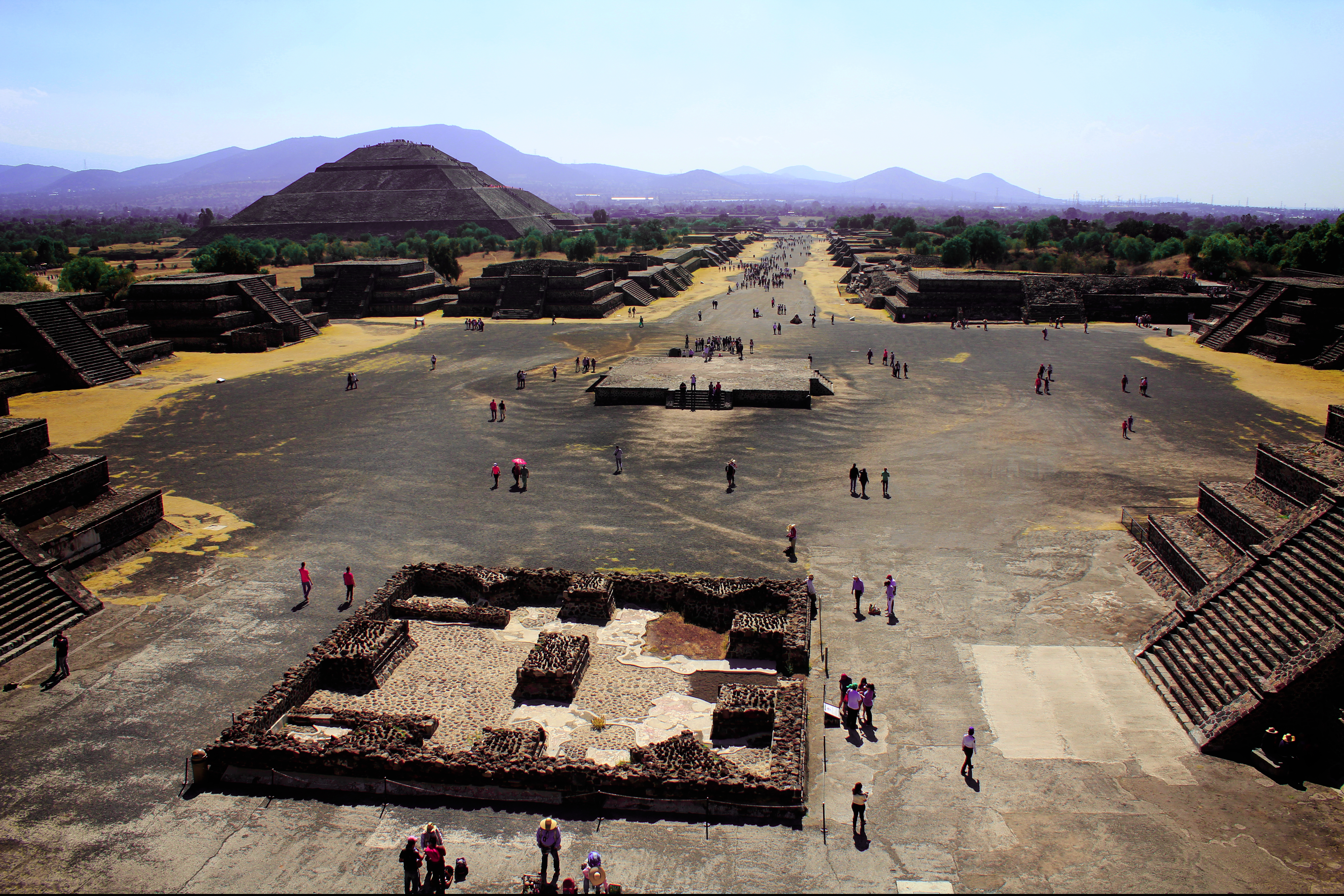
Ceremonial complex of Teotihuacán

Teotihuacan was "the Mesoamerican city par excellence". Its origins date to the late preclassic. Possibly, after the eruption of Xitle and with the decline of Cuicuilco, Teotihuacan came to house 75% of the population of the Mexican Basin in this era. The development of Teotihuacan was supported, among other things, by the exploitation of natural resources found in its location and its strategic geographic position intersection various trade routes.

The Teotihuacan chronology can be divided into six eras:

- Miccaelixis (150–250 A. D.): Commercial expansion. Construction of the Avenue of the Dead, the Citadel, and the Temple of Quetzalcóatl.
- Tlamimilolpa (250–400): Population increase. Construction of the Pyramid of the Moon, Temple of the Feathered Serpent. Founding of the Oaxacan Quarter. Teotihuacan presence in Monte Albán and Kaminaljuyú. Trade of obsidian and Thin Orange ceramics.
- Xolalpan (400-550): Peak of population. 125 thousand inhabitants.
- Metepec (550-650): Decline of the city. 85 thousand inhabitants. Fire and drought. Loss of Mesoamerican dominance.
- Oxtotípac y Xometla (650-850): Teotihuacan stays prominent in highlands.

The changes in the settlement model in the Center made possible the emergence of the rural/urban dichotomy. An interesting point derived from this dyad is the reason for the high population concentration and the way in which the city provided itself with food. It is assumed that Teotihuacán must have had agricultural techniques that would allow it to satisfy the demand of its enormous population. It has been proposed that among them were the cultivation of chinampas in the swamps of the San Juan (Sanders), the construction of terraces, fallow land, and the occupation of an important part of the city's residents in agriculture. In any case, it is almost certain that they depended extensively on rainfed crops, and that their diet of maize, squash, beans and chili was supplemented by hunting, gathering and fishing.

Other important economic activities of the Teotihuacanos were craft production (pottery objects and obsidian manufactures) and long-distance trade. In both cases, there was an important specialization and, due to the demand, it became necessary to modify techniques to mass-produce (for example, through the use of molds and modeling without a potter's wheel in the case of pottery).

Two outstanding artistic expressions in Teotihuacan were sculpture and architecture. Both had a public and monumental character. Sculpture was geometric in style, and generally represented animals and deities associated with water and fertility. The architecture also had its peculiar features, the most important of which was the use of talud-tablero modules, widely used at the time.

Writing, mathematics, astronomy and the calendar were never developed to the level of their Maya contemporaries. It is assumed that this is due to certain internal characteristics of the Teotihuacan political system, that is: it did not need a greater complexity in these technologies and knowledge.

Regarding its social organization, researchers have proposed that the city was divided into neighborhoods by lineages or by corporations with specific occupations. What is certain is that its power could not be based on the kinship structure, and that it was a multi-ethnic city. So far, it is not possible to establish which was the majority group; it is speculated that they could have been Oto-Manguean, Popoluca or Nahua-speaking peoples.

== Oaxaca ==
=== Mixteca Alta (Las Flores phase) ===
Unlike what happened in the Valley, the Mixtec did not have a hegemonic capital in the Classic. However, there was a considerable increase in the number of localities compared to the Preclassic. These were relatively small nuclei, of which Yucuñudahui was the largest. Yucuñudahui has a complex urban planning, which follows an L-shaped pattern. In this settlement, religious buildings, palaces, plazas, ball games and tombs were erected in the style of the Zapotecs of Monte Albán.

=== Central Valley (Monte Albán) ===
The more than one thousand Classic sites found in the Central Valleys of Oaxaca were evidently under the control of the entire Monte Albán. The Classic history of Monte Albán is usually divided into two periods:

- Monte Albán IIIA (A.D. 250–600): strong ties with Teotihuacán, probably peaceful in nature.
- Monte Albán IIIB-IV (600–800/900): Maximum population of the city. Diminishing contacts with Central Mexico. The decline of the city is gradual, and begins around the year 750, for still undetermined causes.

This city is built on a hill 400 m above the level of the valley. At its peak it had a population of 15,000–30,000 inhabitants, who occupied more than two thousand terraces on the slopes of the hill. The city was subdivided into 15 large neighborhoods, which corresponded either to an equal number of lineages or to incorporated groups of economic activities.

Monte Alban had a Great Plaza, surrounded by civil and religious buildings. Its main characteristic follows the Teotihuacan talud/tablero model, with a peculiarity typical of the region: the 'double scapular' board. The large plaza could hold up to 15,000 people. It also houses a good number of tombs, of which the most important are 103,104 and 105. The offerings found were composed of shell ornaments, green stone, and above all, the famous gray ceramic urns (masterpieces of classic Zapotec art), which usually contained nothing more than some beads, shell objects or were found empty.

The number of monuments with inscriptions that have been found in the valley of Oaxaca is only surpassed by the Maya area. These monuments reveal a mixed writing, similar to Maya and Olmec, with a syntactic order. The inscriptions deal with historical themes (births, conquests, etc.).

Altogether, from Teotihucan, Monte Alban, Yaxnohcah, Xunantunich, and many more, these Mayan sites help us recognize important contributions made in the classic period. The diverse structures found in different parts of Mexico add to our understanding of cultures and development.

== Gulf Coast ==
During the classic period, the Gulf coast region was home to the Classic Veracruz culture.

== West ==
In the west it is not possible to establish a clear division between the Preclassic and Classic, due to the fact that the level of the complexity in the area's cultures does not permit it. During the Classic period, the west had little relations with the rest of Mesoamerica, except in the Guerrero area, home to the Mezcala culture, which we know of due to its carved stone objects.

In all of the Maya region, numerous human settlements, ceremonial and political centers, administrative buildings, and cultural buildings were built. Drainage systems and potable water systems were also built. There are many houses showing the different social strata, markets, squares and other buildings, revealing a well-organized religious and civil power structure.

== See also ==
Elsewhere

- Classic period in North America
- Classic period in Belize

Other

- Pre-Columbian era
- Mesoamerican chronology
