= William Bullard =

William Bullard may refer to:

- William H. G. Bullard (1866–1927), United States Navy admiral
- William Bullard (Dedham) (1594–1686), early resident in Dedham, Massachusetts
- William R. Bullard (1926–1972), American archaeologist
- Bill Bullard Jr. (1943–2020), Michigan politician
