= Speculative Period =

Term describing archaeological methods in the early days of North American archaeology

The Speculative Period (1492a.-1840a.) was a term created by Gordon Willey and Sabloff (1993:12-37) to describe the archaeological methods and approaches employed in North America at the time. All the data during this time was based mainly on the notes from accounts from explorers and missionaries. It was very primitive compared with modern archaeological methods. A major problem with using the accounts from explorers and missionaries in North America was how they labeled the Native Americans as one group because of the lack of visual physical differences.

== Bibliography ==
- Pauketat, Timothy R., DiPaolo Loren, D (eds), North American Archaeology, Blackwell Publishing, MA. 2005
