= Formative stage =

Prehistoric period in the Americas

Several chronologies in the archaeology of the Americas include a Formative Period or Formative stage etc. It is often sub-divided, for example into "Early", "Middle" and "Late" stages.

The Formative is the third of five stages defined by Gordon Willey and Philip Phillips in their 1958 book Method and Theory in American Archaeology. Cultures of the Formative Stage are supposed to possess the technologies of pottery, weaving, and developed food production; normally they are very largely reliant on agriculture. Social organization is supposed to involve permanent towns and villages, as well as the first ceremonial centers. Ideologically, an early priestly class or theocracy is often present or in development.

Sometimes also referred to as the "Pre-Classic stage", it followed the Archaic stage and was superseded by the Classic stage.

1. The Lithic stage
2. The Archaic stage
3. The Formative stage
4. The Classic stage
5. The Post-Classic stage

The dates, and the characteristics of the period called "Formative" vary considerably between different parts of the Americas. The typical broad use of the terms is as follows below.

== Mesoamerica ==
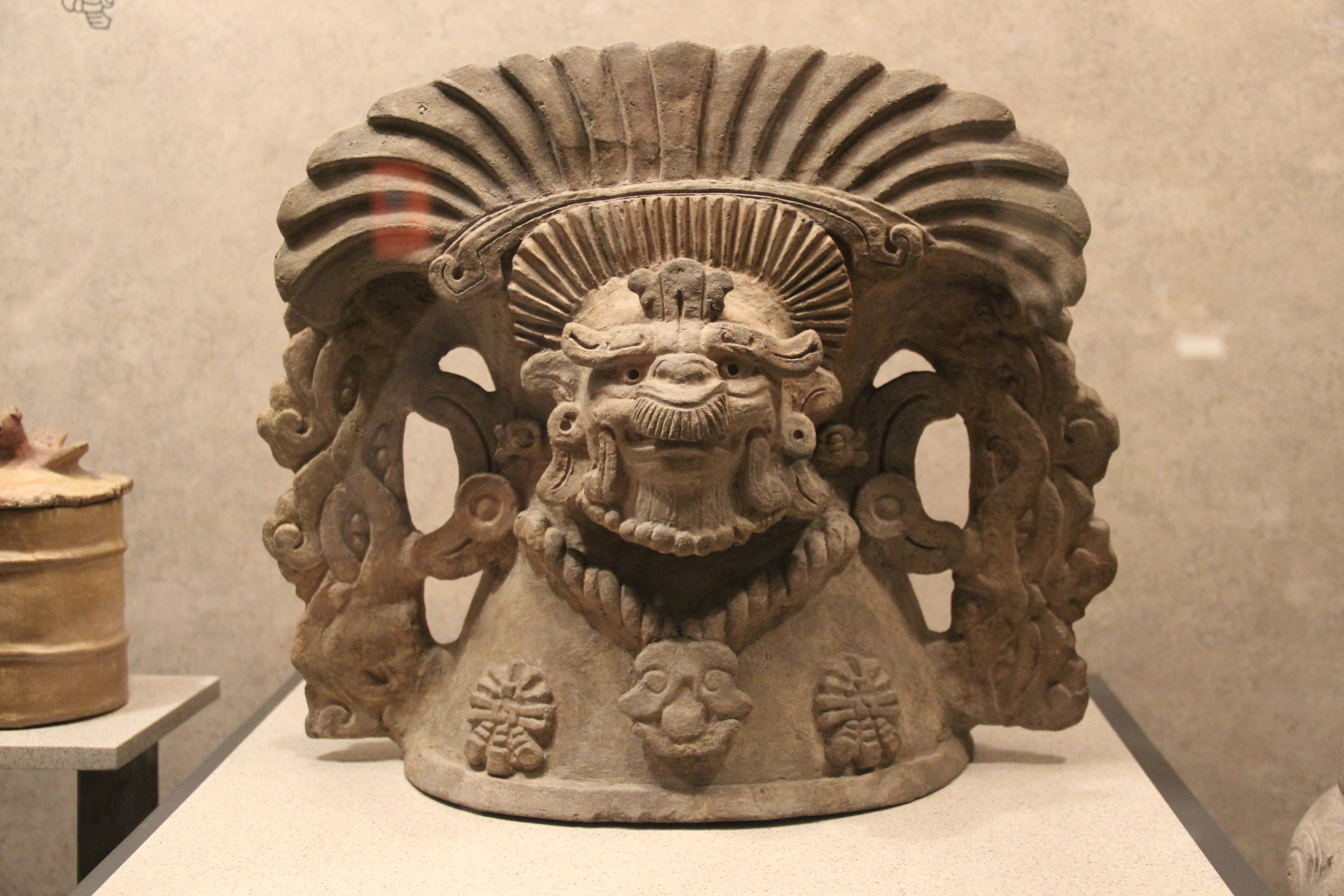
Zapotec art.

In Mesoamerican chronology the Preclassic or Formative runs from about 2000 BC to 250 AD, covering all the Olmec culture, and the early stages of the Maya culture and Zapotec civilization.

== North America Outside of Mesoamerica ==
In North American archaeological chronology outside of Mesoamerica, the term Archaic is in common use, but not the later Formative and Classic terminology. Local chronologies are favored instead. However, in the original Willey and Phillips classification, all of the complex societies of the pre-Contact United States were considered Formative cultures, including the more large-scale Woodland societies like the Hopewell Tradition and their descendants the Mississippian culture, as well as the Ancestral Puebloans and related cultures of the Southwest Oasisamerica.

The Formative, Classic and post-Classic stages are sometimes incorporated together as the Post-archaic period, which runs from 1000 BC to the present.

== South America ==
In the periodization of pre-Columbian Peru the Formative Period divides into 1) the Initial Period, from 1800 BC – 900 BC (sites & cultures: Early Chiripa, Kotosh culture, Cupisnique, Las Haldas, Sechin Alto), and 2) the Early Horizon or Formative Period, 900 BC – 200 BC, (Chavín, Late Chiripa, Paracas, Chankillo).

== See also ==
Elsewhere

- Formative period in Belize

Other

- Category:Archaeology in the Americas
- Mound Builders
- Southeastern Ceremonial Complex
