= Mesoamerican Postclassic period =

Historic period

Postclassic
- 900–1521
Classic	Colonial
- Location: Mesoamerica
- Including: Early; Late
- Key events: Socio-economic development; demographic flight

Maya pyramid in Chichen Itza, representative of the early Postclassic period (800-1100 C.E.)

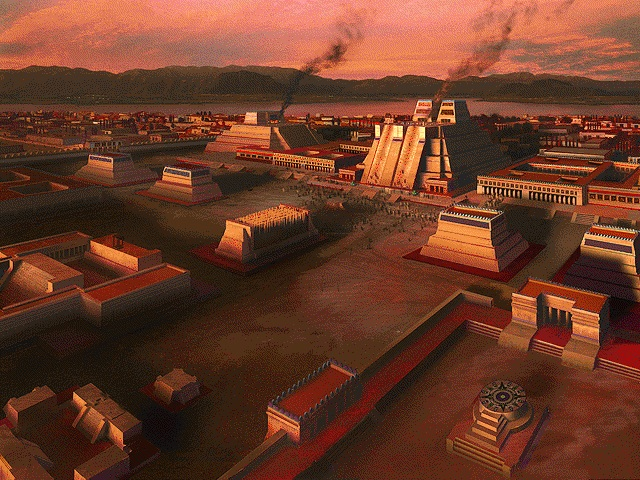
Tenochtitlan

The Mesoamerican Postclassic period was the last period of independent development of Mesoamerican civilization. It approximately refers to the last six centuries preceding Spanish colonization; that is, 900 to 1521 CE. It is characterized by urbanization and commercial activity, and is generally subdivided into the early postclassic (900-1200 CE) and the late postclassic (1200-1521 CE).

It culminated with the abandonment of the large cities or "metropoli", like Monte Albán in Oaxaca and the Maya cities of the highlands. Northern Mesoamerica was plagued by ecological disaster caused by prolonged draughts, leading the abandonment of the region. In light of these events, migrations were a phenomenon that marked the beginning of the Postclassic period, occurring between the eighth and tenth centuries.

The end of the Postclassic coincided with the arrival of the Spaniards in the second decade of the sixteenth century. Spanish colonization caused a process of transculturation that remodeled the indigenous cultures of the region and gave rise to the mestizo cultures of Mexico and Central America.

In the past, the Postclassic was often presented as a period dominated by warlike states, in contrast to the pacifist states of the Classic. New interpretations of archeological evidence from various Classic civilizations, namely Teotihuacan and the Maya, show that war was also an important activity within these societies. Maya society, which was thought of as a nation governed by priests engaged in intellectual pursuits, most likely also engaged in warlike activities.

The Postclassic was the era which gave rise to societies like the Mexica and Toltec in Central Mesoamerica, the Mixtec in Oaxaca, the Tarasca culture in the West, the Huastec in the plains of the Gulf of Mexico, and the Maya in the Yucatán Peninsula.

== Characteristics of Postclassic civilizations ==
Postclassic civilizations had some characteristics that differentiated them from their predecessors. These civilizations had militaristic, theocratic governments, in which the leader was simultaneously the head priest and military leader, since war during the Postclassic had become economically advantageous to these societies, which received tributes of corn, pumpkin, chili, and beans from polities they had defeated in battle. In the cultural sphere, many peoples had adapted their gods to their way of life, giving rise to gods who represented human practices, including Huītzilōpōchtli, the god of war. Economies continued to be based on seasonal agriculture, but long-distance trade also appeared in important markets like Potonchán in the gulf, where products were imported from the Yucatán Peninsula, the Mexican Plateau, the Guatemalan Highlands, and Soconusco. These included goods like cacoa beans, quetzal feathers, and jade. Some settlements on river and lake banks developed systems of irrigation that resulted in better agricultural outcomes. Additional, some regions with lower humidity developed hydraulic systems to better utilize their limited aquatic resources. For example, Tetzcuco constructed aqueducts that brought water from the springs of the Sierra Nevada to both the population and to Acolhua agricultural lands. Similar developments occurred in Loma de la Coyotera, an excavation site in the Tehuacán-Cuicatlán Biosphere Reserve. The Maya developed a system of cysterns dug into the bedrock, called chultuns, that collected rain water for irrigation and consumption.

The two dominant societies of this era were the Aztecs and the Maya (notably the League of Mayapan and the Kʼicheʼ kingdom of Qʼumarkaj). However, other prominent cultures included the Toltec, Mixtec, Huastec, Purépecha, Zapotec, Totonac and Pipil.

== Extended Postclassic ==
The term "extended Postclassic" refers to the historical phase during the first years of colonization of Mesoamerica by the Spanish. This concept is used to highlight the continuity of certain cultural, social, and material elemenents of the prehispanic civilizations during the process of colonization and in early colonial life, and to counter the idea of an abrupt "end of Mesoamerica" after colonization. The researcher María Elena Ruiz Aguilar, for example, has noted the importance of researching the continuity of Mesoamerican society during colonization.

The Mesoamerican Postclassic, traditionally defined as the period between 900 and 1521 C. E., culminated with the arrival of the Spanish and the fall of Tenochtitlan.

However, the concept of an "extended Postclassic" suggests that many aspects of prehispanic life didn't end abruptly with the European invasion. Instead, many cultural elements endured and adapted to the new conditions of colonial rule.

During the early colonial period, there continued to be significant use of indigenous objects and technologies. The weapons of the indigenous people also played a crucial role. Despite restrictions imposed by colonial authorities, many continued using indigenous weaponry, like bows and arrows, as well as adapting European technologies. Historic documents and archeological studies have shown that the indigenous civilizations allied with the Spanish, known as "friendly Indians", used their own weaponry in military campaigns. These groups were usually armed with bows, arrows, and escaupiles (padded cotton armor), although they sometimes used European weapons and horses.

The study of indigenous weaponry in the colonial period has faced various challenges due to the scarcity of detailed accounts and the difficulty of identifying specific archeological contexts that differentiate between the use of weaponry for war and other uses, such as hunting. However, the evidence suggests that indigenous weaponry did not just continue being used, but also adapted to the new circumstances of colonization. The "Extended Postclassic" offers a label to understand the persistence of Mesoamerican cultural practices outside of colonization, highlighting the importance of considering continuity and cultural adaptation in the history of Mesoamerica.

== See also ==
Elsewhere

- Postclassic period in North America
- Postclassic period in Belize

Other

- Mesoamerican chronology
- Mesoamerican Preclassic Period
- Mesoamerican Classic Period

== Bibliography ==
- Rojas, T (2008). "Las obras hidráulicas mesoamericanas en la transición novohispana". XIII Economy History Congress, Session. 17.
- Aguilar, M. E. R. (1994). La sobrevivencia de armas tradicionales nativas en la colonia, en una prohibición guatemalteca de que los indígenas porten armas, 1791. In Anales de antropología (Vol. 31).
- Peraza, Z., & Lorelei, R. (1989). Los chultunes sistemas de captación y almacenamiento de agua pluvial.
- Austin, A. L., & Luján, L. L. (2002). La periodización de la historia mesoamericana. Arqueología mexicana, (11), 14–23.
- Stahle, D. W., Diaz, J. V., Burnette, D. J., Paredes, J. C., Heim Jr, R. R., Fye, F. K., ... & Stahle, D. K. (2011). Major Mesoamerican droughts of the past millennium. Geophysical Research Letters, 38(5).
- Gibson, Charles (1981). Los aztecas bajo el dominio español 1519-1810. Mexico: Siglo XXI. ISBN 9682301440.
