= William R. Bullard =

American archaeologist

- Born: 4 June 1926; Boston, Massachusetts
- Died: 23 May 1972 (aged 45); Dartmouth, Massachusetts
- Education: Harvard University
- Scientific career
- Fields: archaeologist scholar

William Rotch Bullard Jr (June 4, 1926 – May 23, 1972) was an American archaeologist.

== Biography ==
He received an AB and a Ph.D from Harvard University

== Work ==
In the 1960s, William Bullard mapped San Estevan, a Mayan site located in Belize.
