= San Estevan, Belize =

San Estevan
- Location within Belize
- Coordinates: 18°09′18″N 88°30′38″W
- Country: Belize
- District: Orange Walk District

Population (2000)
  - Total: 1,573
- Time zone: UTC-6 (Central)
- Climate: Aw

San Estevan was the first town in the Orange Walk District of the nation of Belize. It later due to the migration of villagers to other parts of the country during a great epidemic. According to the 2010 census, it had a population of 1,573 people. The village is approximately 6 miles northeast from Orange Walk Town.

Most villagers rely on sugarcane as a source of income; San Estevan is surrounded by thousands of acres of cane plantations, and as much as 90% of villagers own parcels of sugar cane and are active cane farmers. The village is the number one producer of sugar cane in the two divisions of Corozal and Orange Walk. The New River passes through the left side of the village and the river is still used for transportation of sugar through barges up to Belize City, where it is sent abroad. Sugarcane is cultivated all year long and harvested from November to June. Cane is delivered to BSI (Belize Sugar Industries), located in Orange Walk on the Tower Hill Area.

== See also ==
- San Estevan (Maya site)
