= Corozal Bay =

Inlet of Chetumal Bay in Belize

Coordinates: 18°22′N 88°21′W

Corozal Bay is an inlet of Chetumal Bay, indenting northern Belize. Several resort areas are located on the coast of the bay, most notably Corozal Town. The New River (Belize) flows north into the bay. The town of Consejo is located north-northeast of the bay, on the much larger Chetumal Bay. Corozal Bay is contiguous to Chetumal Bay, and the two are often presented as a single combined ecoregion. The Mayan ruins of Cerros are located on the bay.
