= Classic stage =

Prehistoric period in the Americas

In archaeological cultures of North America, the classic stage is the theoretical North and Meso-American societies that existed between AD 500 and 1200. This stage is the fourth of five stages posited by Gordon Willey and Philip Phillips' 1958 book Method and Theory in American Archaeology.

Cultures of the Classic Stage are supposed to possess craft specialization and the beginnings of metallurgy. Social organization is supposed to involve the beginnings of urbanism and large ceremonial centers. Ideologically, Classic cultures should have a developed theocracy.

The "Classic Stage" was defined as restricted to the complex societies of Mesoamerica and Peru, and little beyond.

The "Classic Stage" followed the Formative stage (Pre-Classic) and was superseded by the Post-Classic stage. There are alternative classification systems, and this ranking would overlap what others classify as the Woodland period and Mississippian cultures.

1. The Lithic stage
2. The Archaic stage
3. The Formative stage
4. The Classic stage
5. The Post-Classic stage

== See also ==
Elsewhere

- Classic period in Mesoamerica
- Classic period in Belize

Other

- Archaeology of the Americas
- Category:Archaeology in the Americas
- Chachapoyas culture
- Cultural periods of Peru
- Olmec influences on Mesoamerican cultures
