= Pusilha =

Maya site classical period South Belize

Pusilhá
- Interactive map of Pusilhá
- 16°06′16.65″N 89°14′34.42″W
- Periods: Early Classic to Post Classic
- Cultures: Maya
- Location: Pusilá Abajo, Toledo district, Belize
- Region: Toledo district

History
- Built: 570 AD
- Abandoned: 798 AD

Site notes
- Architectural style: Classic
- Excavation dates: 2001 to Present
- Archaeologists: Geoffery Braswell and the Pusilha Archaeological Project

Pusilhá is an archaeological site in Belize. The location of this Late Classic Maya urban complex, along the east and west flow of trade, made the city a major transfer point for economic activities in the whole region. In addition, the city gave archaeologists a historical view of a secondary Maya site. Large and extended excavation efforts have changed the overall picture of Maya social and political relationships between larger and smaller cities and challenged the prevailing view of conquest and absorption of smaller cities into the larger cities in the region. The research conducted at Pusilhá began in 1927 and continues to this day.

== Location ==
The site of Pusilhá is located in the Toledo district of Belize in the town of San Benito Poité. Situated between the Poite and Pusilha rivers that run east and west, this may have impacted why the Maya urban complex was built there. The site is also located favorably between the Caribbean to the south and the Maya Mountains to the east. Pusilhá was also situated in the region to facilitate flow of goods and ideas from the central lowlands and southeastern periphery located in Honduras. With the major Maya urban sites of the central lowlands at Caracol and Tikal and the southern lowland site of Copan, Pusilhá was possibly a major transfer point for economic activities in the whole of the lowland region.

== Excavation ==
The initial site survey was conducted in 1927 by archaeologists from the British Museum Expedition to British Honduras, led by Thomas Joyce. The survey led to the removal of the best-preserved stelae from Pusilhá to the British Museum in London. The survey yielded dates and calendrical glyphs that were included in Sylvanus G. Morley's discussion work, The Inscriptions of Petén. Thomas Joyce also conducted an extensive ceramics evaluation in 1929. In the intervening 70 years very little research has been done in Pusilhá. This state of affairs has changed with research and excavations carried out by Geoffrey Braswell and the Pusilha Archaeological Project beginning in 2001. The excavation that has continued to present has exposed three major areas at the center of Pusilhá to archaeological interpretation.

== History ==
Pusilhá has a series of confirmed occupation dates. It is known through ceramic analysis that this site is dateable to the late classic. A stela found on site indicates a late classic occupation. According to Braswell, the current excavator of the site, "Stela P begins with the initial series date of 9.7.0.0.0 and contains a historical retrospective date of 9.6.17.8.18 (A.D. 570), implying that the kingdom was founded shortly before the beginning of the Late Classic period". He does state that excavations from surrounding residential areas away from the complex center seem to indicate an early classic occupation, but additional excavation is required to confirm this for the rest of the site. Transitions in ceramics, burials and construction, coupled with the usual cessation of inscriptions on stelae, indicate continued occupation at Pusilhá through to the post-classic. The last official date, which is a calendar round date, occurs at 9.18.7.10.3, or A. D. 798.

== Political ==
The initial excavation and surveys seem to show that politically, Pusilhá was a second-tier polity. The ceramics evidence showed that there were ties to Copan and Quirigua. It also seems likely that there were connections between Tikal and Caracol as those polities rose to prominence in the Petén. Based in part on the favorable location of Pusilhá along both east and west corridors of trade and the north and south axis of influence that had Caracol to the north and Copan to the south it seemed likely that the polity was politically dependent on one of its larger neighbors. However, the current archaeological evidence indicates that Pusilhá maintained its independence.

== Ruling Elite ==
The archaeological evidence indicates that Pusilhá was a traditional Maya "elite" led urban complex. There are eight rulers known to be associated with the Pusilhá emblem glyph from the late Classic period with two possibly additional from the Terminal Classic. In total, 39 named individuals have been discovered by the epigraphers in the hieroglyphic record. Of note is an individual who at first was linked as a ruler of Copan based on the artifactual record of that polity. K'ahk' Uti' Chan is the name of Ruler B of Pusilhá as well as Ruler 11 at Copan and was first ascribed to be the same individual. Further research has shown that they were contemporaries to each other and had different known parentages.

== Site Significance ==
The site of Pusilhá has one representation of bridge construction that has survived to modern times. The polity of Pusilhá also offers a look at the quantity and quality of the stelae available for study from a secondary urban complex. This site may represent an alternative method of looking at how the Maya used to govern themselves, which is contrary to the prevailing view of conquest and absorption of smaller cities into the larger cities in the region. Some say that research and excavation are at a very early stage and that more work is required to understand the place that Pusilhá holds in the greater Maya world.

== See also ==
- Maya civilization
- Trade in Maya civilization
- Maya stelae
