= Post-Classic stage =

Prehistoric period in the Americas

In the classification of the archaeology of the Americas, the Post-Classic stage is a term applied to some pre-Columbian cultures, typically ending with local contact with Europeans. This stage is the fifth of five archaeological stages posited by Gordon Willey and Philip Phillips' 1958 book Method and Theory in American Archaeology.

1. The Lithic stage
2. The Archaic stage
3. The Formative stage
4. The Classic stage
5. The Post-Classic stage

Cultures of the Post-Classic Stage are defined distinctly by possessing developed metallurgy. Social organization is supposed to involve complex urbanism and militarism. Ideologically, Post-Classic cultures are described as showing a tendency towards the secularization of society.

Post-classic Mesoamerica runs from about 900 to 1519 AD, and includes the following cultures: Aztec, Tarascans, Mixtec, Totonac, Pipil, Itzá, Kowoj, K'iche', Kaqchikel, Poqomam, Mam.

In the North American chronology, the "Post-Classic Stage" followed the Classic stage in certain areas, and typically dates from around AD 1200 to modern times.

== See also ==
Elsewhere

- Post-Classic period in Mesoamerica
- Post-Classic period in Belize

Other

- Aztec Empire
- Inca Empire
