= Minanha =

Archaeological site in Belize

Minanha is a Maya archeological site located on the North Vaca Plateau of west-central Belize. The Minanha area is divided into three tiers; the Epicenter or Epicentral Court Complex, the Site Core, and the greater Minanha community. The Epicenter is approximately 9.5 hectares in size and consists of a raised elite residential and ritual northern acropolis and a lower component to the south, which is thought to have been for administrative, ritual, and residential features.

Minanha is at the nexus of three different eco-zones: the Belize River Valley to the north, the granite-bearing zone of the Mountain Pine Ridge to the east, and the resource-rich Peten District of Guatemala to the west.

Minanha’s initial occupation was in the Middle Preclassic period between 600 BC to 400 BC , with continued occupation into the Late Preclassic period from 400 BC to AD 100 The period of greatest activity at Minanha in terms of architectural construction was in the Late Classic period between AD 675 to AD 810. Minanha experienced gradual abandonment in the Early Postclassic period between AD 900 to AD 1200. The known monuments of Minanha exhibit the Late Classic Caracol-style attributes. This is observed by the presence of an ancestor shrine complex comprising an eastern structure fronted by a slate stela and two uncarved compact limestone stelae, and a western structure with two uncarved limestone stelae on its summit, which are observed at the larger urban center of Caracol. Another Caracol-style attribute observed at Minanha is the construction of multiple entry tombs in both the epicenter and site core. There is also evidence of the construction of grave chambers long before they were used and the use of slate capstones in graves. Minanha also includes plazas, courtyards, patios, a ballcourt, and a causeway termini shrine. The southern area of the Minanha epicenter was focused on a civic-ceremonial orientation that included large public plazas and courtyards. Additionally, within the court complex, eight stelae have been discovered. Of those eight stelae, none exhibit glyphic texts, but two might have been inscribed originally. Of the stelae that might have been inscribed, one is a soft limestone monument.

The history of research at the site includes more than eight years of intensive investigations within the Minanha Epicenter 1999-2005, 2010, and continuing today. Minanha was discovered in 1922 by a chiclero, who investigated a burial chamber containing human remains and polychrome vessels. In March 1927, Thomas Gann and T. A. Joyce of the British Museum launched an expedition to investigate the ruins and upon discovering the surrounding landscape lacked surface water, the site was named “Minanha”, which roughly translates to “Place Without Water”.
