= San Estevan (Maya site) =

Archaeological Maya site in Belize

Coordinates: 18°8′21.99″N 88°30′51.23″W

- Interactive map of San Estevan
- Periods: Late Formative
- Cultures: Maya
- Location: San EstevanBelize

History
- Built: 300 B.C.

Site notes
- Excavation dates: 1965, 1973, 1975, 1989, 1990, 1999, 2005, 2008

The San Estevan archaeological site is located in northern Belize 1 km from the modern community of San Estevan, Belize. The site is a Maya civilization site occupied during the Formative (800 BC – AD 300) and Classic (AD 300 – 900) eras of Mesoamerican chronology. San Estevan is located on the New River halfway between the sites of Cerros and Lamanai. Beginning in the Late Formative period (300 BC – AD 300), San Estevan was a regional political center.

== Archaeological investigations ==
William Bullard mapped the civic-ceremonial center of the site in the 1960s where he carried out excavations and restored two Early Classic structures (I and II). During the Corozal Survey Project, Norman Hammond excavated at San Estevan and expanded Bullard's map with several additional plaza groups around the site core. It was the ceramic collections from these excavations at San Estevan along with initial testing at Nohmul, Santa Rita, Colha and Cuello that Duncan Pring first established the Swazey, Lopez Mamom and Cocos Chicannel phases. In 1989 and 1990, Laura Levi mapped outlying house groups at San Estevan in detail and excavated several domestic structures.

During the late 1990s, much of the monumental architecture in San Estevan's core was bulldozed and a large crater excavated for the underlying limestone marl in order to construct modern roads. Mound XV, at 15 m, is the highest structure remaining at the site and dates to the Late Formative period. This mound was only saved from the bulldozers due to the intervention of the Belize Department of Archaeology in the late 1990s. The damage to San Estevan is unfortunate, but provides remarkable access to the earliest occupation at the site's center. Taking advantage of the easy access to the earliest occupation levels, Robert Rosenswig of the University at Albany – SUNY began work on the earliest occupation levels at the site in 2002.

== See also ==
- History of Belize
