= Philip Phillips (archaeologist) =

American archaeologist (1900–1994)

Philip Phillips (August 11, 1900 – December 11, 1994) was an influential archaeologist in the United States during the 20th century.

== Early life ==
Phillips was born in Buffalo, New York on August 11, 1900. He was the son of Bradley H. Phillips and Ruth (née Harnden) Phillips.

After attending public schools in Buffalo, he entered Williams College in 1918, graduating in 1922. Although his first graduate work was in architecture, he later received a doctorate from Harvard University under advisor Alfred Marston Tozzer.

== Career ==
Phillips first archaeological experiences were on Iroquois sites, but he specialized in the Mississippian culture, especially its Lower Mississippi Valley incarnation.

In 1937, he was appointed assistant curator of Southeastern Archaeology at the Peabody Museum of Archaeology and Ethnology at Harvard. In 1949, he became its curator; and remained an honorary curator from his 1967 retirement until his death.

His professional collaborations with James A. Ford, James Bennett Griffin, and Gordon Willey have become some of the standard works of American archaeology.

== Personal life ==
In June 1922, shortly after graduating from Williams, Phillips was married in Buffalo to his "childhood sweetheart" Ruth Wilma Schoellkopf (1899–1961), a daughter of industrialist Jacob F. Schoellkopf Jr. Together, they were the parents of:

- Bradley Sawyer Phillips (1929–1991), who married the poet Violet Ranney Lang (1924–1956) in 1955; she died a year later of Hodgkin's disease at age 32.

In 1942, the Phillips resided in Cambridge, Massachusetts. Phillips died at his home in Bolton, Massachusetts on December 11, 1994. His professional obituary, including a summary of his life's accomplishments, was written by his lifelong colleague and collaborator Gordon R. Willey. It was published in 1996 by the Society for American Archaeology."

=== Legacy ===
Phillips had restored the Whitcomb Inn and Farm, the oldest house in Bolton, and had donated land to preserve for public use in the town.

== Published works ==
Phillips' published works include:

- Brain, Jeffrey P. and Philip Phillips. 1996. Shell Gorgets: Styles of the Late Prehistoric and Protohistoric Southeast. Peabody Museum Press, Cambridge, Massachusetts.
- Phillips, Philip. 1970. Archaeological Survey in the Lower Yazoo Basin, Mississippi, 1949-1955. Peabody Museum Papers, vol. 60. Harvard University, Cambridge.
- Phillips, Philip and J. A. Brown. 1975-83. Pre-Columbian Shell Engravings from the Craig Mound at Spiro, Oklahoma. (6 volumes) Cambridge, Peabody Museum Press.
- Phillips, Philip and J. A. Brown. 1984. Pre-Columbian Shell Engravings from the Craig Mound at Spiro, Oklahoma. (2-volume softbound edition) Cambridge, Peabody Museum Press.
- Phillips, Philip, James A. Ford, and James B. Griffin. 1951. Archaeological Survey in the Lower Mississippi Alluvial Valley, 1940-1947. Peabody Museum Papers, vol. 25. Harvard University, Cambridge.
- Willey, Gordon R. and Philip Phillips. 1958. Method and Theory in American Archaeology. University of Chicago Press, Chicago. 2001 pbk edition, with a new foreword by Gordon R. Willey and an introduction by the editors R. Lee Lyman and Michael J. O'Brien. University of Alabama Press. 2001-02-14. ISBN 9780817310882.
