= Gordon Willey =

American archaeologist

Gordon Randolph Willey
- Born: March 7, 1913; Chariton, Iowa, US
- Died: April 28, 2002 (aged 89); Cambridge, Massachusetts, US
- Occupation: Archaeologist
- Known for: Processual archaeology; Settlement pattern theories
- Awards: Viking Fund Medal (1953)

Gordon Randolph Willey (March 7, 1913 – April 28, 2002) was an American archaeologist who was described by colleagues as the "dean" of New World archaeology. Willey performed fieldwork at excavations in South America, Central America and the Southeastern United States; and pioneered the development and methodology for settlement patterns theories. He worked as an anthropologist for the Smithsonian Institution and as a professor at Harvard University.

== Early life and education ==
Gordon Randolph Willey was born in Chariton, Iowa. His family moved to California when he was twelve years old, and he completed his secondary education at Long Beach. Willey attended the University of Arizona where he earned Bachelors (1935) and Masters (1936) degrees in anthropology. He earned a PhD from Columbia University.

== Career ==
After completing his studies at Arizona, Willey moved to Macon, Georgia to perform field work for Arthur R. Kelly. Along with James A. Ford, Willey helped implement and refine ceramic stratigraphy, a concept new to Georgian archaeological sites. Willey also worked at the historic site of Kasita, on the Georgia Piedmont near Fort Benning. In 1938, Willey published an article entitled "Time Studies: Pottery and Trees in Georgia." In the early part of 1939, Willey worked at the Lamar Mounds and Village Site (inhabited from c. 1350 to 1600 CE) near Macon and identified relationships between Lamar and the Swift Creek (around 100–800 CE) and Late Woodland period Napier Phase (900–1000 CE) sites.

In the fall of 1939, Willey entered Columbia University for doctoral studies. After receiving his Ph.D., Willey worked as an anthropologist for the Smithsonian Institution in Washington, D.C.

In 1941, together with Marshall T. Newman, Willey conducted research at Ancon (archaeological site) in Peru, including in the area of Las Colinas.

In 1950, he accepted the Bowditch Professorship of Mexican and Central American Archaeology and Ethnology at Harvard University.

Willey headed archaeological expeditions in Peru, Panama, Nicaragua, Belize and Honduras. He discovered Monagrillo ceramics, the earliest known pottery in Panama. He became widely cited for his study and development of theories about the pattern of settlements of native societies. In particular, his study of settlement patterns in the Viru Valley of Peru exemplified Processual archaeology because it focused on the function of small satellite settlements and ceramic scattered across a landscape rather than pottery chronologies.

== Honors ==
In 1973, Willey received the Gold Medal Award for Distinguished Archaeological Achievement from the Archaeological Institute of America. He was elected a Fellow of the American Academy of Arts and Sciences in 1952, a member of the National Academy of Sciences in 1960, and the American Philosophical Society in 1984. He was also awarded the Kidder Award for Eminence in the Field of American Archaeology from the American Anthropological Association and the Huxley Medal from the Royal Anthropological Institute. He was given honorary doctorates by the University of Arizona and the University of Cambridge. In 1987, Willey received the Golden Plate Award of the American Academy of Achievement.

Add in: He was a Fellow of the Society of Antiquaries of London from 1956, and its first Honorary Vice-president. He was awarded the Society's gold medal in 2000. (See obituary in The Times, London, May 1, 2002)

== Personal life ==
Willey married Katharine W. Whaley in 1939. They were married for 63 years and had two daughters. Willey died of heart failure in Cambridge, Massachusetts at the age of 89.

== Selected works ==
- Archaeology of the Florida Gulf Coast, 1949
- Prehistoric Settlement Patterns in the Viru Valley, Peru, 1953
- Method and Theory in American Archaeology (with Philip Phillips), 1958
- Robert J. Braidwood and Gordon R. Willey, ed. (1966). Courses Toward Urban Life. Chicago: Aldine Publishing Company – via Internet Archive.
- A History of American Archaeology (with Jeremy Sabloff), 1980

== See also ==
- Ceramics of indigenous peoples of the Americas
- Mesoamerican chronology
- Mississippian culture pottery — 800 to 1600 CE.
- Speculative Period, term he coined to describe the early period of North American archaeology

== Notes ==
=== References ===
- Sabloff, Jeremy A. (September 2004). "Gordon Randolph Willey" (PDF). Proceedings of the American Philosophical Society Held at Philadelphia for Promoting Useful Knowledge. 148 (3). Philadelphia, Pennsylvania: APS: 406–410. ISSN 0003-049X. OCLC 200884163. Archived from the original (PDF online facsimile) on February 25, 2006.
- Waring, Antonio J. Jr. (1968). Stephen Williams (ed.). The Waring Papers: the collected works of Antonio J. Waring, Jr (originally published 1967 as vol. 58 of Harvard University's Peabody Museum of Archaeology and Ethnology papers, reprinted ed.). Athens, Georgia: University of Georgia Press. OCLC 8128645.
- Willey, Gordon R. (1989). "Gordon Willey". In Glyn Edmund Daniel; Christopher Chippindale (eds.). The Pastmasters: Eleven Modern Pioneers of Archaeology: V. Gordon Childe, Stuart Piggott, Charles Phillips, Christopher Hawkes, Seton Lloyd, Robert J. Braidwood, Gordon R. Willey, C.J. Becker, Sigfried J. De Laet, J. Desmond Clark, D.J. Mulvaney. New York: Thames & Hudson. pp. 100–110. ISBN 978-0-500-05051-4. OCLC 19750309.
