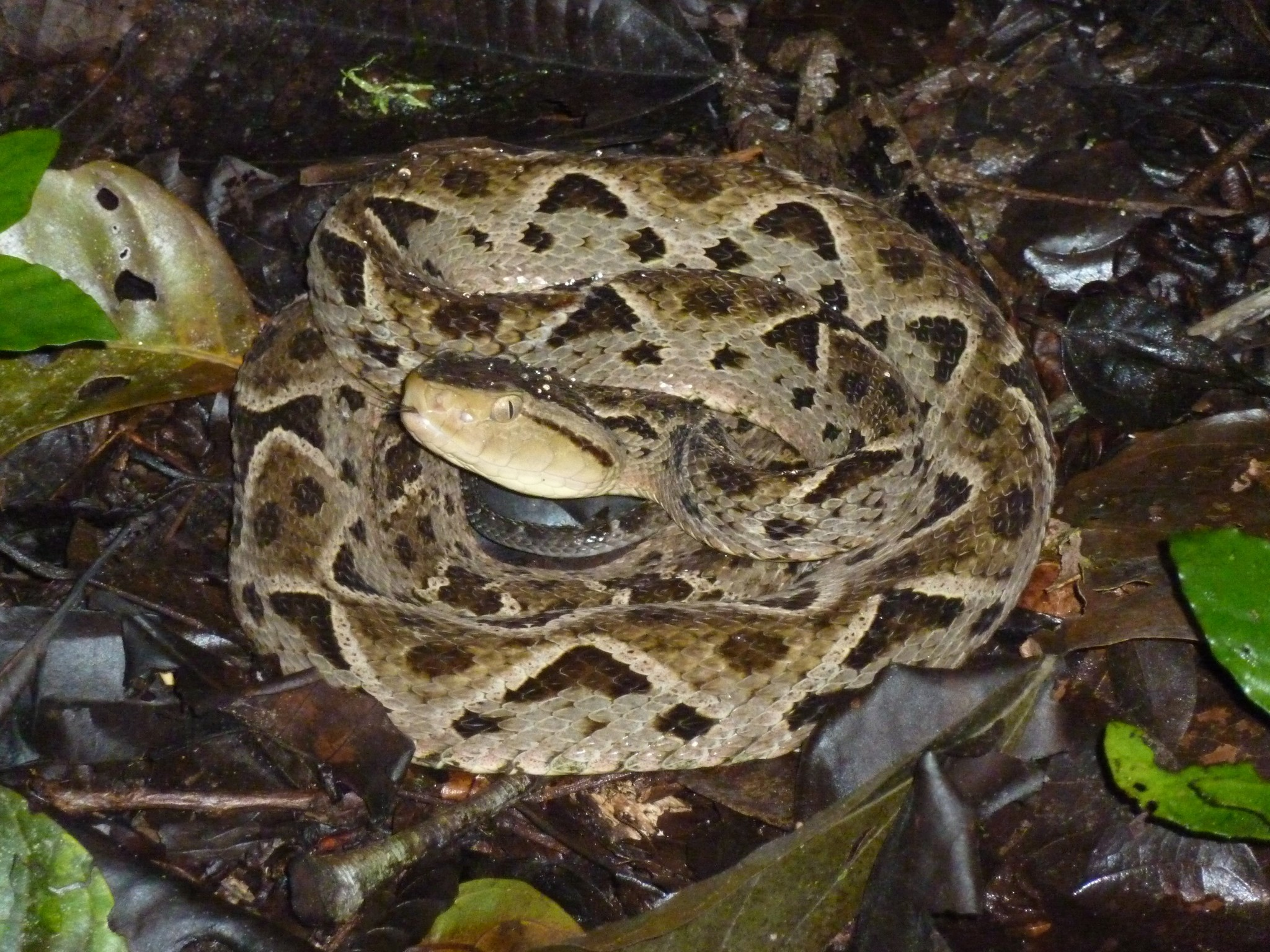

Conservation status
- Least Concern (IUCN 3.1)

Scientific classification
- Kingdom: Animalia
- Phylum: Chordata
- Class: Reptilia
- Order: Squamata
- Suborder: Serpentes
- Family: Viperidae
- Genus: Bothrops
- Species: B. asper

Binomial name
- Bothrops asper (Garman, 1884)
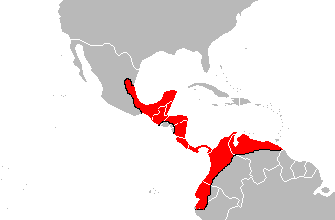
- Geographical range of Bothrops asper.

Synonyms
- List: B[othrops]. atrox var. dirus Jan, 1863; Trigonocephalus xanthogrammus Cope, 1868; Trigonocephalus asper Garman, 1884; B[othrops]. atrox septentrionalis F. Müller, 1885; B[othrops]. quadriscutatus Posada Arango, 1889; Lachesis xanthogrammus – Boulenger, 1896; Bothrops xanthogramma – Amaral, 1930; Bothrops atrox asper – H.M. Smith & Taylor, 1945; Bothrops asper – Stuart, 1963; Bothrops xantogrammus – Hoge, 1966; Trigonocephalus xantogrammus – Hoge, 1966; Lachesis xantogrammus – Hoge, 1966; Bothrops xantogramma – Hoge, 1966; Bothrops asper – J. Peters & Orejas-Miranda, 1970; Bothrops xanthogrammus – J. Peters & Orejas-Miranda, 1970; Bothrops andianus asper – Mertens, 1987; Bothrops lanceolatus asper – Sandner-Montilla, 1990; Bothrops atrox xanthogrammus – Schätti & Kramer, 1993; Bothrops asper – Greene, 1997

= Bothrops asper =

Species of snake

The terciopelo (Bothrops asper) (Note: Its common names include terciopelo in English and cuatro narices ("four noses") in Spanish, often called fer-de-lance among many other colloquial names.) is a species of pit viper found from north-east Mexico to northern South America. At low to moderate elevations, its habitat ranges from northeastern Mexico to Colombian and Ecuadorian Andes, as well as Venezuela. With a mass of up to 6 kilograms (13 lb), and a maximal length of 2.5 metres (8.2 ft), the terciopelo is among the largest vipers. It is light to dark brown in color, often with yellowish, zig-zag patterning on either side of its body. Dubbed "the ultimate pit-viper" for its defensiveness, large size, fangs and potent venom yield, it has a fearsome reputation, responsible for the most envenomated snakebites within its range, largely due to its proximity to humans, livestock and pets. Nonetheless, like all venomous snakes, the terciopelo actively avoids contact with humans and other larger animals, with bites generally only occurring when the snake is cornered, pursued, or threatened. No subspecies are currently recognized.

== Etymology ==
The generic name, Bothrops, comes from the Greek words bothros and ops, which mean 'pit' and 'face' (or 'eye'), respectively. This is a reference to these snakes' highly sensitive heat-detecting pit organs. The specific epithet, asper, which is a Latin word meaning 'rough' or 'harsh', may allude to the species' keeled dorsal scales.

== Common names ==
Some of the common names applied to this snake are terciopelo ("velvet" in Spanish), fer-de-lance, mapepire balsain (Trinidad), carpet labaria (Guyana), barba amarilla (Guatemala, Honduras, Nicaragua; "yellow beard"), equis (Ecuador and Panama; "x"), talla equis, mapaná (Colombia), mapanare (Venezuela), nauyaca (México; from Nahuatl nahui, four, and yacatl, nose; "four noses"), and yellow-jaw tommygoff (Belize)."

The name fer-de-lance is French (or possibly Créole), translating to "iron of the lance", "iron spear point" or simply "spearhead" or "lancehead". In English the name lancehead is applied to the genus Bothrops as a whole, and in combination with the majority of the species within the genus (e.g.: Alcatrazes lancehead (Bothrops alcatraz), Patagonian lancehead, (Bothrops ammodytoides), Andean lancehead (Bothrops andianus) etc.). The name fer-de-lance has been used inconsistently and very informally with several species in the genus Bothrops having been called fer-de-lance at one time or another, most commonly Bothrops asper, Bothrops atrox, Bothrops caribbaeus, and Bothrops lanceolatus. Several herpetologists have preferred and argued to restrict the name fer-de-lance to the Martinique lancehead (Bothrops lanceolatus) from the French speaking Caribbean Island of Martinique, but popular usage has rarely recognized any distinction. In their seminal opus on the venomous reptiles of the Western hemisphere, Campbell & Lamar stated: "The name fer-de lance, widely used in North America with reference to B. asper and B. atrox, has no legitimate origin of use in regions inhabited by this snake" [e.g. Spanish and Portuguese speaking countries]. In an effort to establish standardized names for the amphibians and reptiles of North America, the Society for the Study of Amphibians and Reptiles (SSAR), a not-for-profit organization and one of the largest international herpetological societies, applied the following nomenclature:

- Bothrops Wagler, 1824: Lanceheads (English)
- Bothrops asper (Garman, 1884[1883]): Terciopelo (English)

In recent decades, herpetologists have preferred the name 'terciopelo' for Bothrops asper, although the term fer-de-lance is still common in popular usage.

== Description ==
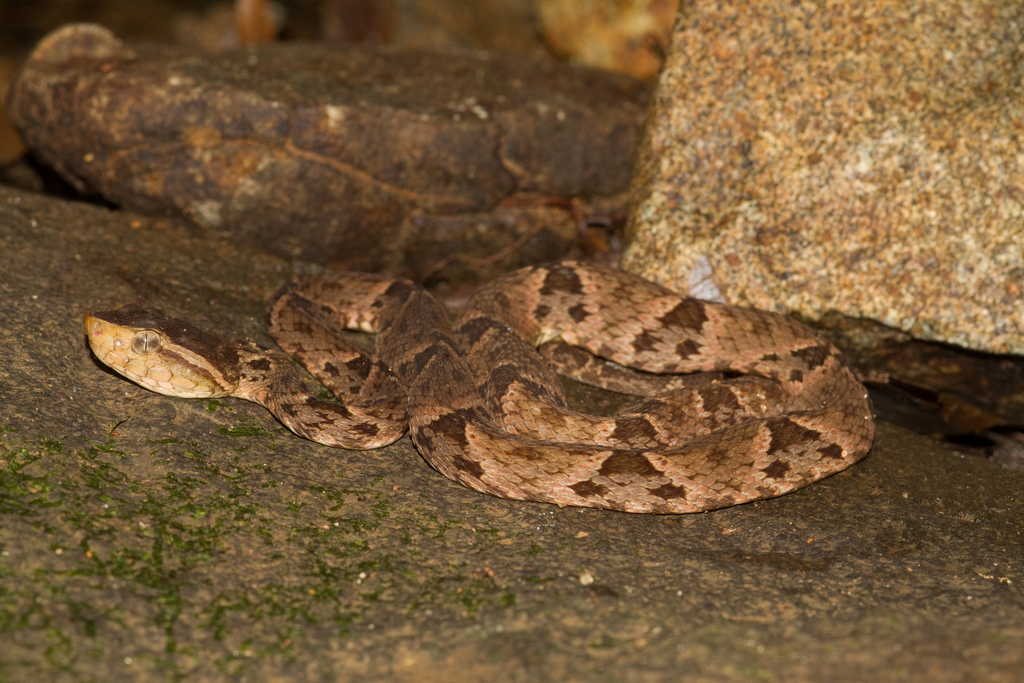
B. asper, Panama

Bothrops species can be distinguished by their broad, flattened heads which are set apart from the rest of their bodies. The head of this snake is light to dark brown or even black. Although usually absent, it may have occipital blotches or streaks that range from indistinct to distinct. The underside is most often pale yellow. This species has different patterns and colors on its dorsal and ventral sides and it exhibits a postorbital stripe. The ventral side is yellow, cream, or a whitish gray, with dark blotches that are more frequent closer to the posterior end. Ventrolaterally, B. asper has interchanging gray scales which are more pale towards the medial line. Dark triangles with pale edges can be seen laterally, which range in number from 18 to 25. Apices either alternate or are reflective of each other over the middorsal line. In the interspaces, there are dark, paravertebral blotches. Specimens may have a yellow zig-zag-shaped line on each side of the body. There is a great variety of colours on its dorsal side: olive, gray, light brown to dark brown, tan or sometimes nearly black. To prevent water loss where they occur in drier regions, this species has more scales.

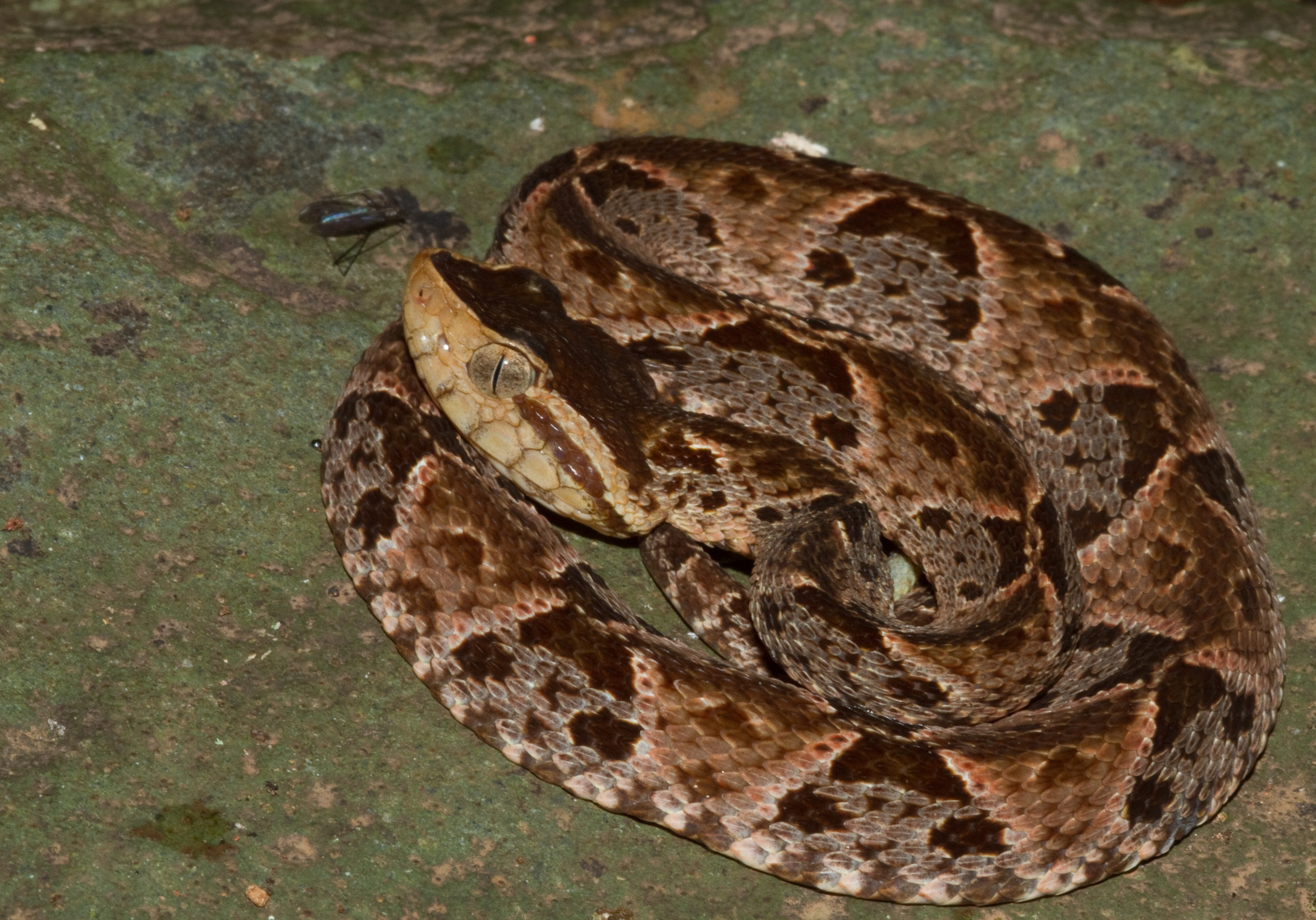
Coiled terciopelo in Panama

Specimens of this species may weigh up to 6 kilograms (13 lb) and are often 1.2 to 1.8 meters (3.9 to 5.9 ft) in length. Very big females can reach lengths up to 2.5 metres (8.2 ft), although this is uncommon. These are among the most sexually dimorphic of all snakes. The two sexes are born the same size, but by age 7 to 12 months, females begin to grow at a much faster rate than males. Females have thick, heavy bodies and grow significantly larger than males. They also have heads two or three times the size of males relative to their size and proportionally bigger fangs (typically 2.5 cm), as well.

Across its geographic range, this species varies greatly phenotypically. As a result, great confusion between it and other related species, most notably Bothrops atrox, which is similar in color but usually has yellow or rust-like tones and rectangular or trapezoidal blotches.

== Distribution ==
It is found on the Gulf - Atlantic versant of eastern Mexico as far north as the state of Tamaulipas, southward through the entire Yucatán Peninsula extending into Central America, including Guatemala, Belize, Honduras, Nicaragua, Costa Rica and Panama. An isolated population occurs in southeastern Chiapas (Mexico) and southwestern Guatemala. In northern South America, it is found in Colombia, Ecuador, Guyana and Venezuela. The type locality given is "Obispo, on the Isthmus of Darien" (Panama).

This is mostly a lowland species that, in Mexico and Central America, occurs from about sea level to 1,200 to 1,300 meters (3,900 to 4,300 ft) altitude. In South America, it apparently ranges to considerably higher elevations: up to 2,500 metres (8,200 ft) in Venezuela and at least 2,640 metres (8,660 ft) in Colombia according to herpetologist Lancini.

According to Campbell and Lamar (2004), its range in Ecuador extends as far south along the Pacific coast as El Oro Province and the Vilcabamba area of the Río Catamayo Valley. This species is reported to occur from seven (Bolívar, Carchi, Chimborazo, Esmeraldas, Guayas, Los Ríos and Pichincha) of the fourteen provinces along the Pacific slope of Ecuador. There are even a few records from northern coastal Peru, with these snakes being reported in the Tumbes Region. It is also known from the island of Gorgona off the Pacific coast of Colombia.

B. asper occurs throughout the inter-Andes valleys of Colombia across the Caribbean coastal plain through central Venezuela north of the Orinoco as far east as the Delta Amacuro region. This is the only Bothrops species that occurs on the island of Trinidad, although the situation there is complicated due to proximity of Trinidad to the Orinoco Delta where it may be sympatric with B. atrox.

Due to the casual and informal application of the name "Fer-de-lance" being applied to any number of species of Latin America pit vipers in the genus Bothrops, there is much confusion and misunderstanding, particularly in popular literature, as to proper nomenclature. Populations of Bothrops often referred to as Fer-de-lance on the island of Saint Lucia are Bothrops caribbaeus. Populations of Bothrops referred to as Fer-de-lance on the island of Martinique are regarded as Bothrops lanceolatus.

== Habitat ==
This species likes moist environments, and occurs in most life zones located at low or middle elevations (up to 600 metres (2,000 ft)), excluding those with strong seasonal dry periods. They are, however, sometimes found at much higher elevations. This is true in the premontane forest in Costa Rica, the cloud forest of Guatemala and Mexico, or the lower montane wet forest in the Caribbean Region of Colombia and Ecuador. It chiefly inhabits tropical rainforest and evergreen forest, but it also occurs in drier areas of tropical deciduous forest, thorn forest and pine savannah near lakes, rivers and streams. The home range of B. asper averages between 3.71 ha and 5.95 ha, which is comparatively small in relation to other pitvipers.

== Behavior ==
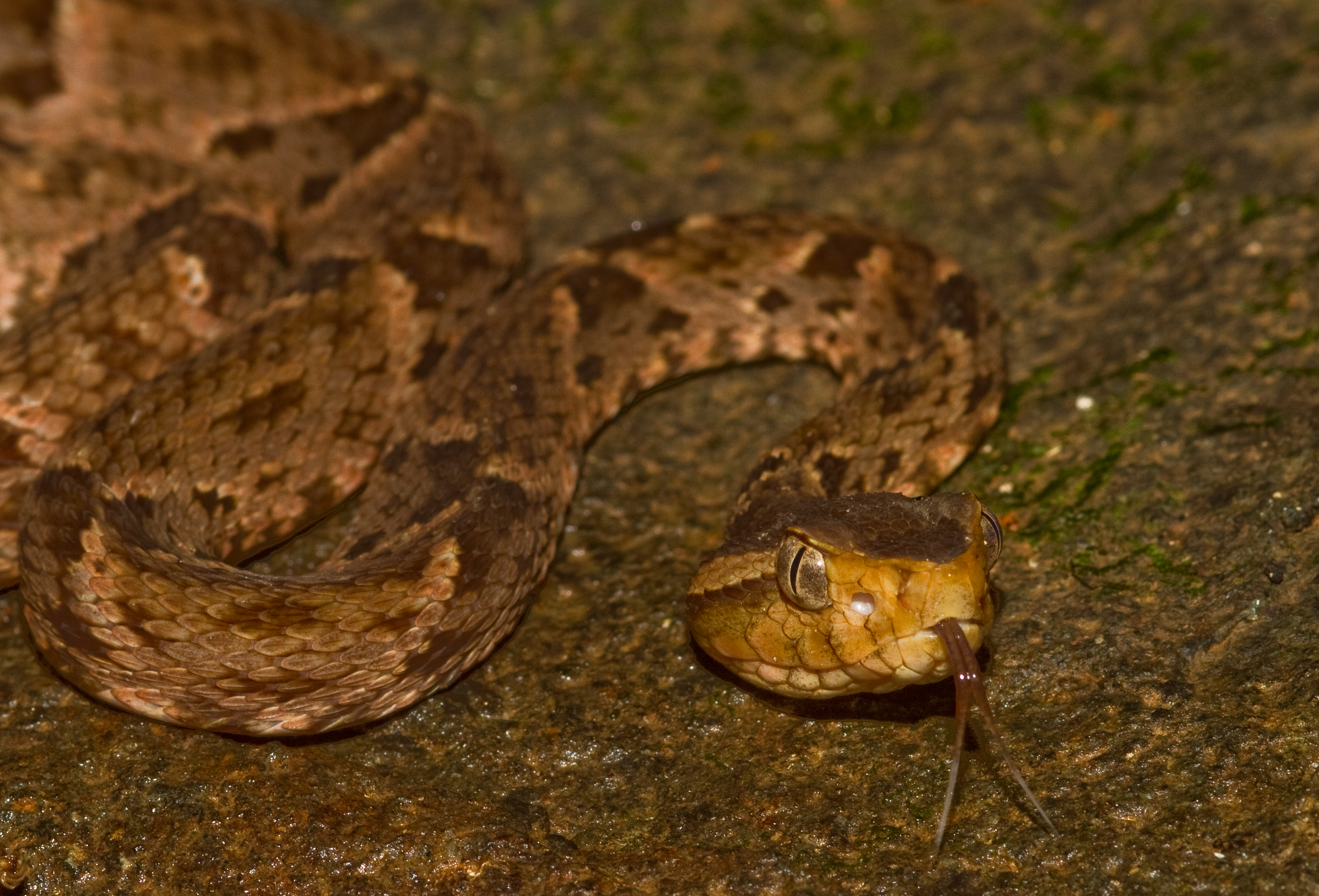
B. asper, Panama

B. asper is nocturnal and solitary. It is less active in colder and drier periods. This species is often found near rivers and streams, basking in the sun during the day and lying still while well camouflaged in leaf litter or under forest cover waiting to ambush prey such as rats and mice that come within range during the night. When cornered or threatened, this species can be very defensive and may exhibit an S-coiled defense display. Juveniles are often semiarboreal, and even adults are sometimes encountered in bushes and low trees. Juveniles are also known to exhibit caudal luring, a use of their differently colored tail tips to lure prey. Although both males and females display this behavior, only males have bright coloured tail tips.

Compared to the common lancehead, B. atrox, these snakes have been described as excitable and unpredictable when disturbed. They can, and often will, move very quickly, usually opting to flee from danger, but are capable of suddenly reversing direction to vigorously defend themselves. Adult specimens, when cornered and fully alert, are dangerous. In a review of bites from this species suffered by field biologists, Hardy (1994) referred to it as the "ultimate pit viper".

== Diet ==
Bothrops asper is a diet generalist and is known to prey on a remarkably wide range of animals. A generalized ontogenetic diet shift occurs, with a higher percentage of ectothermic prey in juveniles, changing to a greater percentage of endothermic prey in adults, particularly small mammals. However both juveniles and adults, regardless of size or age, are known to opportunistically prey on ectothermic and endothermic species. Reports of invertebrate and insect remains in the digestive tracts along with frog and lizard remains are believed to represent secondary ingestion, however the dissection of several specimens containing only insect remains such as beetles (Coleoptera), and bugs (Hemiptera) are believed to reflect insects as primary prey too. Cannibalism has been reported in both captive and wild juveniles and the species is known to scavenge on dead frogs and rodents.

Just a few of the documented ectothermic prey items include: small to moderately-sized centipedes (specifically Scolopendra angulata), beetles (Coleoptera), grasshoppers (Orthoptera), flies (Diptera), hemipterans (Hemiptera), ants (Formicidae), crayfish (Astacidea), eels (Synbranchus); caecilians (Dermophis), frogs (Eleutherodactylus, Leptodactylus, Lithobates, Pristimantis, Rhinella, Smilisca), toads (Rhinella), amphisbaenians (Amphisbaena), lizards (Alopoglossus, Ameiva, Anolis, Ctenosaura, Gonatodes), and snakes (Bothrops, Dipsas, Erythrolamprus, Ninia). Endothermic prey species include: bay wren (Cantorchilus nigricapillus), grey-headed tanager (Eucometis penicillata), wren (Troglodytes), blue-black grassquit (Volatinia jacarina), Central American woolly opossum (Caluromys derbianus), common opossum (Didelphis marsupialis), Desmarest's spiny pocket mouse (Heteromys desmarestianus), dusky rice rat (Melanomys caliginosus), black rat (Rattus rattus), Rothschild's porcupine (Coendou rothschildi), Brazilian cottontail (Sylvilagus brasiliensis), least shrew (Cryptotis parva), and possibly skunks.

== Reproduction ==
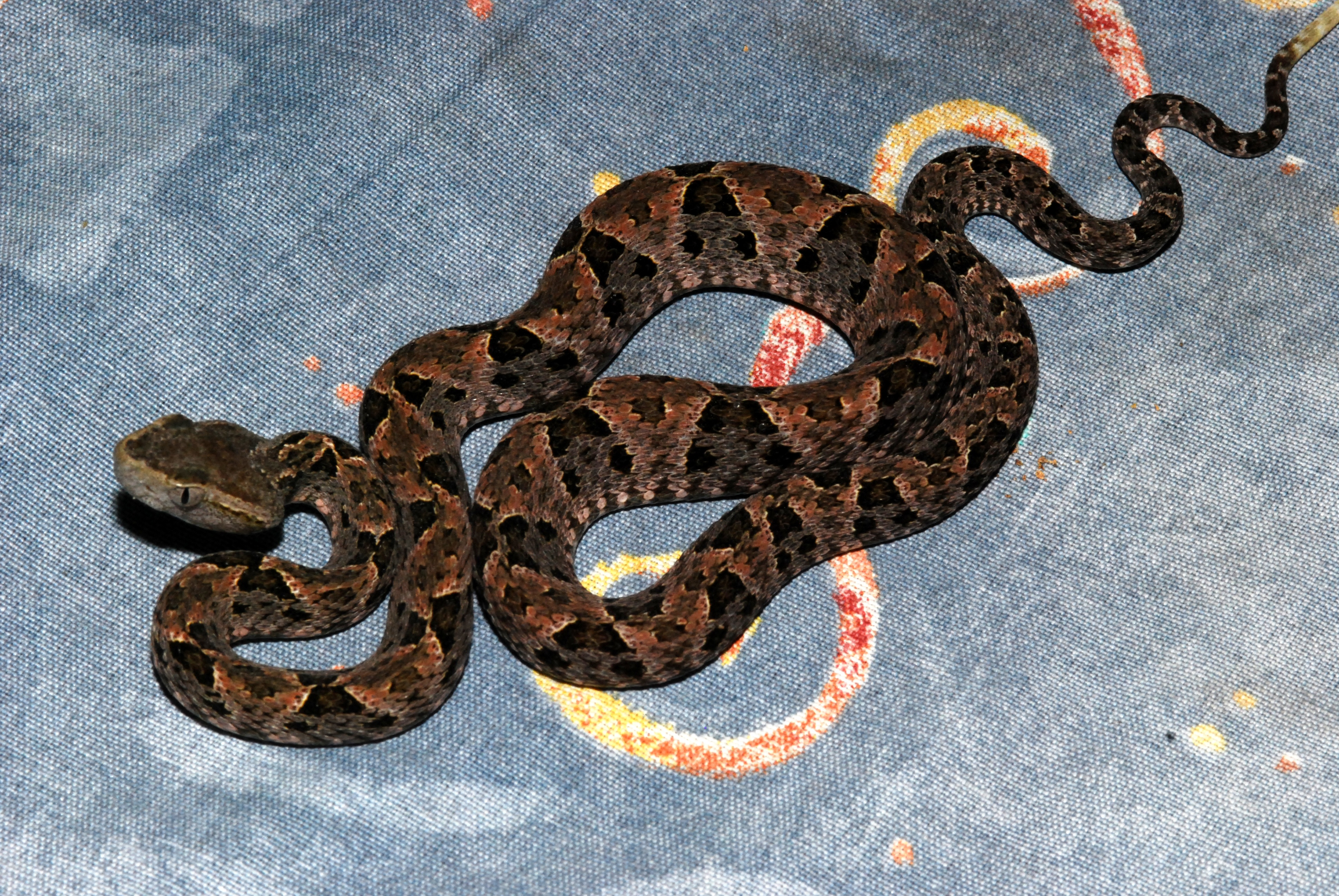
Young terciopelo on a hotel couch, El Remate, Guatemala

The timing of the reproductive cycle and the litter size of this species vary according to location: in some parts of Costa Rica, for example, it is more prolific than in others. Reproduction is highly seasonal and in Costa Rica, reproductive cycles are tightly related to rainfall patterns. The timing of breeding differs between populations in the Caribbean and Pacific lowlands. On the Pacific side, mating took place between September and November, with females giving birth between April and June. The average number of offspring was 18.6 (five to 40) in this population. Neonates ranged in total length from 28 to 34.6 centimeters (11.0 to 13.6 in) and in weight from 6.7 to 13.1 grams (0.24 to 0.46 oz). On the Atlantic side, mating was observed in March, and births occurred between September and November. The average number of offspring was 41.1 (14–86), whereas the total length of neonates ranged from 27 to 36.5 centimeters (10.6 to 14.4 in), and weighed from 6.1 to 20.2 grams (0.22 to 0.71 oz). In both populations, gestation time ranged from six to eight months, and the size of a litter correlated significantly with the size of the female. This species is considered to be the most prolific of all snakes in the Americas.

Male-male combat in this species has not been observed. Females will mate with more than one male during mating season. Mating includes a series of movements of the male, which then slowly chases an accepting female. The female then stops movement and extends her posture to mate. It is not known whether this species exhibits annual or biannual reproduction.

== Venom ==
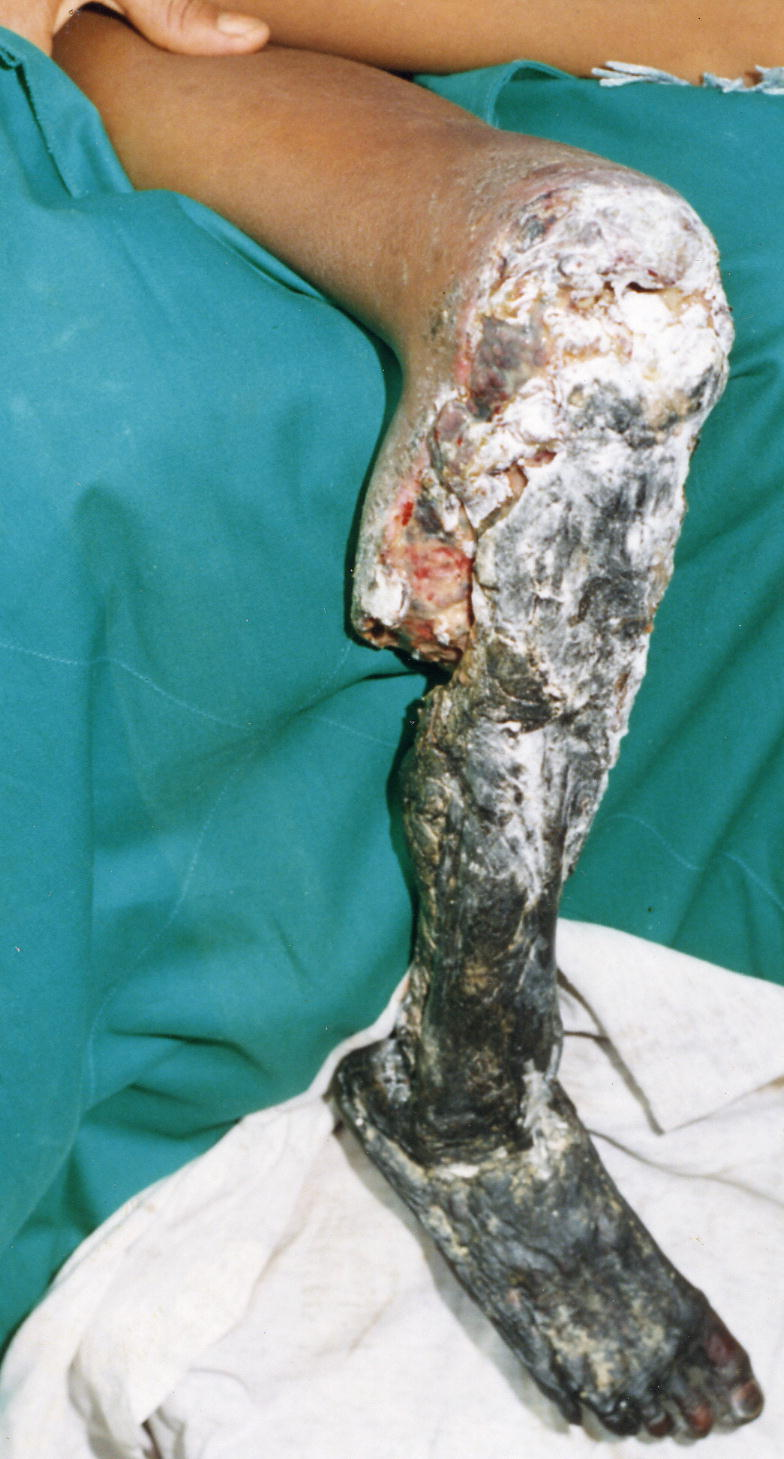
Severe tissue necrosis following B. asper envenomation – The tissue necrosis resulted in gangrene and the doctors had to amputate the leg above the knee. The victim was an 11-year-old boy, bitten two weeks earlier in Ecuador, but treated only with antibiotics.

B. asper, together with Crotalus durissus, is the leading cause of snakebite in Yucatán, Mexico.

It is considered the most dangerous snake in Costa Rica, responsible for 46% of all bites and 30% of all hospitalized cases; before 1947, the fatality rate was 9%, but this has since declined to almost 0% (Bolaños, 1984), mostly due to the Clodomiro Picado Research Institute, responsible for the production of snake antiophidic sera (which are also exported to other countries in Latin America and Africa) and scientific research on serpents and their venoms, as well as educational and extension programs in rural areas and hospitals.

In the Colombian states of Antioquia and Chocó, it causes 50–70% of all snakebites, with a sequelae rate of 9% and a fatality rate of 6% (Otero et al., 1992).

In the state of Lara, Venezuela, it is responsible for 78% of all envenomations and all snakebite fatalities (Dao-L., 1971). One of the reasons so many people are bitten is because of its association with human habitation; many bites occur indoors (Sasa & Vázquez, 2003).

Herpetologist Douglas March died after being bitten by this species.

This species is irritable and fast-moving. It is also regarded as being more excitable and unpredictable than B. atrox. Its large size and habit of raising its head high off the ground can result in bites above the knee. It has also been observed to eject venom over a distance of at least 6 ft (1.8 m) in fine jets from the tips of its fangs (Mole, 1924).

Bite symptoms include pain, oozing from the puncture wounds, local swelling that may increase for up to 36 hours, bruising that spreads from the bite site, blisters, numbness, mild fever, headache, bleeding from the nose and gums, hemoptysis, gastrointestinal bleeding, hematuria, hypotension, nausea, vomiting, impaired consciousness and tenderness of the spleen. In untreated cases, local necrosis frequently occurs and may cause gangrene which often requires amputation. In 12 fatal cases, the cause of death was sepsis (5), intracranial hemorrhage (3), acute kidney injury with hyperkalemia and metabolic acidosis (2) and hemorrhagic shock (1).

Venom yield (dry weight) averages 458 mg, with a maximum of 1530 mg (Bolaños, 1984) and an LD_{50} in mice of 2.844 mg/kg IP.

The venomous bite of B. asper has been suggested to have been a factor in the choice of certain Mayan settlements, such as Nim Li Punit, Belize Central America, where the thick jungle inhabited by these snakes was used as a defensive boundary.

The venom of the fer-de-lance is so potent that didelphine opossums (i.e., opossums like the Virginia opossum), which are normally immune to the venom of pit vipers and rattlesnakes, are still capable of succumbing to the venom of this snake. This is especially the case if the opossum is not fully grown (and thus the venom is more concentrated per gram). Indeed, the extremely potent venom of B. asper has been suggested to have evolved as part of an evolutionary arms race between these snakes and didelphine opossums, as a defensive adaptation to prevent predation by opossums, an adaptation that allowed fer-de-lances to prey on large opossums, or both.

== Taxonomy ==
This species was once regarded as a subspecies of B. atrox and can still often be confused with it.
