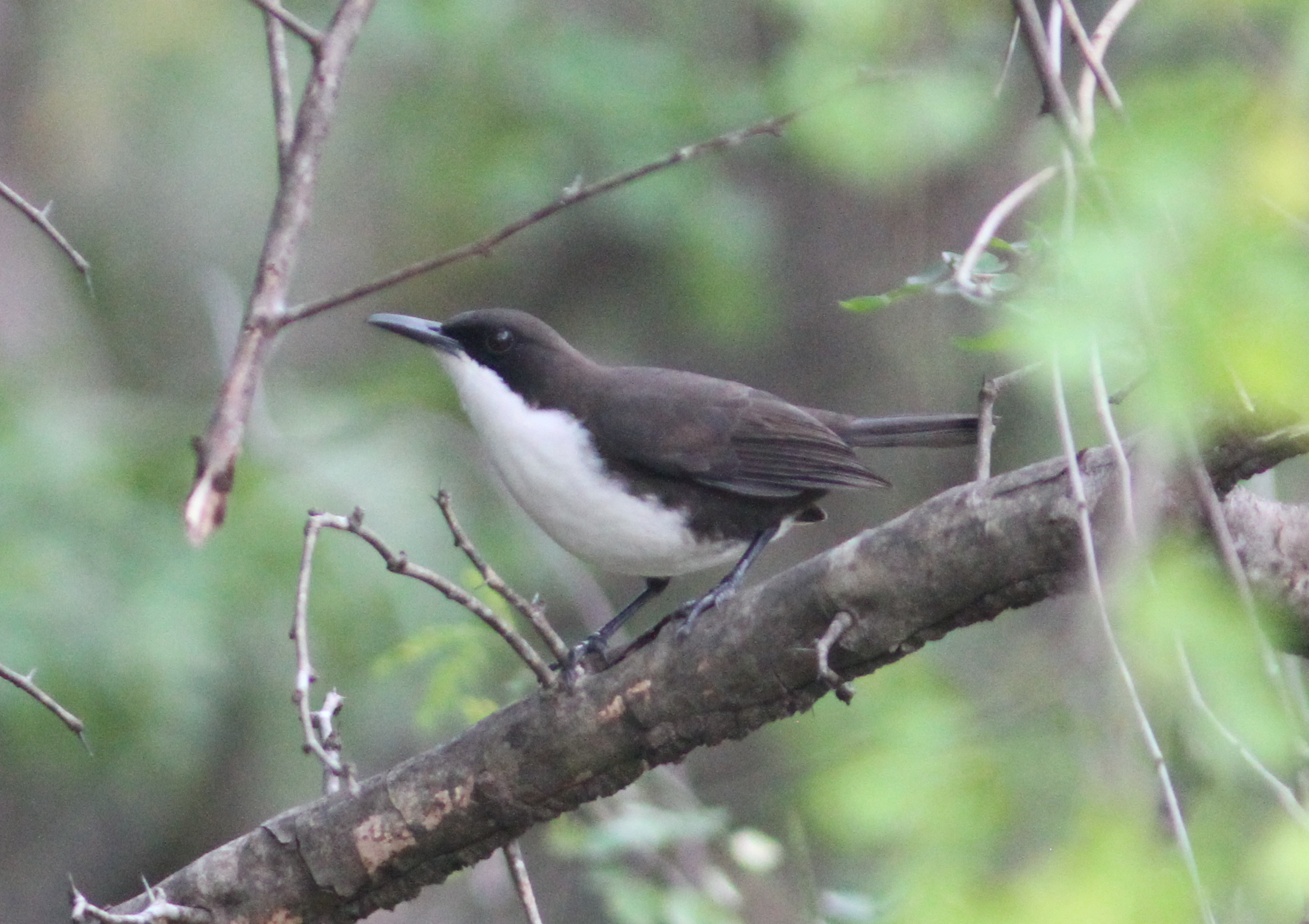

Scientific classification
- Kingdom: Animalia
- Phylum: Chordata
- Class: Aves
- Order: Passeriformes
- Family: Mimidae
- Genus: Ramphocinclus
- Species: R. sanctaeluciae

Binomial name
- Ramphocinclus sanctaeluciae Cory, 1887
- Range of R. sanctaeluciae Resident Extirpated

Audio
- Calling birds recorded on St. Lucia

= St. Lucia thrasher =

Species of bird

The St. Lucia thrasher (Ramphocinclus sanctaeluciae), locally known as the gorge blanc, is a species of mimid in the genus Ramphocinclus. It is endemic to the island nation of St. Lucia in the Caribbean. It was formerly considered to be a conspecific with the Martinique thrasher under the name white-breasted thrasher.

== Taxonomy ==
The St. Lucia thrasher was first described in 1887 by ornithologist Charles B. Cory. It was later lumped into the white-breasted thrasher based on a work by Hellmayr in 1934. Following studies from 2016, 2019, and 2024, the St. Lucia thrasher was classified as a distinct species by the IOC, AOS, and Clements checklist. The St. Lucia thrasher is monotypic.

== Description ==
On the island of St. Lucia, its plumage makes it unmistakable, with dark brown upperparts and pale white underparts. It can be distinguished by its relative the Martinique thrasher by its brown back, compared to the Martinique thrasher's slaty back and is larger overall.

== Behaviour ==
The St. Lucia thrasher is usually silent, but makes a raspy call when defending its territory. It can be quite noisy when defending its territory, both against other species and other St. Lucia thrashers, and performs a display similar to a Trembler where it cocks its tail and droops its wings then flutters them. Like others in its family, it is primarily an insectivore, foraging in leaf litter on the ground. Pairs nest in riparian habitat near streams, with nests being recorded being 2–6 metres (6.6–19.7 ft) up in trees.

== Habitat ==
The species inhabits dense coastal scrub forests, preferring forests with leaf litter and little to no ground vegetation.

== Conservation ==
Prior to its formal description in 1887, it was described as being common on St. Lucia by Semper in 1872. But by 1927, it was considered rare when ornithologist James Bond succeeded in finding a small colony and obtained one specimen. During the early 1930s the species was even believed to be extinct due to failed efforts to locate the colony discovered by Bond. However the species was rediscovered in 1932 near Desbarras. In 1987 a census by the University of East Anglia found only 58 pairs. Its greatest threat has historically been habitat destruction, with land clearing for plantations and destructions caused by livestock being the driving factors. While part of the range of the Martinique thrasher is protected, little to none of the St. Lucia thrasher's range is, making habitat destruction an even greater threat. The Saint Lucia lancehead is thought to be a natural predator of eggs and fledglings. A 2016 study estimated that there were 1,130 mature individuals.
