= Scouts et Guides de Martinique =

Scouts and Guides programs in a colony of France

Scouts de Martinique
- Location: Boîte Postale 813, 97207 Fort-de-France
- Country: Martinique

Scouting in Martinique is administered by the Scouts et Guides de France as an overseas branch or region known as the Scouts et Guides de Martinique. Scouts participate in many Caribbean activities such as camps and jamborees.

The Scout emblem incorporates elements of the old coat of arms of Martinique, as well as the old arms of French Guiana and Guadeloupe.

== See also ==
- Scouting in France
