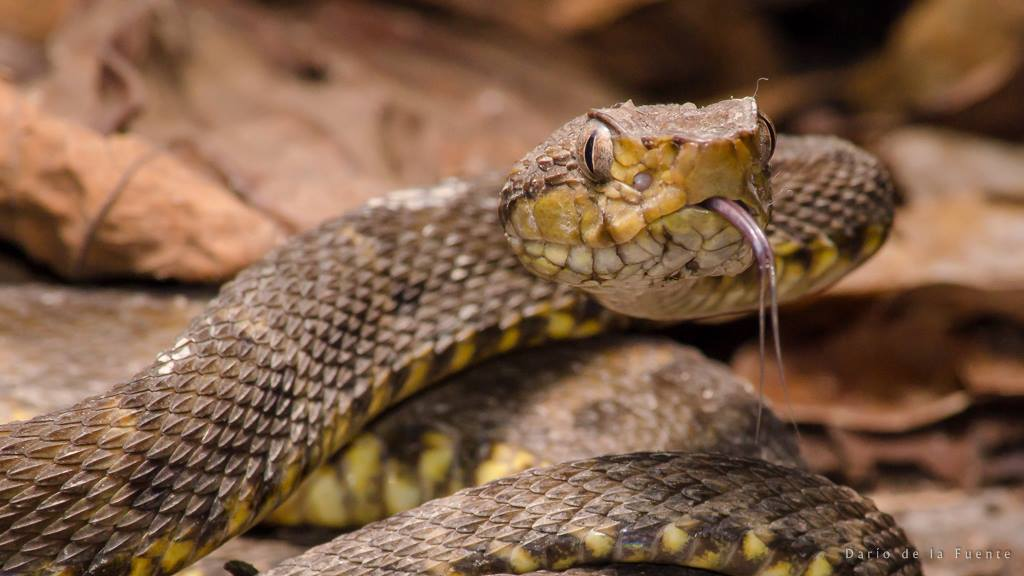
- Bothrops atrox: Note the sensory pit, the pupil of the eye, and the keeled scales. This colour variant was photographed in Ecuador.

Conservation status
- Least Concern (IUCN 3.1)

Scientific classification
- Kingdom: Animalia
- Phylum: Chordata
- Class: Reptilia
- Order: Squamata
- Suborder: Serpentes
- Family: Viperidae
- Genus: Bothrops
- Species: B. atrox

Binomial name
- Bothrops atrox (Linnaeus, 1758)

Synonyms
- Coluber atrox Linnaeus, 1758; [Coluber] ambiguus Gmelin, 1788; Vipera Weigeli Daudin, 1803; Cophias holocericeus Wied-Neuwied, 1821; Trigonoceph[alus]. atrox – Schinz, 1822; Vipera atrox Weigelii – Schinz, 1822; Trigonoceph[alus]. holocericeus – Schinz, 1822; Bothrops furia Wagler, 1824; Bothrops tessellatus Wagler, 1824; Craspedocephalus atrox – Fitzinger, 1826; Craspedocephalus Weigelii – Fitzinger, 1826; [Bothrops] atrox – Wagler, 1830; [Bothrops] ambiguus – Wagler, 1830; T[rigonocephalus]. atrox – Schlegel, 1837; Trigonocephalus Colombiensis Hallowell, 1845; Bothrops affinis Gray, 1849; Bothrops atrox var. tessellatus – Jan & Sordelli, 1875; Lachesis atrox – Boulenger, 1896; Botrhops atrox – Recinos, 1913; B[othrops]. Neuvoiedii Venezuelenzi Briceño Rossi, 1934; Trimeresurus atrox – Schmidt & Walker, 1943; Bothrops atrox atrox – Hoge, 1952; Bothrops colombiensis – Hoge, 1966; Bothrops atrox colombiensis – Gubensk, Turk & Drujan, 1978; Bothrops isabelae Sandner-Montilla, 1979; Bothrops lanceolatus aidae Sandner-Montilla, 1981; B[othrops]. atrox aidae – Vanzolini, 1986; Bothrops lanceolatus nacaritae Sandner-Montilla, 1990

= Bothrops atrox =

Species of snake

Bothrops atrox — also known as the common lancehead, fer-de-lance, barba amarilla, and mapepire balsain — is a highly venomous pit viper species found in the tropical lowlands of northern South America east of the Andes, as well as the Caribbean island of Trinidad. No subspecies are currently recognized.

== Taxonomy ==
The common lancehead was one of the many reptile and amphibian species described by Carl Linnaeus in the landmark 1758 10th edition of his Systema Naturae, where it was given the binomial name Coluber atrox. The taxonomy of this species is controversial; it may include B. leucurus and B. moojeni, and some of its populations are sometimes said to be separate species. B. asper was formerly included in this species, but most authorities now consider it distinct.

== Names ==
Common names include lancehead, fer-de-lance, barba amarilla, and mapepire balsain, among others.

The Spanish common name barba amarilla (yellow beard), an allusion to the pale-yellow chin color, is also used in English. In Venezuela, it is called mapanare. In Colombia, it is known as mapaná (Llanos of Vichada) and talla equis. In Guyana and Suriname, it is called labaria or labarria. In Peru, it is called aroani (Yagua), cascabel (juveniles), ihdóni (Bora), jergón, jergona, jergón de la selva, macánchi (Alto Marañón), machacú, marashar and nashipkit (Aguaruna names). The name jergón is an allusion to the X-like markings of the color pattern. In Ecuador and Panama, these markings have led to the snake simply being referred to as equis (the Spanish name of the letter 'x'). In Trinidad, it is known as mapepire balsain. In Bolivia, it is called Yoperojobobo. In Brazil, the common names are jararaca or Jararaca-do-norte. The name fer-de-lance comes from French, meaning, "head of a lance", "spearhead", or literally "lance iron".

== Description ==
A terrestrial species, adults usually grow to a total length 75–125 cm (about 30–50 inches) and are moderately heavy-bodied. Reports of the maximum size are not clear, as this species is often confused with B. asper. Soini (1974) mentioned of a series of 80 specimens collected in northeastern Peru, the largest was a female of 138.8 cm (4 ft 6.6 in). The largest specimen measured by Campbell and Lamar (2004) was a female with a total length of 162 cm (5 ft 4 in).

The scalation includes 23–29 (usually 23–25) rows of dorsal scales at midbody, 169–214 and 177–214 ventral scales in males and females, respectively, 52–86 (usually 75 or fewer) subcaudal scales in males, which are usually divided, and 47–72 subcaudals in females. On the head, the rostral scale is about as high, or slightly higher, than it is wide. There are three to 11 (usually five to 9) keeled intersupraocular scales, seven to 13 (usually eight to 11) sublabial scales and six to 9 (usually seven) supralabial scales, the second of which is fused with the prelacunal to form a lacunolabial.

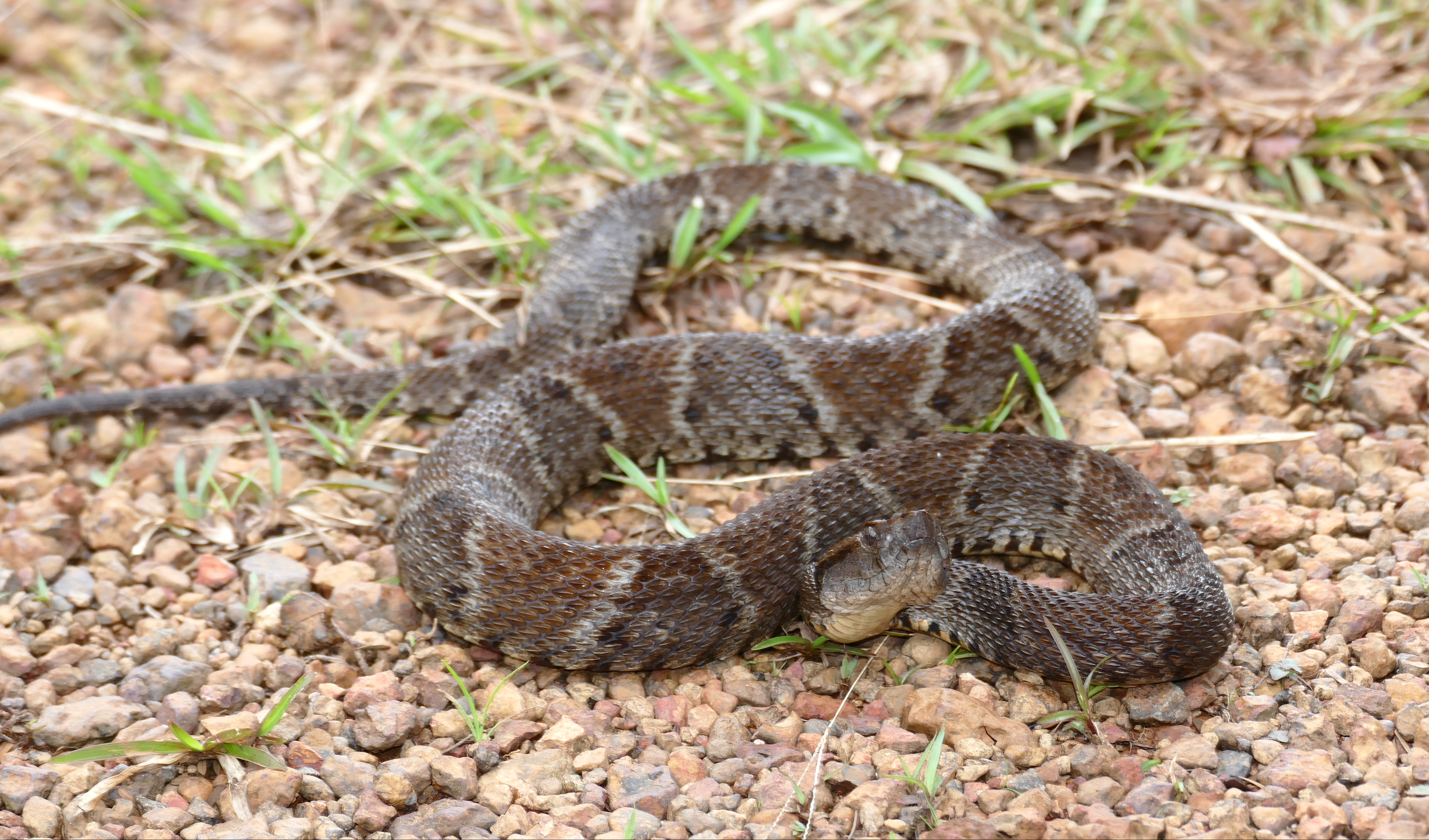
Bothrops atrox colour variant in French Guiana: Irrespective of colour, this underlying pattern of banding is typical of most populations.

The color pattern is highly variable, including a ground color that may be olive, brown, tan, gray, yellow, or (rarely) rusty. The body markings are highly variable, as is the degree of contrast; in some specimens, the pattern is very well defined, while in others, it may be virtually absent. In general, however, the body pattern consists of a series of dorsolateral blotches, rectangular or trapezoidal in shape, which extend from the first scale row to the middle of the back. These blotches may oppose or alternate across the midline, often fusing to form bands. They also have pale borders, which in some cases may be prominent, and may be invaded from below by tan or gray pigment, occasionally dividing them into pairs of ventrolateral spots. The belly may be white, cream, or yellowish gray, with an increasing amount of gray to black mottling posteriorly that may fade again under the tail. The head usually does not have any markings other than a moderately wide postocular stripe that runs from behind the eye back to the angle of the mouth. The irises are gold or bronze, with varying amounts of black reticulation, while the tongue is black.

== Distribution and habitat ==
This species is found in the tropical lowlands of South America east of the Andes, including southeastern Colombia, southern and eastern Venezuela, the island of Trinidad (although some confusion exists regarding the taxonomical systematics of this population), Guyana, Suriname, French Guiana, eastern Ecuador, eastern Peru, Panama, northern Bolivia, and the northern half of Brazil. The type locality is listed as "Asia", which is obviously a mistake. Schmidt and Walker (1943:295) proposed this be corrected to "Surinam".

Despite the vast destruction of rain forests, it is among the most numerous and common of pit vipers and is not endangered. In Trinidad, it prefers wet forests from sea level to 940 m (3,080 ft). Along with Bothrops caribbaeus and B. lanceolatus, it is one of three Bothrops species found in the West Indies.

== Behavior ==
Although generally terrestrial, it is also an excellent swimmer and even climbs trees when necessary to reach prey. Generally nocturnal, it may forage at any time of the day, though, if necessary. These snakes are also easily agitated.

== Feeding ==
Their main diet includes mostly small mammals (such as rodents and opossums) and birds, but also frogs, lizards, smaller snakes, fish, crayfish, centipedes, and tarantulas. Larger prey is struck and released, after which it is tracked down by its scent trail.

== Reproduction ==
Bothrops atrox can give live birth to up to 80 offspring at once. Adults breed year-round. After mating, females with developing embryos travel in and out of sunlight to keep themselves and the embryos at a constant temperature. In equatorial regions, the gestation period is about three to four months, with an average of 60 young per litter. At birth, the young are about 30 cm (12 in) in total length, more brightly colored than adults, and have yellow or beige tails.

Three species of the Neotropical pit viper Bothrops atrox group were confirmed to undergo facultative parthenogenesis on the basis of captivity information and by the use of molecular markers (heterologous microsatellites). Infertile eggs, non-viable ova and malformed offspring were frequent in those cases.

== Venom ==
These snakes are known to search for rodents in coffee and banana plantations. Workers there are often bitten by the snakes, which can lie camouflaged for hours, nearly undetectable, and strike with high speed.

Their venom is hemorrhagic, damaging the vascular endothelium and consuming coagulation factors in a mechanism known as venom-induced consumption coagulopathy. As a result, clotting assays such as prothrombin time and aPTT will be highly disturbed. Spontaneous recovery from coagulopathy is seen 14 to 30 hours after bite according to a study performed in French Guiana. A Mexican polyvalent antivenom was tested, but had no effect on it. B. atrox venom can result in several systemic and local symptoms, such as severe bleeding, kidney failure, abnormal clotting, blisters, and necrosis. The bite can also result in hemorrhage in the central nervous system, which leads to sequelae and even death. In a case reported in the Brazilian Amazon, symptoms such as pain and ecchymoses, headaches, nausea, vomiting, diarrhea, hypertension, and blood incoagulability were reported, the patient died of stroke, even after administration of the antivenom. The common lancehead has an LD_{50} of 1.1 to 4.9 mg/kg; the venom of juveniles is more inflammatory, lethal, and hemorrhagic, and kills more quickly than that of adults. People bitten by neonates are more likely to develop coagulopathy.

Venom yield averages 124 milligrams (1.91 gr), although it may be as much as 342 milligrams (5.28 gr). The enzyme reptilase (batroxobin), derived from this snake's venom, is used in modern medical laboratories to measure fibrinogen levels and blood coagulation capability. The test is considered to be a replacement for thrombin time, and is used when heparin is present in the sample. The enzyme is unaffected by heparin.
