= Xnaheb =

Archaeological site in Belize

Coordinates: 16.3167°N 88.8°W

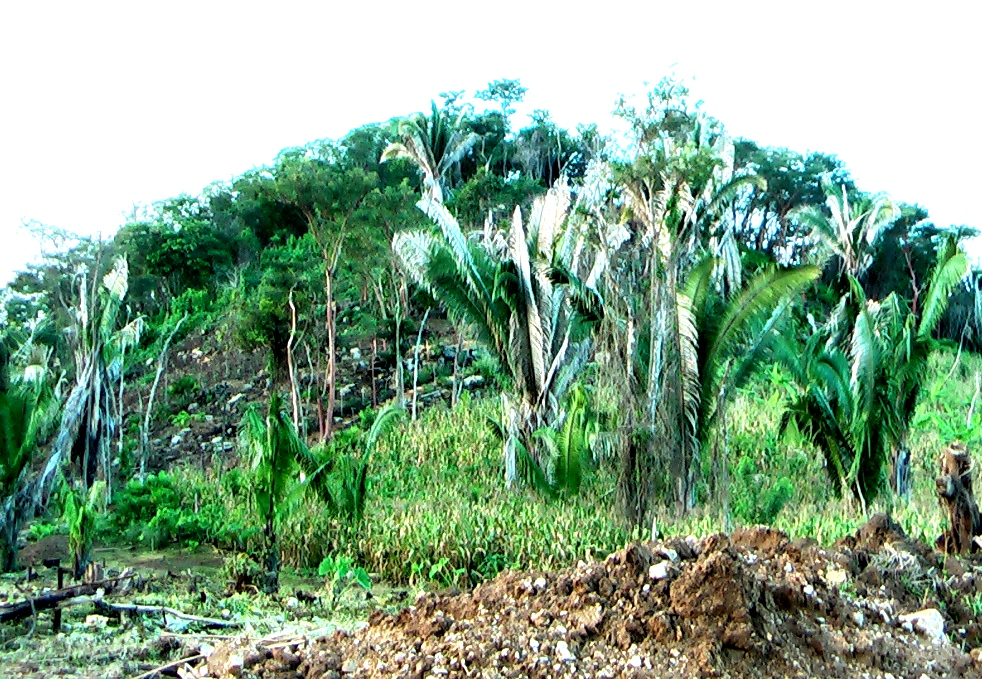
Xnaheb

Xnaheb is an archaeological site of the pre-Columbian Maya civilization, one of five primary sites identified in the southern Belize region. The center is built on a ridge of foothills that extends from the Maya Mountains, in what is now the Toledo District of Belize. Based on certain architectural similarities between the two sites, it is possible that Xnaheb was founded as an offshoot of Nim Li Punit.

== See also ==
- Lubaantun
