= Coat of arms of Martinique =

Martinique, a région and overseas département of France in the Caribbean, has historically used a coat of arms with four white fer-de-lance vipers since 4 August 1766. However, the coat of arms has become controversial due to its association with the territory's history of slavery, and its use has been discouraged by local Martinicans. The Regional Assembly has adopted a distinctive logo to represent the Territorial Collectivity of Martinique.

== Coat of arms ==
Coat of arms of Martinique
- Adopted: 4 August 1766

The coat of arms of Martinique is based on the island of Martinique's controversial snake flag which features a white cross on a blue field with a white fer-de-lance viper (Bothrops lanceolatus) in each corner. The symbol was first used following a 4 August 1766 edict specifying that vessels of the French colony of Martinique and Saint Lucia should fly a version of the French ensign—which at the time was a white cross on a blue field—with L-shaped (for Lucia) snakes in each quarter of the cross. The controversy comes as those vessels were active participants in the Trans-Atlantic Slave Trade with locals highly discouraging the use of the flag, and by extension the coat of arms.

In October 2018, the National Gendarmerie directorate in Martinique stopped using the emblem by order of President Emmanuel Macron.

== Logo ==
Emblem of the Territorial Collectivity of Martinique

The Territorial Collectivity of Martinique has adopted a logo to represent itself. The logo was adopted on 1 August 2016, following a design competition opene to all people of age living in Martinique. Out of 647 eligible proposals, a design by 22-year-old graphic artist Stévy Desbonnes was selected. The logo features a hummingbird whose wings form a stylized map of Martinique. The ochre colour represents the local soil and the blue represents the ocean.

== See also ==
- Flag of Martinique
