= Flag of Martinique =

Martinique
- Rouge-vert-noir
- Use: Civil and state flag
- Proportion: 2:3
- Adopted: 2 February 2023
- Design: Two equal horizontal bands of green (top) and black with a red triangle based at the hoist.

The flag of Martinique consists of a red triangle at the hoist, with two horizontal bands, the upper green and the lower black. It was adopted on 2 February 2023. The flag, known as the rouge-vert-noir ("red-green-black"), uses the pan-African colours. The flag of France, its parent country, is also flown with official standing due to Martinique's status as a French overseas department and region. The assembly of Martinique flies a flag with the collectivity's logo on it to represent the government.

== 2022 flag consultation ==
Prior to 2023, Martinique did not have its own official flag. In 2018, the local council held a competition to create a flag and anthem for the island, but two and a half years following the presentation of the winners, the flag and anthem were annulled by the local administrative tribunal, as the method of their selection was not deemed within the responsibilities of the council. In 2022, the island began a public vote on an official flag and anthem, which shared the same ties to the motherland of Africa. However, turnout for the first phase, which narrowed the choices down to two options, was very low, with only 19,084 voting for a flag and 9,294 for the anthem out of an eligible population of around 300,000. The winners, announced 16 January 2023, were the hummingbird design for the flag and "Ansanm" for the anthem, representing 72.84% and 53.76% of votes cast, respectively. During the second round of voting, turnout remained relatively low, with a total of 26,633 votes cast for a flag, and 10,289 votes cast for an anthem.

After the winning flag was announced, a controversy arose over the design of a hummingbird on the flag appearing to be identical in shape to one present on the Shutterstock website. The designer, Anaïs Delwaulle, initially defended her use of the stock image and her design in general, but on 23 January announced that she wanted her design withdrawn from the process. The president of the Executive Council accepted this withdrawal, and explained that as a result, the runner-up – the nationalist flag – would be submitted to the Assembly for consideration on 2–3 February. The runner-up design was eventually adopted on 2 February, with 44 votes in favour and one abstention.

== Flags used ==
=== Red-green-black flag ===
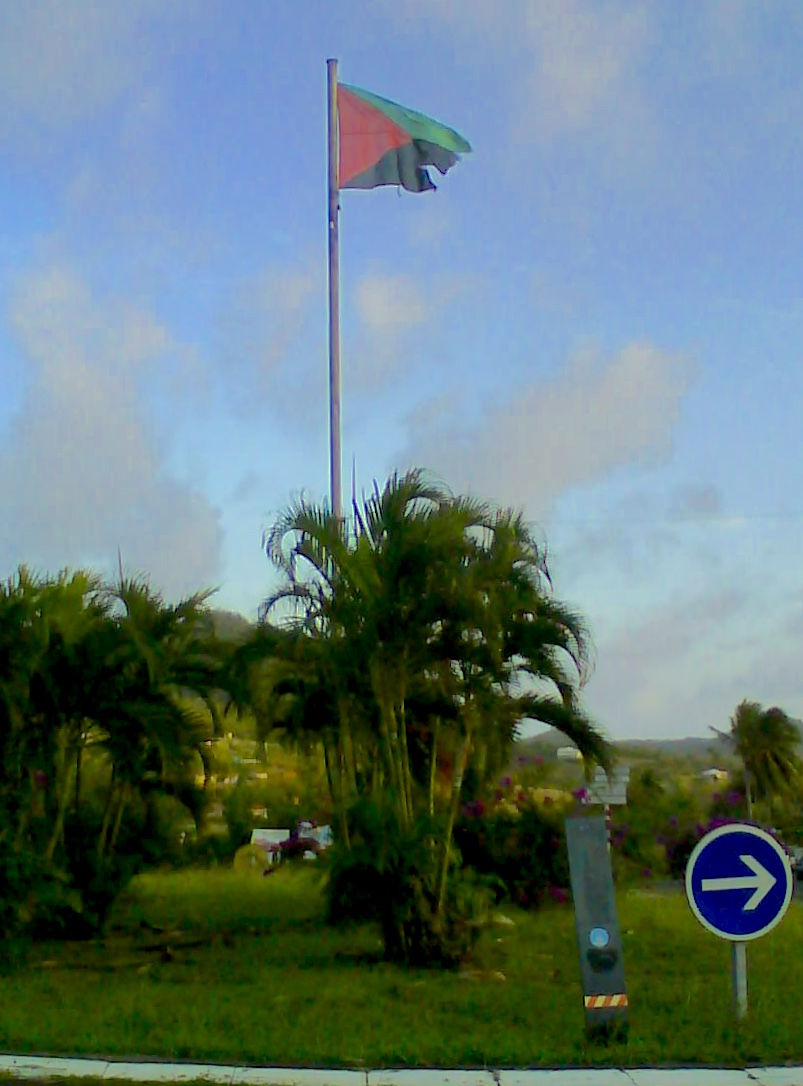
A nationalist Martinique flag in 2008

The rouge-vert-noir ("red-green-black") flag, or "nationalist flag" is the preferred symbol of Martinican independence activists. It was designed by Guy Cabort-Masson and Alex Ferdinand in 1968 and secretly transferred to Martinique in 1971.

The colours of this flag are also found on the pan-African diaspora flag, designed in 1920 meaning:

Red is the color of the blood which men must shed for their redemption and liberty; black is the color of the noble and distinguished race to which we belong; green is the color of the luxuriant vegetation of our Motherland.
—Universal Negro Catechism (1921)

The original proposed design of a flag for Martinique by Victor Lessort was a red, gold, green tricolor of vertical bands similar to the flag of France. These are the pan-African colours popularized by the flag of Ghana. But, a fellow imprisoned OJAM defendant, Rodolphe Desiré, suggested that Lessort substitute black for gold. In an interview, Desiré confirmed that the inspiration for the flag's red, black, green color scheme was Marcus Garvey's pan-African flag of UNIA.

In 1995, it was controversially raised in the town of Sainte-Anne by nationalist mayor Garcin Malsa. The flag was included as one of the options taken to public vote in 2023, along with many other designs using colours derived from this flag, reaching the last round of voting and ultimately second place. However, as the winner withdrew after the results were announced, and it was one of the final two options voted on in the last round of voting, the flag was considered for adoption by the Assembly on 2 February 2023, and was adopted with 44 votes in favour and one abstention.

=== Territorial Collectivity flag ===
Flag of the Territorial Collectivity of Martinique

On 1 August 2016, a design competition for the Territorial Collectivity's logo was opened to all people of age living in Martinique. Out of 647 eligible proposals, a design by 22-year-old graphic artist Stévy Desbonnes was selected. The logo features a hummingbird whose wings form a stylized map of Martinique. The colour ochre represents the local soil and blue represents the ocean.

In late 2016, the local government flag was created, consisting of the new logo on a white background.

=== Ipséité flag (2019–2021) ===
The Ipséité flag

In 2018, the local council launched a competition to create a flag to represent Martinique at international sporting and cultural events. The anthem Lorizon (by Rosetta Varasse) and the flag Ipséité ("Selfhood") were chosen by the president of the Martinique Executive Council, Alfred Marie-Jeanne. They were officially presented on 10 May 2019. On 15 November 2021, the flag and anthem were annulled by the local administrative tribunal, as the method of their selection were not deemed within the responsibilities of the Executive Council. It is still seen as a cultural symbol.

The flag, designed by Johnny Vigne, depicts a lambi, an emblematic shell of the Antilles whose conch is used as a traditional musical instrument. Around it, 34 Amerindian stars symbolize the 34 municipalities of Martinique and eight segments evoke eight of the different languages spoken on the island: French, Creole, English, Spanish, Portuguese, Italian, Chinese and Arabic. The colour blue refers to the Atlantic Ocean and the Caribbean Sea, while green recalls the steep hills and nature of the territory.

The flag was first flown in June 2019 by Martinique's national football team during their participation at the 2019 CONCACAF Gold Cup. In 2021, an administrative court annulled the usage of the flag.

=== Snake flag ===
The snake flag

The "snake flag" (drapeau aux serpents) features a white cross on a blue field with a white fer-de-lance viper (Bothrops lanceolatus), a snake species endemic to the island, in each corner. The symbol dates from an edict issued 4 August 1766, specifying that vessels of the French colony of Martinique and Saint Lucia should fly a version of the French ensign—which at the time was a white cross on a blue field—with L-shaped (for Lucia) snakes in each quarter of the cross. The same design was used for the lesser coat of arms.

In September 2018, Jean-Philippe Nilor, a Martinican member of the National Assembly, demanded its withdrawal from public use, arguing that it was associated with the slave trade. In October 2018, the National Gendarmerie stopped using the emblem by order of President Emmanuel Macron. Before the 21st century, the snake flag was largely unused in Martinique. It was mainly erroneously used as a courtesy ensign by yachters and was not available for sale locally. As of 2026, the snake flag is still used for the flag_mq emoji by Twemoji, Huawei, JoyPixels, LG, Skype, SerenityOS, Toss Face, PlayStation Network, and Icons8, with other providers replacing it with the 2023 flag. The emoji of the flag was sometimes used by the Québécois as a stand in for Quebec's own flag, as there is not yet a Quebec flag emoji.

=== Other flags of Martinique ===
Flag of the Martinican Independence Movement

Flag used by Martinique delegation at international taekwondo tournaments until their flag started to be used

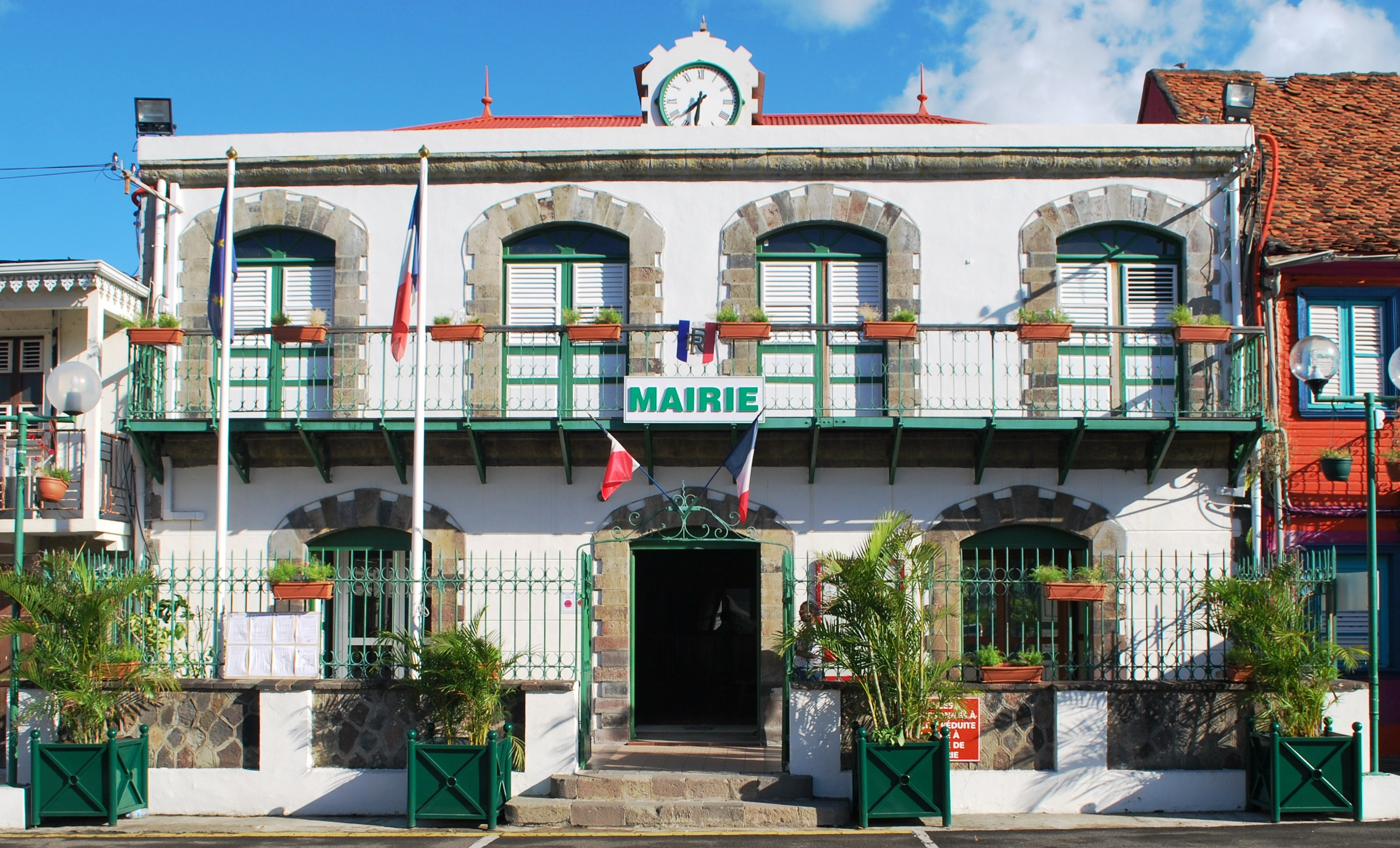
French tricolours at the mairie of Case-Pilote

== See also ==
- Coat of arms of Martinique
- Flags of French regions
