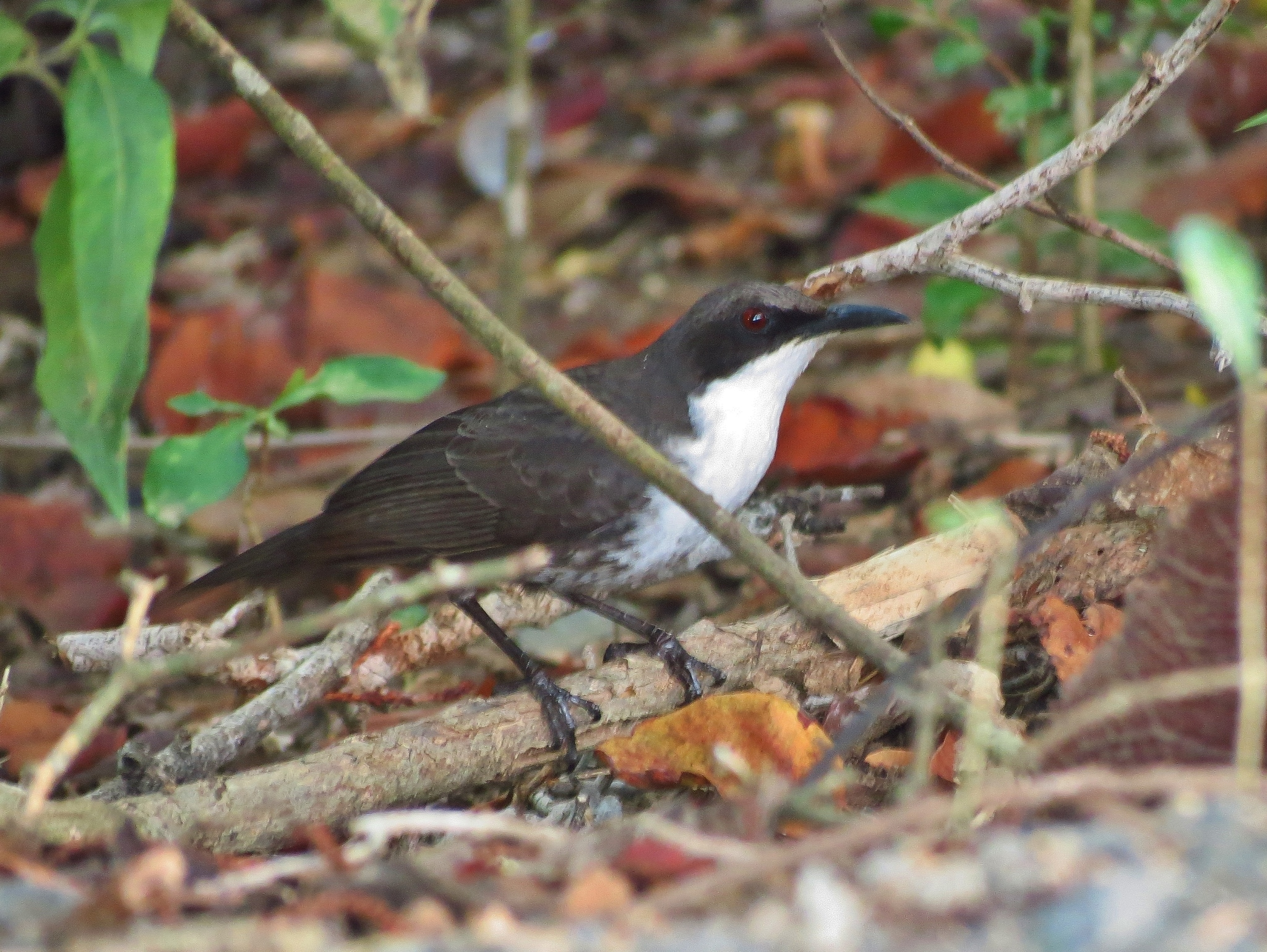
- Martinique thrasher (Ramphocinclus brachyurus)

Scientific classification
- Kingdom: Animalia
- Phylum: Chordata
- Class: Aves
- Order: Passeriformes
- Family: Mimidae
- Genus: Ramphocinclus; Lafresnaye, 1843

= Ramphocinclus =

Genus of birds

Ramphocinclus is a genus of birds in the family Mimidae.

== Species ==
Two species are recognized:

Image	Common name	Scientific name
	Martinique thrasher	Ramphocinclus brachyurus (Vieillot, 1818)
	St. Lucia thrasher	Ramphocinclus sanctaeluciae Cory, 1887
