= Uxbenka =

Ancient Maya archaeological site in Belize

Coordinates: 16.2367°N 89.0783°W

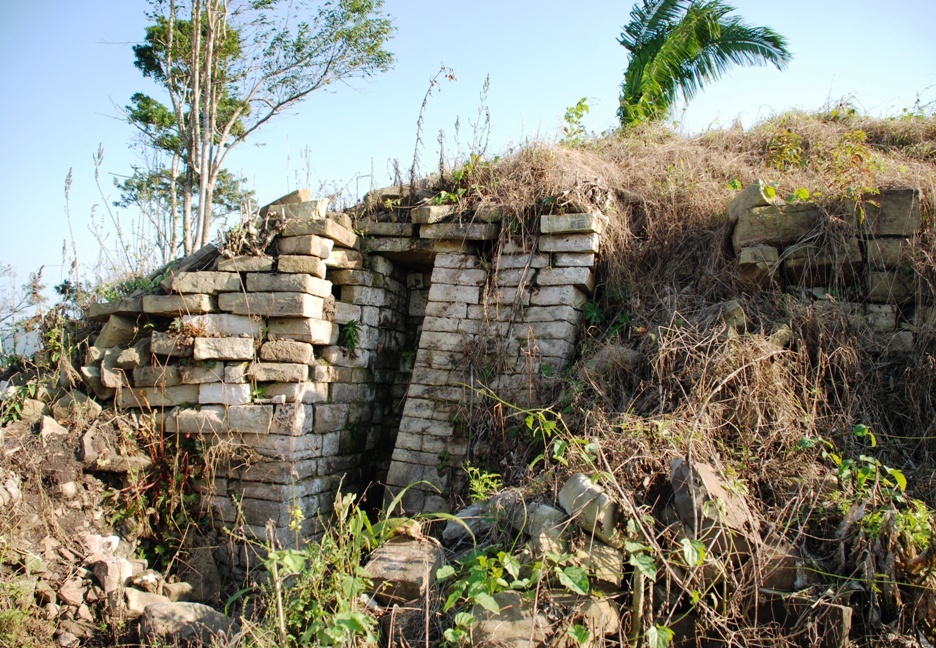
- B Group at Uxbenka
- Interactive map of Uxbenka
- Location: Belize

Uxbenka (or Uxbenká in Spanish orthography) is a pre-Columbian Mesoamerican archaeological site located in Belize's southernmost district of Toledo. An urban settlement of the pre-Columbian Maya, it is the earliest-known Maya polity in the southern Belizean lowlands, with evidence of occupation dating to the Early Classic period of Mesoamerican chronology (ca. 250–500 CE).

It is one of five major Maya sites in this region, whose archaeological sites also include Nim Li Punit and Lubaantun. Settlement of Uxbenka has been suggested to have occurred originally by Peten peoples. The site is approximately 40 square kilometers in size, and Uxbenka is referred to as a medium-sized polity). Uxbenka rose shortly after the expansion of another Maya site, Tikal. The site is thought to have been first inhabited during the late Preclassic period.

== Settlement ==
The residential housing settlements of Uxbenka were very dispersed around the site. Some LiDAR images suggest that the people of Uxbenka utilized and modified the hilltops for public and residential structures. The residential settlements expand about 3 kilometers from the site's core. Two very large public structures characterize the site core.

== Stelae ==
Thirteen stelae (stone slabs which were used to record the political history of ancient Maya sites) have been identified at Uxbenka. Only two stelae remain standing, the remaining having been moved or fallen over. The surviving stelae have gone through natural weathering processes, leaving most of the epigraphic information on the stela to be unreadable. Of the legible ethnographic data found on the surviving stela, a series of long count dates were found. The discovery of these long count dates indicate that Uxbenka was occupied from the Early Classic to the Late Classic period.

Stela 5:

Stela 5 is in front of the northeast corner of Structure 1. The carvings on this stela are deteriorated to the point that archaeologists have not been able to identify what the carvings depicted.

Stela 6:

Stela 6 was found directly in front of Structure 1. This stela is missing its upper half, it appears that its upper half was broken off. Glyphs were found on this stela, which has been dated to the Late Classic period. Of those glyphs, one section reads “Hanab Pakal”, which has been translated to “flower shield”.

Stela 11:

This stela was found in three pieces, positioned face down in the northwest corner of Structure 1. Similarly, to Stela 6, Stela 11 is also missing its upper half. Stela 11 contains some of the more readable glyphs found in Uxbenka, as archaeologists were able to read the complete long count date: “8.18.0.0.” which dates it to the Early Classic period. Additional legible glyphs found on Stela 11 include a jaguar paw similar to one found on Tikal Stela 39. Iconography present on Stela 11 includes the lower half of an individual with both feet pointed in the same direction and a Double-Headed Serpent Bar. This indicated that this stela is from the Early Classic also, as it is a pose consistent with other Early Classic iconography.

Stela 14:

Stela 14 is not only the tallest of the stela at Uxbenka but also, “the tallest monument at Uxbenka”. Most of the inscriptions on Stela 14 were eroded off by natural weathering processes. Faint outlines of a large Late Classic-style witz monster are nevertheless observable.

Stela 15:

Stela 15 was found broken into two pieces in front of Structure 3. Inscriptions on this stela that remain legible include the initial series introductory glyph (ISIG) and a long count date of 9.17.10.0.0, or November 28, 780 A.D.

Stela 18:

This stela was found face down east of Structure 7. Although partly eroded, iconography on Stela 18 is interpreted to show an Early Classic ruler. Faint outlines of inscriptions are seen on Stela 18, but they are too eroded to read

Stela 19:

Stela 19 was found west of the central staircase that lead to the stelae plaza. Inscriptions on this stela are comparatively well preserved, with 35 glyphs legible. A partial long count date and introductory series initial glyph (ISIG) has been identified, translated as 9.17.11 or A.D. 782.

Stela 21:

Originally only the left half of Stela 21 was found, in front of Structure 1 and close to Stela 11. Survey conducted by the Maya Mountains Archaeological Project recovered the right half of Stela 21 in a looter's pit in front of Stela 15 Similarly to Stela 11 and Stela 18, Stela 21 depicts a similar carving of an Early Classic ruler with a Double-Headed Serpent Bar. This craving helps date it to the Early Classic Period.

Stela 22:

Stela 22 was found buried under Stela 13. Six severely eroded glyphs are found on one side of this stela A possible date of A.D. 751 was suggested from a legible “Haab” glyph.

== Agriculture ==
Archaeological research suggests that the soils around Uxbenka are high in nutrients, making the area propitious for agricultural production. Slash-and-burn and milpa agricultural techniques were used by the inhabitants of Uxbenka, along with soil management strategies like terracing. Terracing utilizes hillsides to combat soil erosion and make use of available land resources.
