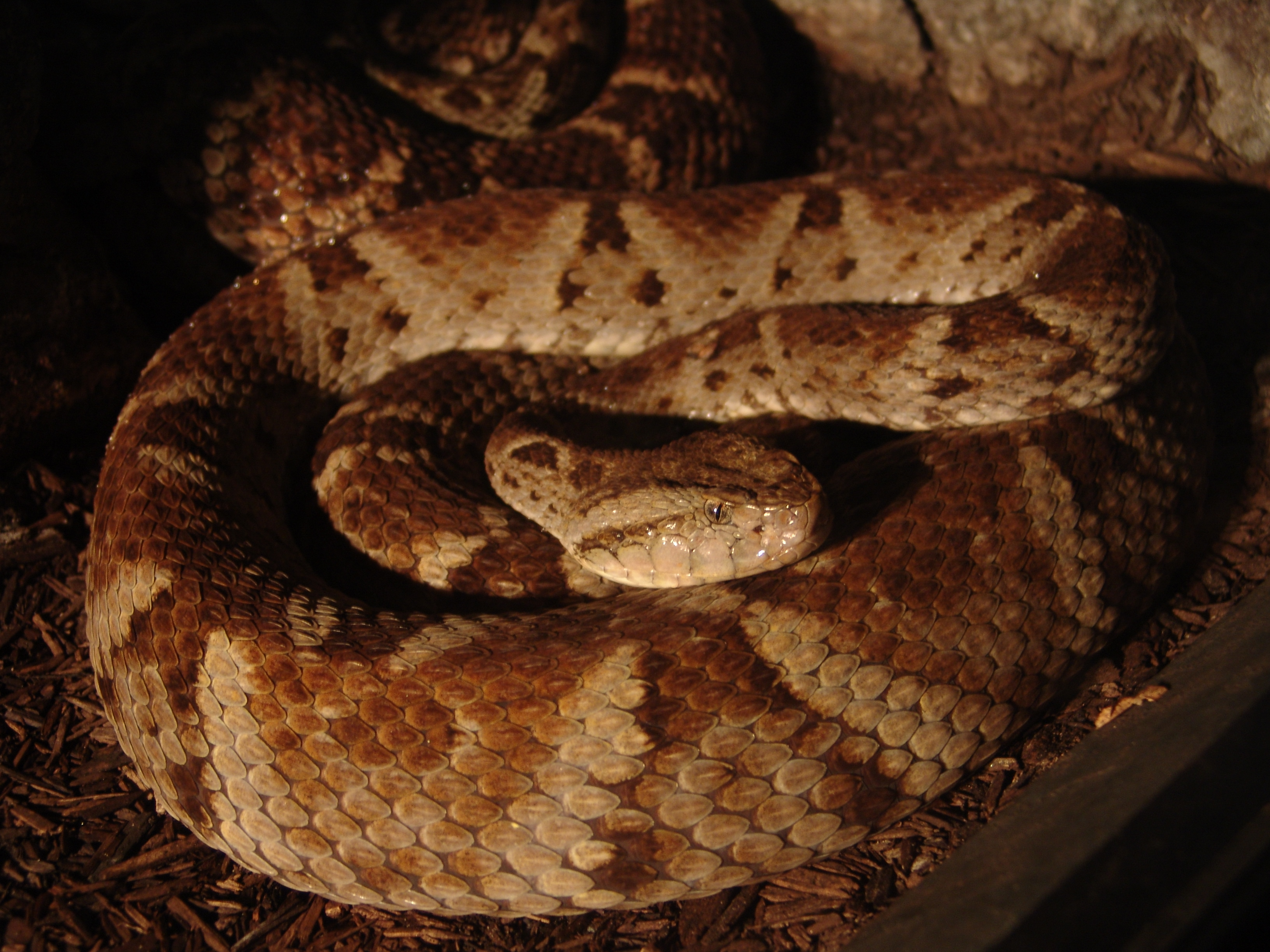

Conservation status
- Least Concern (IUCN 3.1)

Scientific classification
- Kingdom: Animalia
- Phylum: Chordata
- Class: Reptilia
- Order: Squamata
- Suborder: Serpentes
- Family: Viperidae
- Genus: Bothrops
- Species: B. leucurus

Binomial name
- Bothrops leucurus Wagler, 1824

Synonyms
- Bothrops leucurus Wagler, 1824; Bothrops Megaera Wagler, 1824; Trimeresurus pradoi Hoge, 1948; Bothrops leucurus — Fenwick et al., 2009

= Bothrops leucurus =

Species of snake

Bothrops leucurus, commonly known as the whitetail lancehead or the Bahia lancehead, is a species of venomous snake, a pit viper in the family Viperidae. The species is endemic to Brazil. There are no subspecies which are recognized as being valid. A female owned by YouTuber Venom Central is over six feet long.

== Etymology ==
The specific name, leucurus, meaning "whitetail", is from the Latin words leucus (white) and urus (tail).

The specific name, pradoi, of the junior synonym Trimeresurus pradoi, is in honor of Brazilian herpetologist Alcides Prado.

== Description and Behavior ==
The color varies from tan to reddish-brown, the pattern varies, from darker and lighter spots, similar to light diagonal dorsolateral lines. It has 23 to 31 rows of dorsal scale of the medium body, the belly is yellowish or whitish in color with dark, brown or gray spots, and irregular spots on the sides. It is a snake with terrestrial behavior, growing on average in 250–1840 mm, mainly found in forests, arid, semi-arid, dry, humid and sub-humid regions.

== Geographic range ==
Bothrops leucurus is found in eastern Brazil along the Atlantic coast from northern Espírito Santo north to Alagoas and Ceará. It occurs more inland in several parts of Bahia. The identity of disjunct populations west of the Rio São Francisco is uncertain. The type locality is listed as "provinciae Bahiae". It inhabits both urban and rural areas.

== Reproduction ==
Bothrops leucurus is viviparous. The gestation period is four months, and a medium-sized litter is 19 young, birth occurs between winter and summer.

== Diet ==
It feeds on rodents, lizards, amphibians, snakes and birds (Martins et al., 2002). with adults feeding on rodents, and juveniles feeding on frogs and lizards.

== Venom ==
The whitetail lancehead is responsible for the most bites in the state of Bahia. The venom contains high fibrinolytic, proteolytic, hemorrhagic and edematogenic activity, and low coagulant activity, which can cause myonecrosis in humans. Symptoms include local pain, edema, erythema and ecchymosis (local symptoms), hemorrhagic and coagulation symptoms, digestive disorders (nausea, vomiting and diarrhea), urinary disorders (oliguria, anuria, hematuria) with headaches, dizziness, hypotension, bradycardia, visual disturbances and tremors.
