= Nim Li Punit =

Archaeological site in Belize

Coordinates: 16°19′N 88°48′W

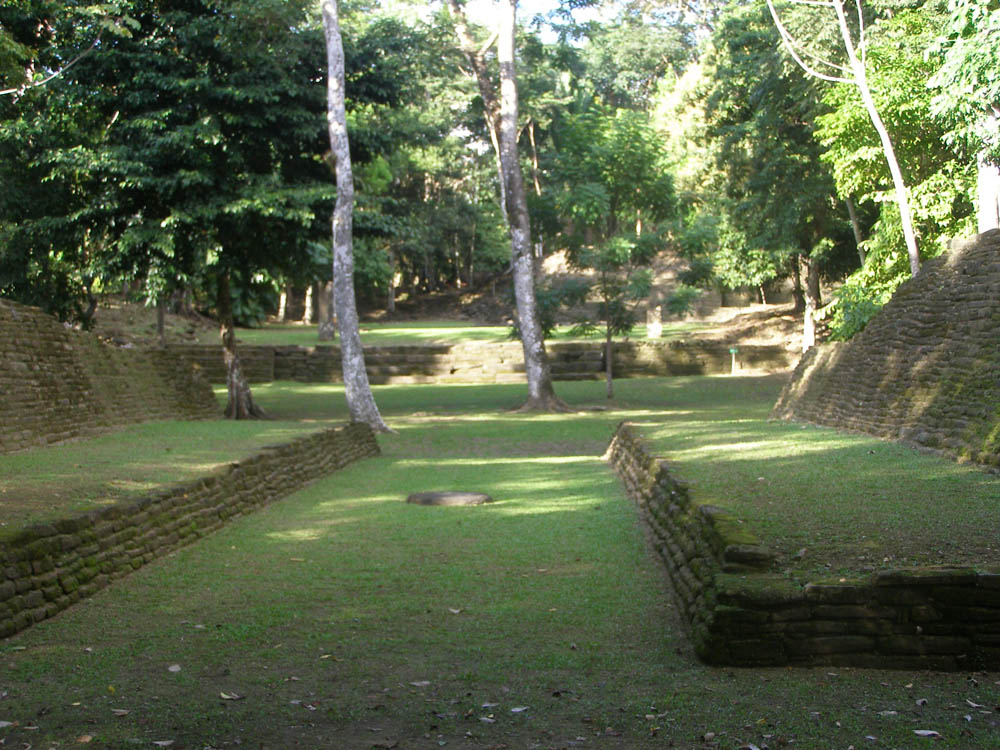
- Ballcourt at Nim Li Punit Mayan ruins.
- Interactive map of Nim Li Punit
- Location: Belize

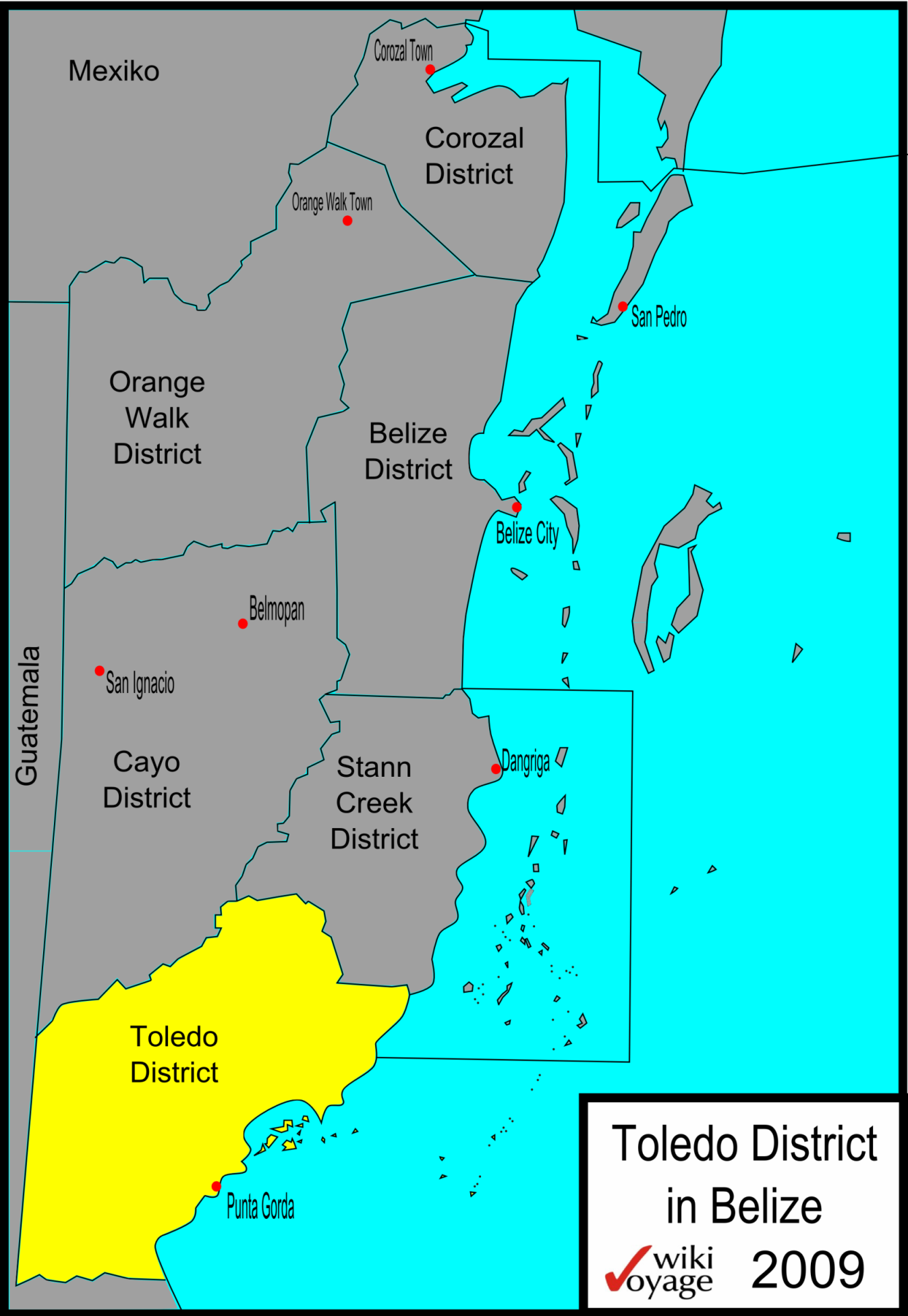
Map showing the Toledo District of Belize and its capital Punta Gorda.

Nim Li Punit (/nim li puˈnit/) is a Maya Classic Period site in the Toledo District of the nation of Belize, located 50 kilometres north of the town of Punta Gorda, and directly adjacent to the village of Indian Creek. Nim Li Punit is sometimes known as Big Hat or Top Hat; the name is Kekchi Maya for "Big Hat", referring to the large elaborate head-dress on a stela sculpture found on site depicting one of the site's ancient kings. It is bordered by the Maya Mountains to the west and lowland swamps and the Caribbean Sea to the east.

Nim Li Punit is a medium-sized site from the Maya Classic Period, flourishing from the 5th century AD through the 8th century AD. It consists of structures around three plazas, including several step-pyramids, the tallest being 11 meters high. It was populated in the Maya Classic Period and reached a maximum population of around 7000 residents, but was rapidly abandoned when the Maya civilization began to decline. There was extensive trade throughout the region in goods such as obsidian during this period. In addition to trade, fertile soils in the area helped in the success of the settlement. Archaeological exploration of Nim li Punit began in 1976, though the site was already known to locals.

== Geography and geology ==
Nim Li Punit is situated in the foothills of the Maya Mountains in close proximity to multiple mountain streams. The Maya Mountains form a nearly impenetrable backdrop of forest to the north and west, while the expansive somewhat swampy coastal lowlands adjoining the Caribbean Sea lie to the east. Low-lying swampland between the Sarstoon and Temash Rivers is situated to the south. The site is within two kilometres of Belize's Southern Highway, accessed by an unpaved road. (The Southern Highway itself is paved in the vicinity of the site). Area soils are relatively fertile for tropical standards, and explain the region's ability to support sizeable indigenous settlements such as Nim Li Punit. Local sandstones are found in nearby stream and river beds, and these materials were used as the principal building stones for the site's structures and stelae. The Maya Mountains and foothills are among the oldest surface rock formations of Central America; these Paleozoic sediments were uplifted about 200 million years ago in the late Carboniferous (Pennsylvanian) and Early Permian periods.

== Economy and trade ==
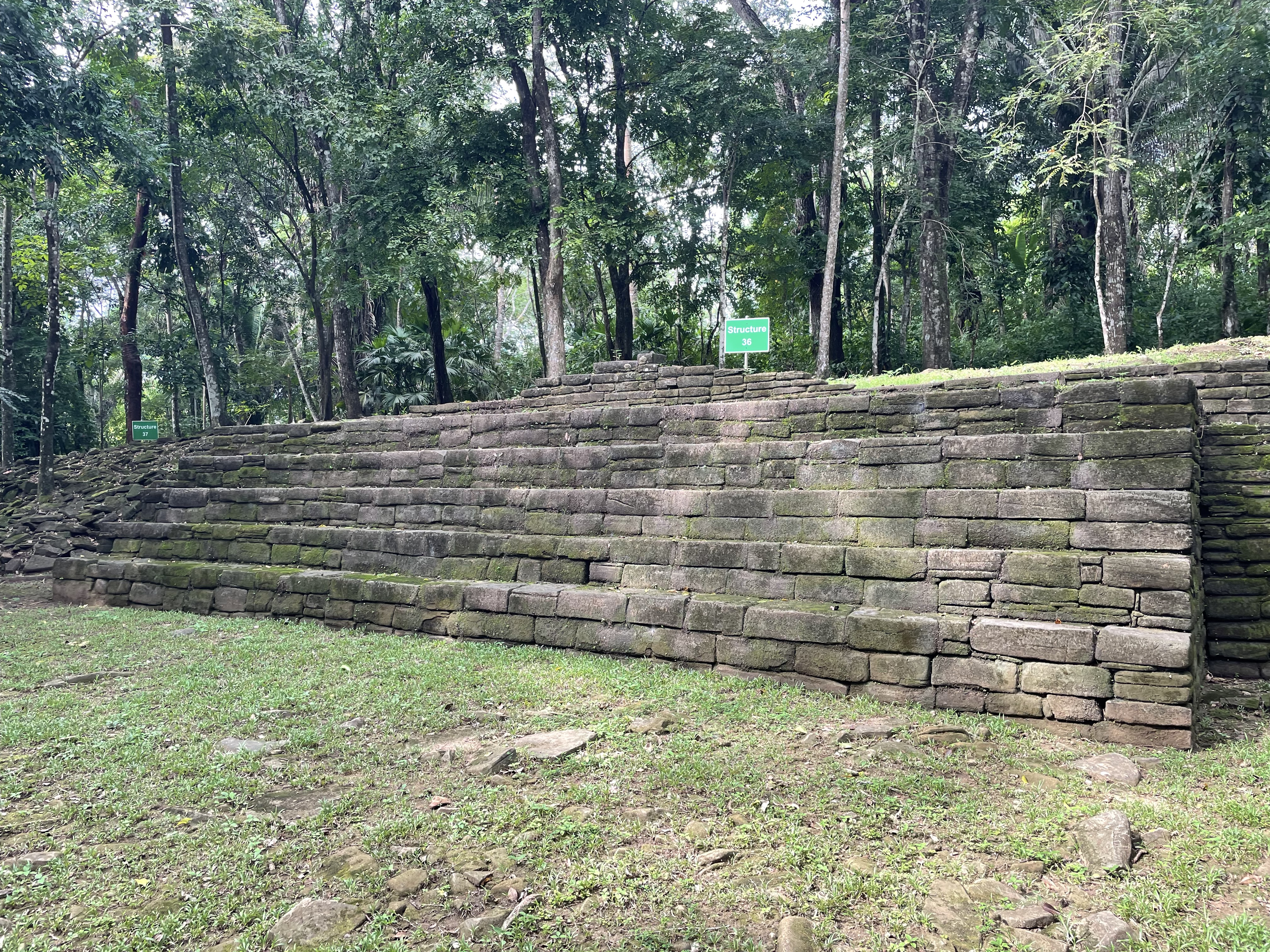
Stone steps leading to a grassy terrace at Nim li Punit.

In addition to Nim li Punit, the Maya Mountains of Southern Belize contain four major Maya archaeological sites- Xnaheb, Lubaantun, Uxbenka, and Pusilha. All these sites are in close proximity to one another, with the farthest site from Nim li Punit, Pushilha, being only 47 kilometers to the southwest. Despite their close geographic proximity, the extent of the economic and political relationships between Nim li Punit and these other polities is still debated, and scholars remain unsure of what allowed them all to thrive so close to one another. Archaeologists have used goods with economic value in Maya culture discovered at Nim li Punit have to draw conclusions on the extent to which these interactions occurred.

One of these goods that has been extensively uncovered at Nim li Punit is obsidian. Obsidian was used to denote status in the Maya Classic Period and was available primarily to royalty. An analysis of obsidian artifacts from Nim li Punit and Lubaantun, revealed that the majority of the obsidian they received originated from El Chayal and Ixtepeque, which are both located in present-day Guatemala. Compared to Lubaantun, Nim li Punit received around twice as much obsidian from Ixtepeque. The ratio of the total mass of obsidian compared to the total mass of pottery was also approximately twice as high at Nim li Punit than at Lubaantun. Overall, obsidian was more abundant at Nim li Punit than other nearby settlements.

== Architecture ==
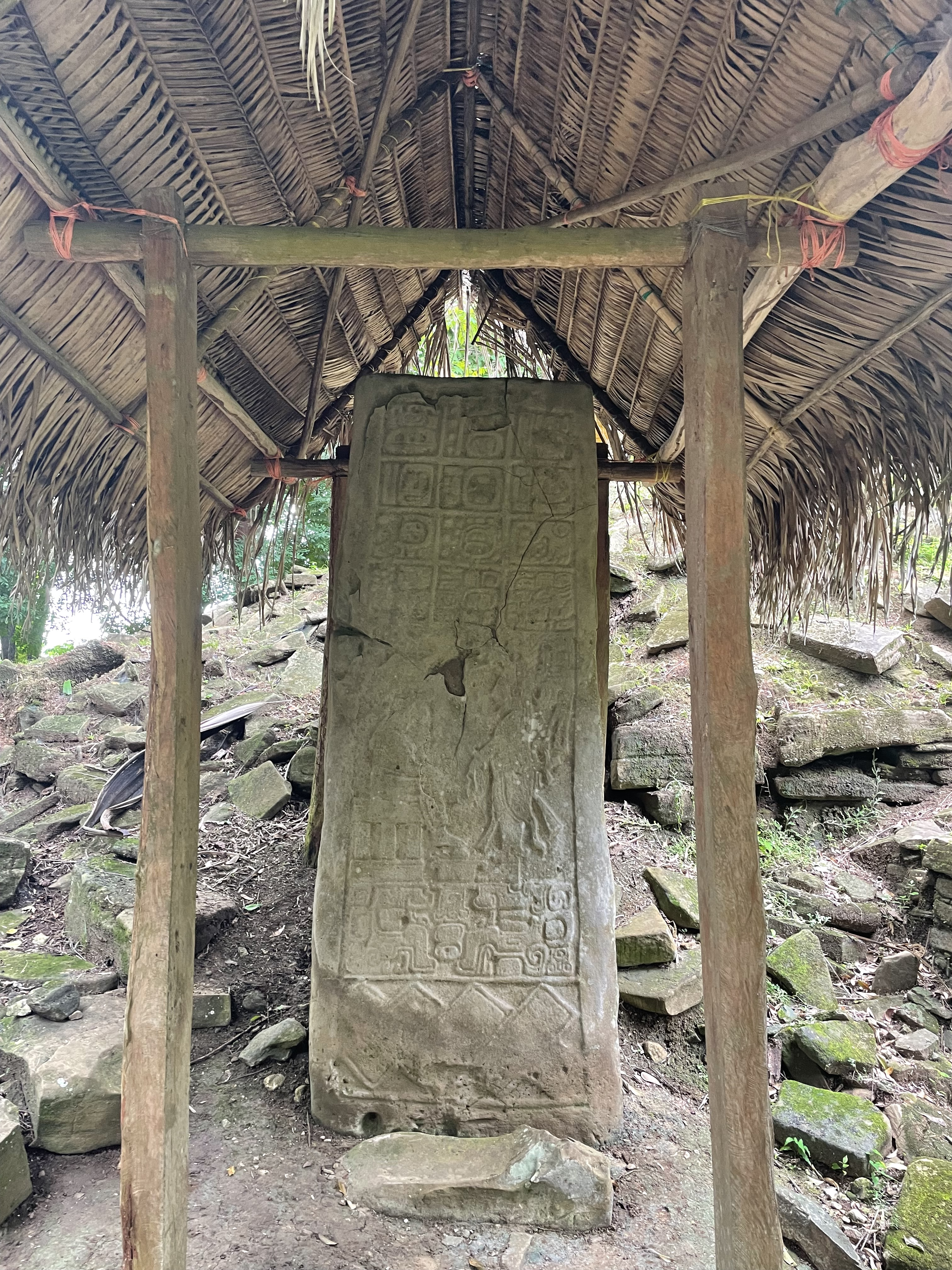
Stele under a thatch palm roof at Nim li Punit.

The ancient city of Nim Li Punit was laid out in a fashion consistent with other Maya lowland Classic Era sites, such as Lubaantun, Pusilha and Uxbenka; the latter two of these sites are deemed to have arisen earlier than the former two. Nim Li Punit is constructed in the Classic Period prototypical geometric form, using large amounts of fill material to achieve expansive plazas and terraces.

It is thought that within the Plaza of the Stela in the South Group that there is an E Group geometry that would have been used for astronomical observations. For example, several monuments present before a long terrace known as Structure One, which mark the location of solstices and equinoxes. Unlike Lubaantun, where dry-stone construction was employed, the stone structures are cemented with Maya mortar; moreover, the elaborate notched jointing often found in Lubaantun is absent in Nim Li Punit.

== Population and occupation ==
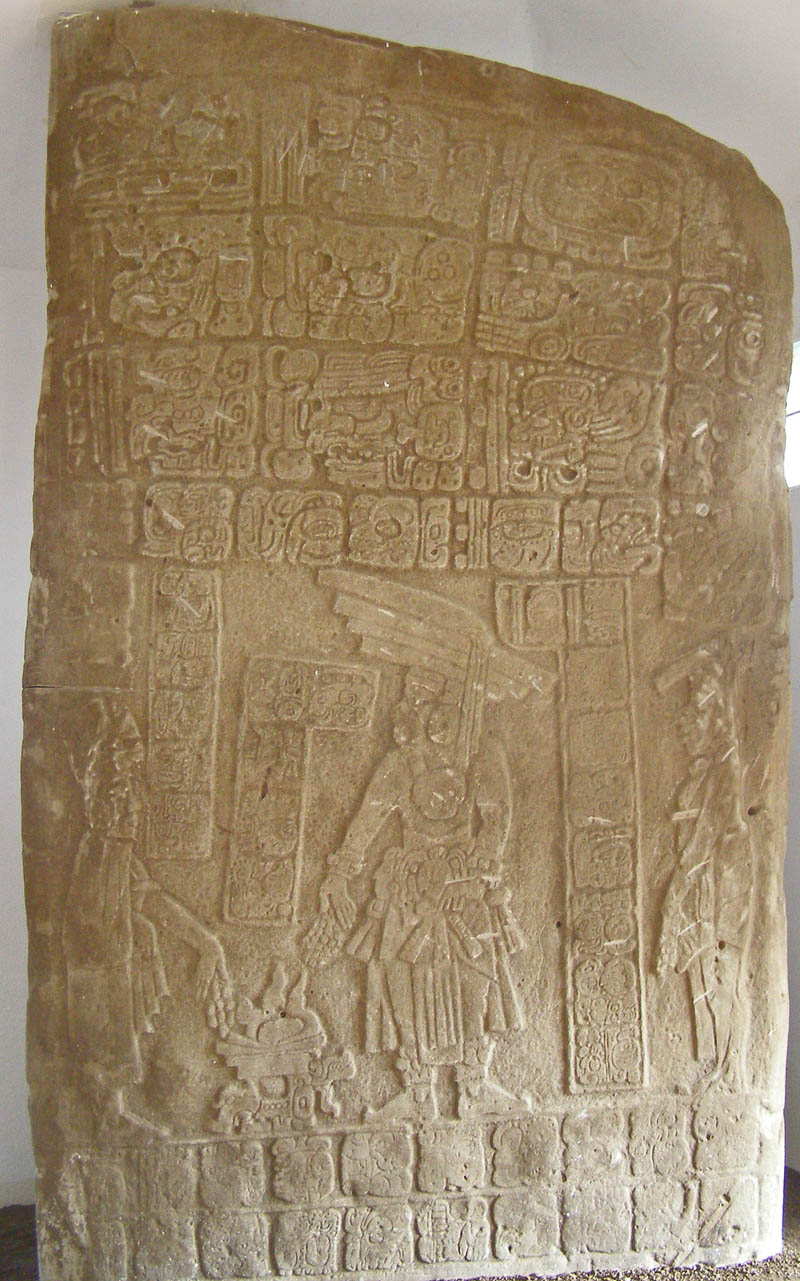
Stela with ruler with large head-dress or "Big Hat", namesake of Nim Li Punit

The peak population of Nim Li Punit is estimated to have been in the range of 5000 to 7000 people during the peak occupation Late Classic period. Early residents of this site probably migrated from Guatemala, similar to the history of nearby Lubaantun. The peoples of Nim Li Punit are thought to have spoken a dialect of the Cholan language, commonly spoken in the Maya heartland. Evidence from carved stelae document that the site was active in the period 721 to 790 AD, based upon actual Maya calendar dates inscribed on at least six different stones. As at many other Maya sites, occupation of Nim Li Punit ceased rather suddenly in the 9th century AD, probably associated with areawide overpopulation exceeding the region's carrying capacity of the then prevalent milpa farming system. The Nim Li Punit population is thought to have aligned with Maya settlements such as Tikal in the Petén Basin region of Guatemala.

== Ecology ==
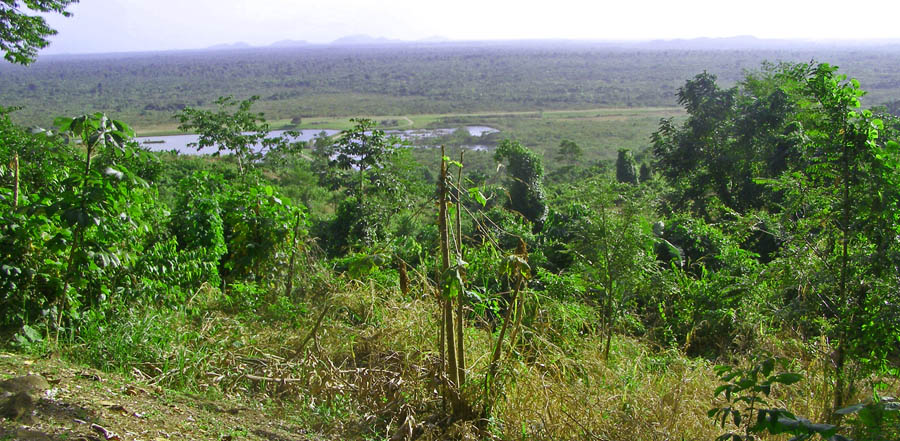
View from southwest edge of Nim Li Punit core looking southwest.

Nim Li Punit is situated in a locale rich in forest, soil, rock and other natural resources. These assets, coupled with proximity to ample flowing mountain streams, provided the indigenous Maya at Nim Li Punit a resource base that allowed their civilization to thrive. While most of the surrounding broadleaf tropical rainforest is secondary growth, due to the disturbance of the Maya themselves, there is considerable biodiversity of trees, herbs, mammals, birds, reptiles and other life forms. In addition to the soils being able to support staple crops such as beans and corn, there are a diversity of herbs in the vicinity known to have been used for medicinal purposes.

Mammals found in the area include two primate species: The Yucatán black howler monkey, Alouatta pigra and Central American spider monkey, Ateles geoffroya. Numerous rodents are found here including the common paca, Agouti paca. A variety of carnivores are present, such as the cougar Puma concolor and jaguar Panthera onca. Hosts of bats frequent the forest as well.

== Archaeology and excavation ==
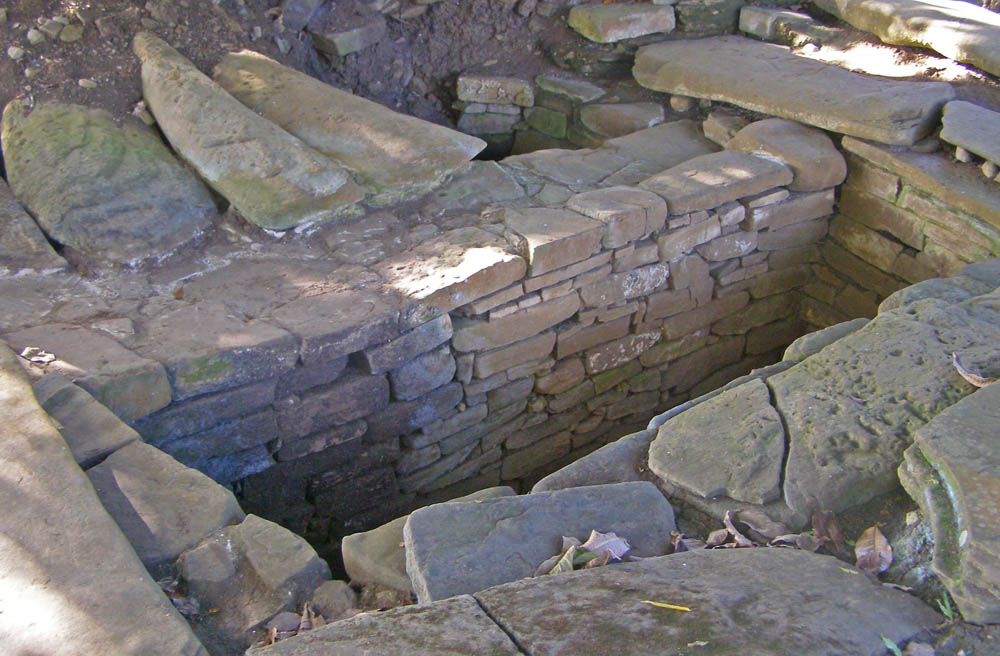
Open tomb at Nim Li Punit

Nim Li Punit was first investigated by archaeologists from outside of Belize in 1976, through research conducted by Norman Hammond of the British Museum-Cambridge University, though site had been known to local Maya people well before this date. Hammond produced the first site map and excavated a portion of the central plaza. Barbara McLeod of the University of Texas, Austin, then produced the first detailed analyses of stelae inscriptions. Richard Levanthal in 1983 bored test pits and surveyed the site as part of an overall southern Belize Maya mapping project. In the 1990s minor excavations were conducted by the Belize Department of Archaeology under the supervision of John Morris and Juan Luis Bonor. In 2015, tomb excavations were conducted by the Toledo Regional Interaction Project directed by Geoffrey Braswell. This excavation unearthed numerous clay pots and a large jade pendant inscribed with Mayan hieroglyphs.

== See also ==
- Lubaantun
- Manche Ch'ol
- Xnaheb
