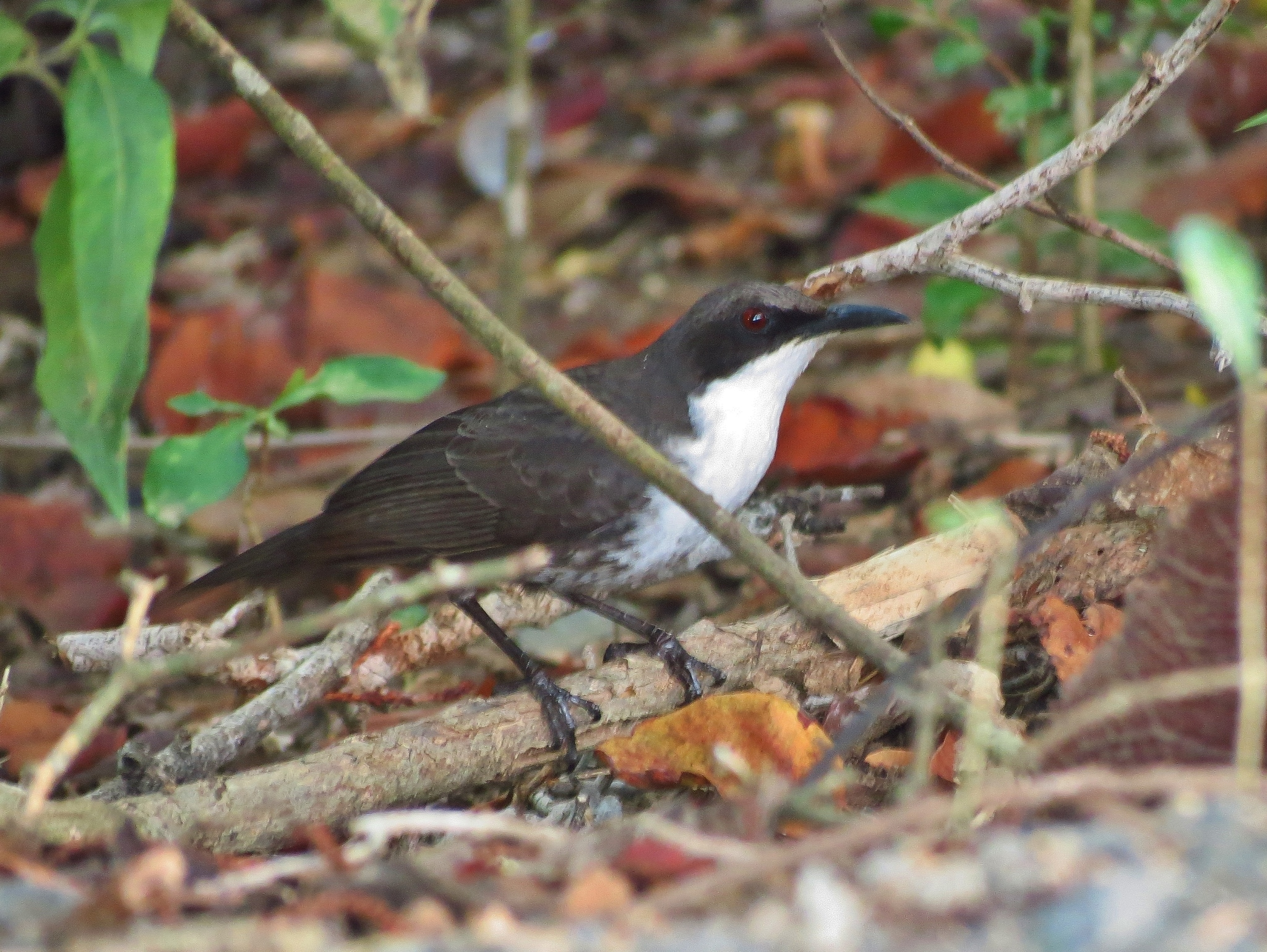
- In Martinique

Conservation status
- Endangered (IUCN 3.1)

Scientific classification
- Kingdom: Animalia
- Phylum: Chordata
- Class: Aves
- Order: Passeriformes
- Family: Mimidae
- Genus: Ramphocinclus
- Species: R. brachyurus

Binomial name
- Ramphocinclus brachyurus (Vieillot, 1818)

= Martinique thrasher =

Species of bird

The Martinique thrasher (Ramphocinclus brachyurus) is a species of bird in the family Mimidae. Semper and Sclater (1872) describe the white-breasted thrasher as an "inquisitive and noisy bird" that would often "keep up a constant warning chatter, and throw itself about in all sorts of contortions" when being disturbed. It is endemic to Martinique. This resident species is easy to find within its range; however, it is classified as endangered by the IUCN Red List of Threatened Species mainly due to its restricted habitat.

== Description ==
The Martinique thrasher is in average 23 to 25 cm long, and weight from 48 to 60 g depending on sex. An adult bird has a dark brown plumage with a white throat, breast, and belly. Its dark beak is long and slightly decurved towards the tip. Several dark bristles are located around the lores, between the red eyes and nostrils of the bird. This medium-sized passerine has long and strong black legs and can live up to 7–8 years. Males and females are sexually monomorphic, thus identical in size and coloration. This bird is difficult to sex by hand or sight due to sexual monomorphism. Males and females have the same plumage and only breeding females can be identified during breeding season by their brood patch.

The plumage of an immature Martinique thrasher is uniformly brown, with a brown throat and a greyish belly. The white patch on its breast will develop with age, around a month later. When the bird is in its first year, it can be differentiated to an adult bird by the rusty brown colour of its upper-parts, and its brownish eye color.

== Taxonomy ==
The Martinique thrasher belongs to the Ramphocinclus, of which it was formerly the only species until the two subspecies of white-breasted thrasher were split into distinct species in 2024..

== Habitat and distribution ==
=== Distribution ===
Because the Martinique thrasher is endemic to Martinique, its range is dangerously small for species survival. Its habitat is restricted to a 5 km^2, now protected, area called the Caravelle Peninsula.

=== Habitat ===
The Martinique thrasher prefers deciduous tropical dry forests and shrub lands.

The semi wooded habitats carefully selected by this habitat specialist must be located within 2 km of the coast, and up to 200 m above sea level. Low canopy shrubs and clear spaces are avoided by both subspecies because of predation, especially during breeding. Soils with an abundant leaf-litter are also favoured for feeding.

== Behaviour ==
=== Diet ===
The Martinique thrasher's diet is adaptable and goes from animal proteins to fruits. Feeding habits depend on what's available to the bird according to environmental conditions. Martinique thrashers are ground eaters. They forage mainly on leaf litter fauna, looking for insects or berries. They also have the ability to regurgitate a whole berry and spit out seeds to save it for a later meal.

=== Predators ===
Because Martinique thrashers are ground-foraging birds, they are mostly vulnerable to small mammals attacks, but they are also often victim of egg predation. Its predators are rats (Rattus rattus), the introduced small Indian mongoose and cats (Felis silverstris catus).

=== Vocalization ===
Vocalization repertoire of the Martinique thrasher is limited which is surprising for a species that belongs to Mimids. The Martinique thrashers often vocalize short and harsh calls, and sometimes a musical "tee-rou". Alarm calls are a "grok grok". They are used between birds to warn each other when a threat is perceived. Juveniles are located by thin "tseep" calls.

=== Reproduction ===
The Martinique thrasher's breeding season starts mid-April and lasts until the end of September. A breeding bird can have up to four successive broods in one breeding season and the average clutch size varies from 1 to 3 eggs. Birds usually live in pairs and build voluminous nests in high trees from 1.5 to 5 m above the ground. Before using a nest, a pair of birds usually build several of them. Each individual takes turn in nest-building tasks. For instance, each bird sits in the nest, in turns, to adjust the inside part of it. Martinique thrashers are thus called cooperative breeders.

Because of egg predation, nesting failure is relatively high and Martinique thrashers use an anti-predatory strategy that consists of keeping their nests clean of eggshells and fecal sacs to reduce nest detection.

== Conservation status ==
The Martinique thrasher total population is estimated at 133-267 individuals and is ranked as "endangered" according to the IUCN Red List. The rate of decline of the population has largely increased due to habitat loss. The Martinique thrasher is able to coexist with some of its predators such as rats and mongooses. However, this predation places an additional burden on the already small thrasher population, especially where rats and mongooses are more abundant. That is why organizations charged with environmental protection have started several programs such as rat extermination, a mongoose capture program, and also a program aimed at monitoring the reproduction success of the R. b. brachyurus (in which one of the tasks consists of fixing plastic bottles on nesting trees trunks, preventing predators from reaching the nest).
