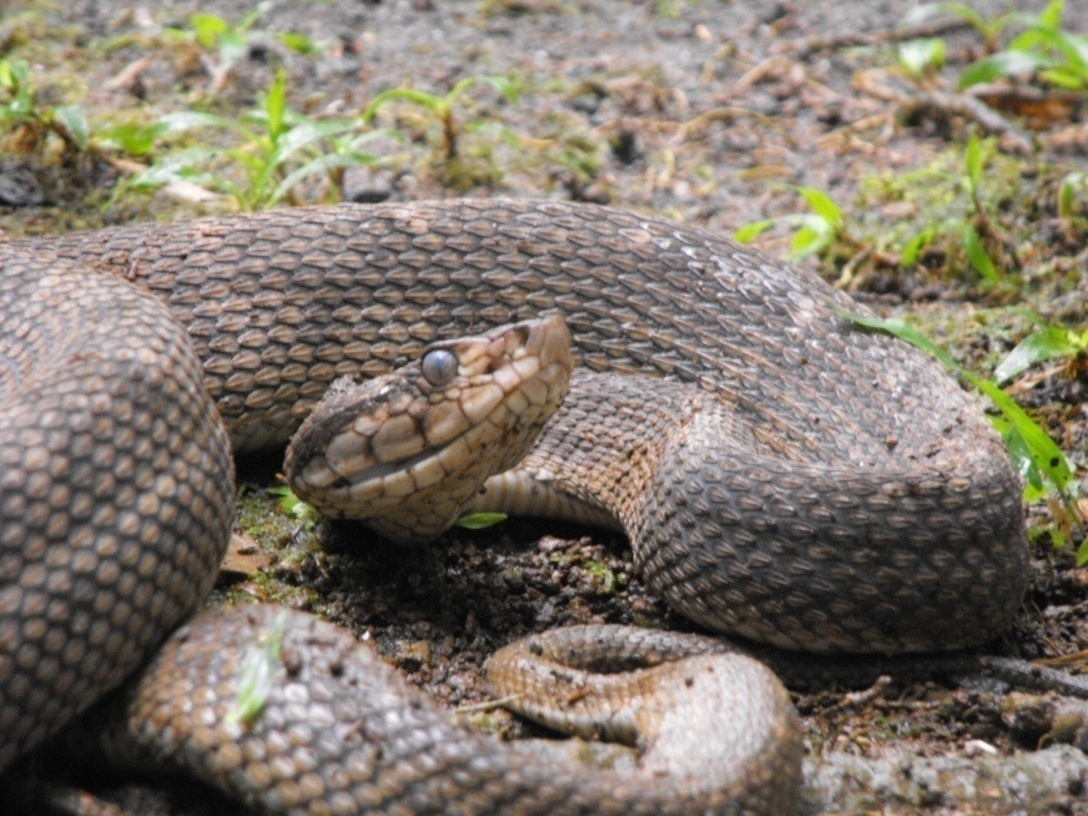

Conservation status
- Endangered (IUCN 3.1)

Scientific classification
- Kingdom: Animalia
- Phylum: Chordata
- Class: Reptilia
- Order: Squamata
- Suborder: Serpentes
- Family: Viperidae
- Genus: Bothrops
- Species: B. caribbaeus

Binomial name
- Bothrops caribbaeus (Garman, 1887)

Synonyms
- Coluber lanceolatus Lacépède, 1789 (part); Trigonocephalus caribbaeus Garman, 1887; Bothrops caribbeus – Lazell, 1964; Bothrops lanceolatus caribbaeus – Sandner-Montilla, 1990; Bothrops caribbaea – Schwartz & Henderson, 1991

= Saint Lucia lancehead =

Species of snake

The Saint Lucia lancehead or Saint Lucia pit viper (Bothrops caribbaeus) is an endangered species of pit viper endemic to the island of Saint Lucia in the Lesser Antilles.

== Description ==
The Saint Lucia lancehead can reach a total length in excess of 1.3 m (4.3 ft). It is gray to gray-brown, with an irregular temporal stripe, and gray or brown markings that are distinct mid-dorsally and fade towards its sides.

== Distribution and habitat ==
It is found only on Saint Lucia. Along with Bothrops lanceolatus and B. atrox, it is one of three Bothrops species found in the Caribbean. The snake is threatened and today limited to two areas of the island. The only location outside of St. Lucia where these snakes are kept is the Kentucky Reptile Zoo.

== Venom ==
Accidents with this pit viper are extremely rare, with only one report. The victim had local pain and edema, and after a week had developed left facial hemiplegia with facial paralysis and local bleeding, extensive swelling, edema in the abdomen and chest, necrosis and cerebral ischemia.
