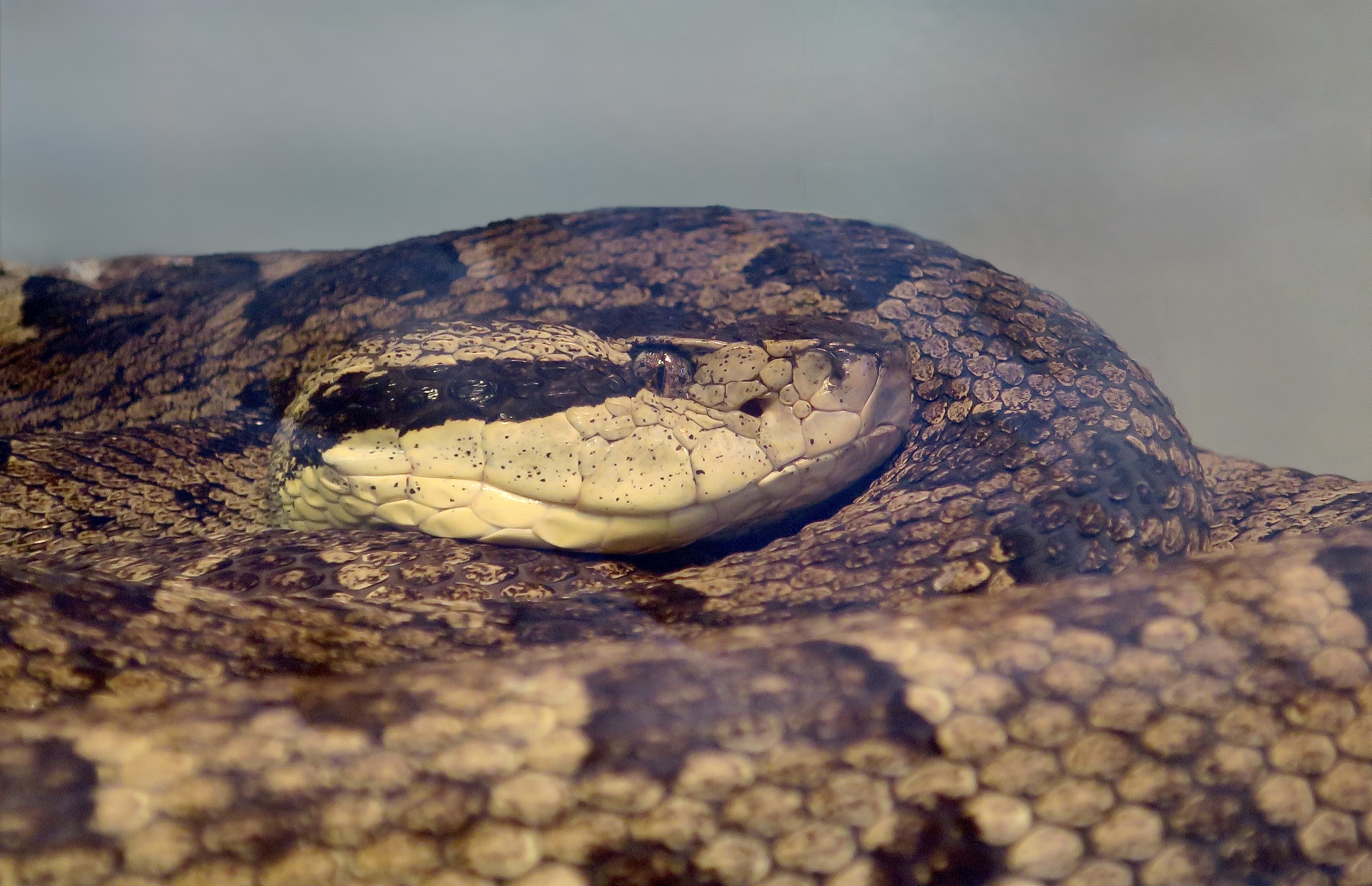
- At Phoenix Herpetological Sanctuary.

Conservation status
- Endangered (IUCN 3.1)

Scientific classification
- Kingdom: Animalia
- Phylum: Chordata
- Class: Reptilia
- Order: Squamata
- Suborder: Serpentes
- Family: Viperidae
- Genus: Bothrops
- Species: B. lanceolatus

Binomial name
- Bothrops lanceolatus (Bonnaterre, 1790)

Synonyms
- Vipera Caerulescens Laurenti, 1768; [Coluber] glaucus Gmelin, 1788; C[oluber]. Lanceolatus Lacépède, 1789; C[oluber]. Brasiliensis Lacépède, 1789; C[oluber]. Tigrinus Lacépède, 1789; C[oluber]. lanceolatus – Bonaterre, 1790; C[oluber]. hastatus Suckow, 1798; Vipera lanceolata – Latreille In Sonnini & Latreille, 1801; Vipera brasiliniana Latreille In Sonnini & Latreille, 1801; Coluber Megaera Shaw, 1802; Vipera tigrina – Daudin, 1803; Vipera brasiliana Daudin, 1803; Trigonocephalus lanceolatus – Oppel, 1811; [Trigonocephalus] tigrinus – Oppel, 1811; [Cophias] lanceolatus – Merrem, 1820; Trigonoceph[alus]. lanceolatus – Schinz, 1822; Craspedocephalus lanceolatus – Fitzinger, 1826; [Bothrops] lanceolatus – Wagler, 1830; T[rigonocephalus]. lanceolatus – Schlegel, 1837; Bothrops cenereus Gray, 1842; C[rasedocephalus]. brasiliensis – Wucherer, 1863; Bothrops brasiliensis – Cope, 1875; Bothrops glaucus – Vaillant, 1887; Lachesis lanceolatus – Boulenger, 1896; Lachesis lanceolata – Boettger, 1898; Bothrops lanceolata – Hoge, 1953; Vipera coerulescens Hoge & Romano-Hoge, 1981; Bothrops l[anceolatus]. lanceolatus – Sandner-Montilla, 1990; Bothrops lanceolatus – Golay et al., 1993; Vipera coerulescens – Golay et al., 1993

= Bothrops lanceolatus =

Species of snake

Bothrops lanceolatus — known as the fer-de-lance, Martinican pit viper, and Martinique lancehead — is a species of pit viper endemic to the Caribbean island of Martinique. Some reserve the common name fer-de-lance for this species, while others apply that name to other Bothrops species, as well. No subspecies are currently recognized.

== Geographic range ==
Bothrops lanceolatus is generally considered endemic to the island of Martinique in the Lesser Antilles. Along with Bothrops caribbaeus and B. atrox, it is one of three Bothrops species found in the West Indies. The type locality according to Bonnaterre (1790:11) is "La Martinique".

== Description ==
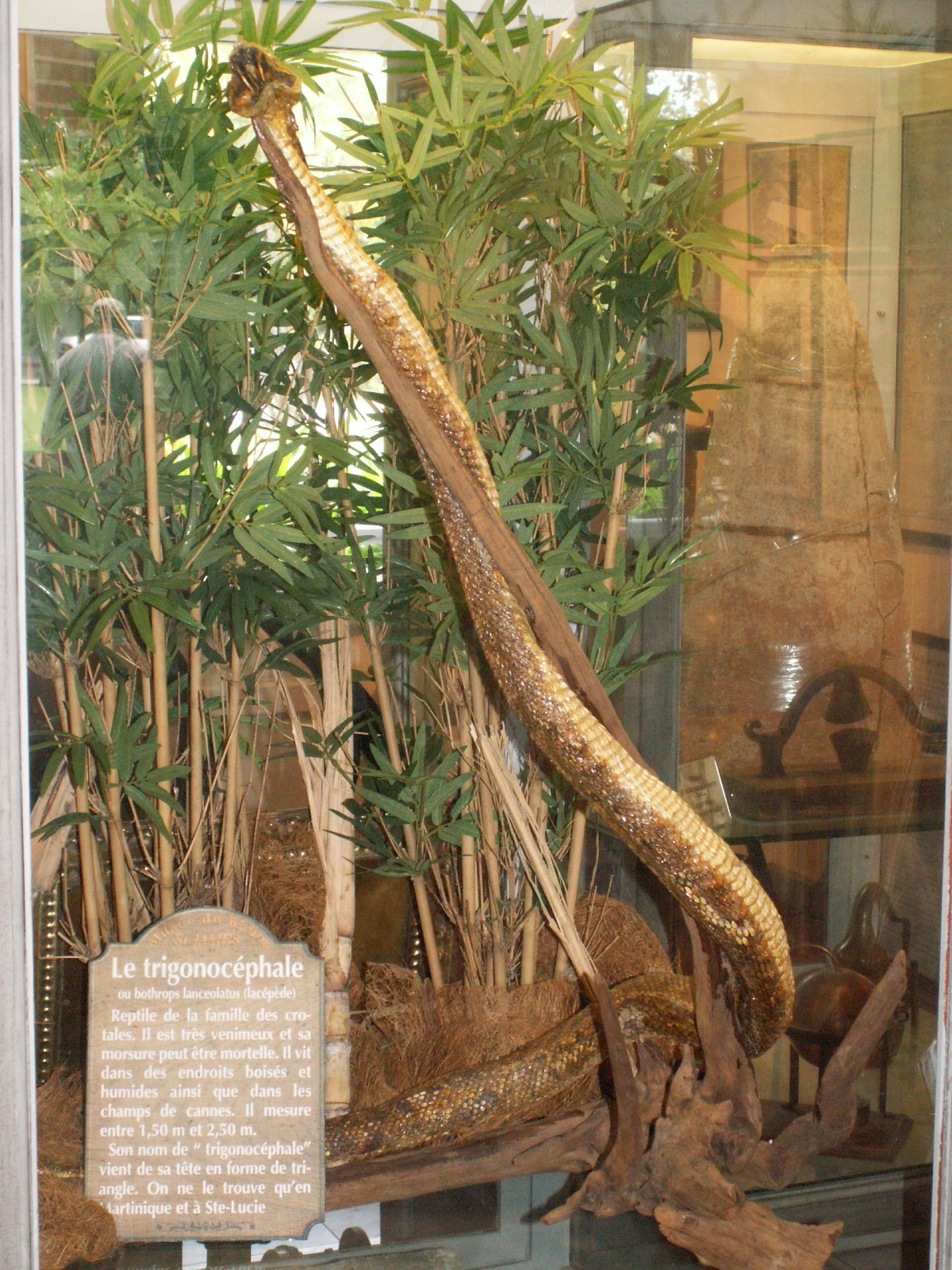
Taxidermied specimens.

It measures 1.5 to 2 m (5 to 7 ft) long. Its color is brown, black and gray.

== Behavior ==
As ambush predators, Martinique lanceheads typically wait patiently somewhere for unsuspecting prey to wander by. They are known to select a specific ambush site and return to it every year in time for the spring migration of birds. Studies have indicated these snakes learn to improve their strike accuracy over time.

=== Diet ===
All of the various species are carnivorous, and eat other animals. Their diet primarily changes based on size and location. Larger individuals can feed on larger prey, while smaller species must eat smaller prey items. Martinican pit vipers hunt rats, mice, birds, rabbits, lizards, frogs, snakes, bats, and more.

=== Reproduction ===
With few exceptions, crotalines are ovoviviparous, meaning that the embryos develop within eggs that remain inside the mother's body until the offspring are ready to hatch, at which time the hatchlings emerge as functionally free-living young. In such species, the eggshells are reduced to soft membranes that the young shed, either within the reproductive tract, or immediately after emerging.

== Venom ==
Their venom has toxins that can cause clotting and bleeding in humans, as well as muscle damage and swelling.

== Cultural significance ==
Depictions of Bothrops lanceolatus on the "snake flag" of Martinique.

The species is depicted on the 'snake flag' of Martinique, though the usage of this flag has been largely discontinued in recent years. This forms one of the few examples (the Gadsden flag and the First Navy Jack of the United States, and the flag of Mexico being others) of snakes being depicted on flags.
