= KaʼKabish =

Archaeological site

Coordinates: 17.81611°N 88.72972°W

KaʼKabish is an archaeological site in the Orange Walk District of Belize, Central America, located near the Maya sites of Lamanai, El Pozito, and Blue Creek. It was once a moderate sized city, built as part of the Maya civilization, and has been determined to have been largely autonomous throughout its history. The modern communities of Indian Church and San Filipe are near to KaʼKabish, and the Mennonite community of Blue Creek is slightly further afield. A road connecting Indian Church to San Filipe separates the site into two areas, the North Complex and the South Complex.

Alfredo Barrera Vasquez's Diccionario Maya defines the name as; "KAʼKAB-IS-AX 10: (place name); kaʼkab: village, the seat of population, high land and strong; is: Ipomoea batatas, Lam: sweet + ax: wart; name of the archaeological ruins located near Numkʼini (Nun kʼini, Campeche)."

The current name of the site is believed to be relatively modern, but its origin has resisted attempts to be traced.

== History ==
KaʼKabish is believed to have been initially occupied during the Maya Late Pre-Classic Period (ca. 400 BCE- 200 CE) with one temple securely dated to this time and a second tentatively dated to this period. Material recovered from the tops of some of the buildings suggest that the city was in use at least until end of the Classic Period (900 CE), while evidence from the residential zone surrounding the city indicates a thriving occupation as late as the end of the Early Post-Classic Period (1200 CE).

== Site description ==
The site has only recently become the focus of intensive investigation. A mid-1990s study of the site core revealed a total of 27 monumental structures arranged around two plazas, a subsequent study increased the number of structures to 55.

Within several of these structures the looted remains of tombs belonging to high status, possibly royal individuals, were discovered. One of these tombs was found to have possessed painted glyphs. The style is part of a tradition of painted tombs first noted at Rio Azul in Northern Guatemala.

== Archaeological Investigations ==
KaʼKabish was first visited by David M. Pendergast of the Royal Ontario Museum while he was working at the nearby site of Lamanai, although the lack of a reliable road made work at the site unfeasible at that time. What was noted at the time was the evidence of wholesale illicit excavations, in which virtually every structure had been looted.

The site was identified initially for potential study in 1990 by members of the Maya Research Program. Due to potentially dangerous conditions in the area, a team did not return to KaʼKabish until 1995, when formative mapping and surveying of the site was conducted.

Dr. Helen R. Haines (TUARC, Trent University) began establishing the groundwork for the KaʼKabish Archaeological Research Project (KARP) in 2005, with the permission of Belize's Institute of Archeology, a branch of the National Institute of Culture and History (NICH). KARP's first field season was 2007, with a focus on clearing vegetation from, and remapping, the site's South Complex. The North Complex of the site was remapped in 2009.

Since its inception, the KaʼKabish Archaeological Research Project has expended efforts on mapping the site to gain an understanding of the extent of the site and the types of buildings present. Knowledge of the architectural arrangements provides significant clues as to the importance of the site and the role it might have played in the larger Maya political landscape. Under a grant from the Social Sciences and Humanities Research Council of Canada, first excavations at KaʼKabish began in 2010 and have continued in the intervening years, with excavation seasons in 2011, 2013, and 2015.

As of 2013, survey and excavations have located 90 structures, located in 8 groups. Architectural features include two major temples, a ball court with circular ball court marker, and several large platforms (or range buildings) that likely served as royal or high status elite residences and/or administrative structures. Research has also been conducted on the numerous chultuns located at KaʼKabish.

== Fundraising and Purchase ==
Previously, the site sustained damage during the construction of the Indian Church to San Filipe Road, and two buildings were removed and their limestone material used for road fill for the road. Looting has also been a problem, and several structures have been destabilized through looter's trenches.

Until 2015, the land on which the site is located was administered by the San Filipe Land Committee, and was owned by three different landowners. Though the owners were supportive of archaeological research, KaʼKabish was in danger due to encroaching agricultural expansion. This prompted an attempt to purchase the land and, under the auspices of NICH, establish KaʼKabish as a National Park. A fundraising campaign raised $20,030 CND of a needed $70,000 CND, providing enough money to make a down payment on the site in July 2015. The funds for the campaign were managed by Trent University, and the land was successfully removed from the Agricultural Land Registry.

== Fieldschool ==
In 2013, field school credit for college archaeological students began being offered via Trent University. Students participating in the field school stay in the village of Indian Church during their time with the project.
