= Marco Gonzalez =

Archaeological site

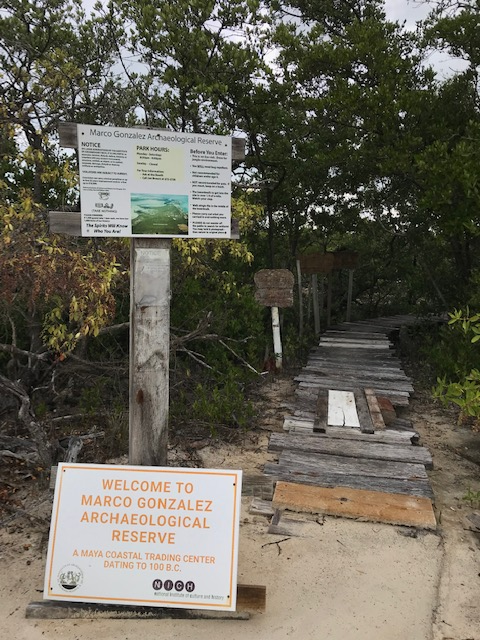
- Entrance to the Marco Gonzalez Archaeological Reserve
- Interactive map of Marco Gonzalez
- Periods: Preclassic
- Cultures: Maya
- Location: San Pedro, Ambergris Caye, Belize
- Region: Ambergris Caye

History
- Built: 100 BCE
- Abandoned: 1500 CE

Site notes
- Excavation dates: 1984–1994
- Archaeologists: E. Graham; D. Pendergast Royal Ontario Museum

Marco Gonzalez is a Maya archaeological site located near the southern tip of Ambergris Caye off the coast of Belize. It was first recorded in 1984 by Drs. Elizabeth Graham and David M. Pendergast, and was named by them after their local guide.

The existence of the site, which is located approximately 8 kilometres (5.0 mi) south of San Pedro, had been known to the town's inhabitants for many years, as had most of the other sites that dot the island. The site was excavated by Drs. Graham and Pendergast between 1984 and 1994.

== Topography ==
The ruins are about 185 by 355 metres (607 by 1,165 ft) in size, and are easily visible from the air flying into San Pedro town. The low-lying area around the site is predominated by red (Rhizophora mangle) and black (Avicennia nitida) mangroves. The site itself is covered by white mangrove (Laguncularia racemosa), gumbo-limbo (Bursera simaruba), white poisonwood (Cameraria belizensis), silver palmettos (Thrinax sp.), cabbage palms (Roystonea oleracea) and a variety of shrubbery. It is roughly 3.6 metres (12 ft) above sea level, slightly higher than the surrounding swamps due to accumulated anthrosol, soil composed primarily of artefacts (e.g., pottery, tools), conch and other shells, building remains and other debris resulting from millennia of human habitation. The presence of artefacts beneath the mangal swamps indicates that the site was once larger than what is now exposed.

Surrounded by thick jungle, access to the site is difficult, especially during and immediately after the rainy season. The trails leading there have become increasingly overgrown and visitors are rare.

== Ruins ==
There are at least 49 distinct structures and walls within the mapped area of the site. The structures at the northern end appear to be arranged around plazas, while elsewhere the building plan appears less formal. All of the structures are relatively low platforms, ranging in height from 30 centimetres (12 in) to 4.2 metres (14 ft). There are none of the pyramids typical of other Maya sites in this region.

Building foundations are composed mainly of blocks of Pleistocene limestone that was most likely quarried from local sources. Other building materials include the queen conch Strombus gigas as well as other shells. Crude plaster floors were found in some structures, and evidence suggests that many of the habitations were of pole-and-thatch-roof design.

The site is littered with enormous amounts of broken pottery, as well as conch shells, chert tools and human bones. There is considerable evidence of excessive looting.

== History ==
The excavations conducted by Graham and Pendergast in 1989 indicate that initial occupation of the site occurred about 2,100 years ago, during the late Preclassic period. From then, the site appears to have been continuously inhabited until roughly 1500 CE, at which time it was abruptly abandoned. The peak period of occupation at the site was during the Postclassic period, from about 1200 to 1400 CE.

The Maya inhabitants are believed to have been predominantly fisherfolk and later, during the late Classic period (from about 800–500 CE), involved in intensive salt production. Evidence suggests that, during this period, the inhabitants of Marco Gonzalez traded extensively with other Maya sites. The abundant pottery that litters the site is made from mixtures of clay and quartz; since there is no available source of these materials on Ambergris Caye, they (or perhaps even the pots themselves) must have been brought to the site from overseas. Other artefacts at the site, such as chert and flint tools and other granite artefacts, minor jade and obsidian, were also obviously imported from elsewhere since the materials have no natural source anywhere on Ambergris Caye. The site's setting on the tip of the island may have given it a strategic position on maritime trade routes that existed at the time.

=== Theories on abandonment ===
In 1993, a geological history of southern Ambergris Caye and the Marco Gonzalez area was published by R.K. Dunn and S.J. Mazzullo, which provides a theory as to why the site was abruptly abandoned around 500 years ago. A representative cross-section of the site revealed evidence that, between roughly 2000 and 1000 years ago, the coastal geography changed from open, shallow sea to mangal swampland.

Rapid rising in sea levels caused by the melting of the last Pleistocene glaciers caused the geography of the coastal area around Marco Gonzalez to change. As sea levels rose, the coastline shifted to shelter the surrounding area from currents, allowing mangrove swamps to completely surround the site. Eventually, the encroachment of the surrounding jungle and swamplands made the site inhospitable, and the Maya abandoned it.

The discovery of artefacts below present sea level, and beneath the mangrove peats, indicated that the habitable area of the site was much larger in the past than now; and subsequently that the inhabitants moved to progressively higher ground as sea level rose and the swamps encroached upon them.

== Bibliography ==
- Mazzullo, S.J. "Marco Gonzales". Casado Internet Group. Retrieved 2011-04-21.
