= Jaguar Temple =

Stepped-pyramid structure in Belize

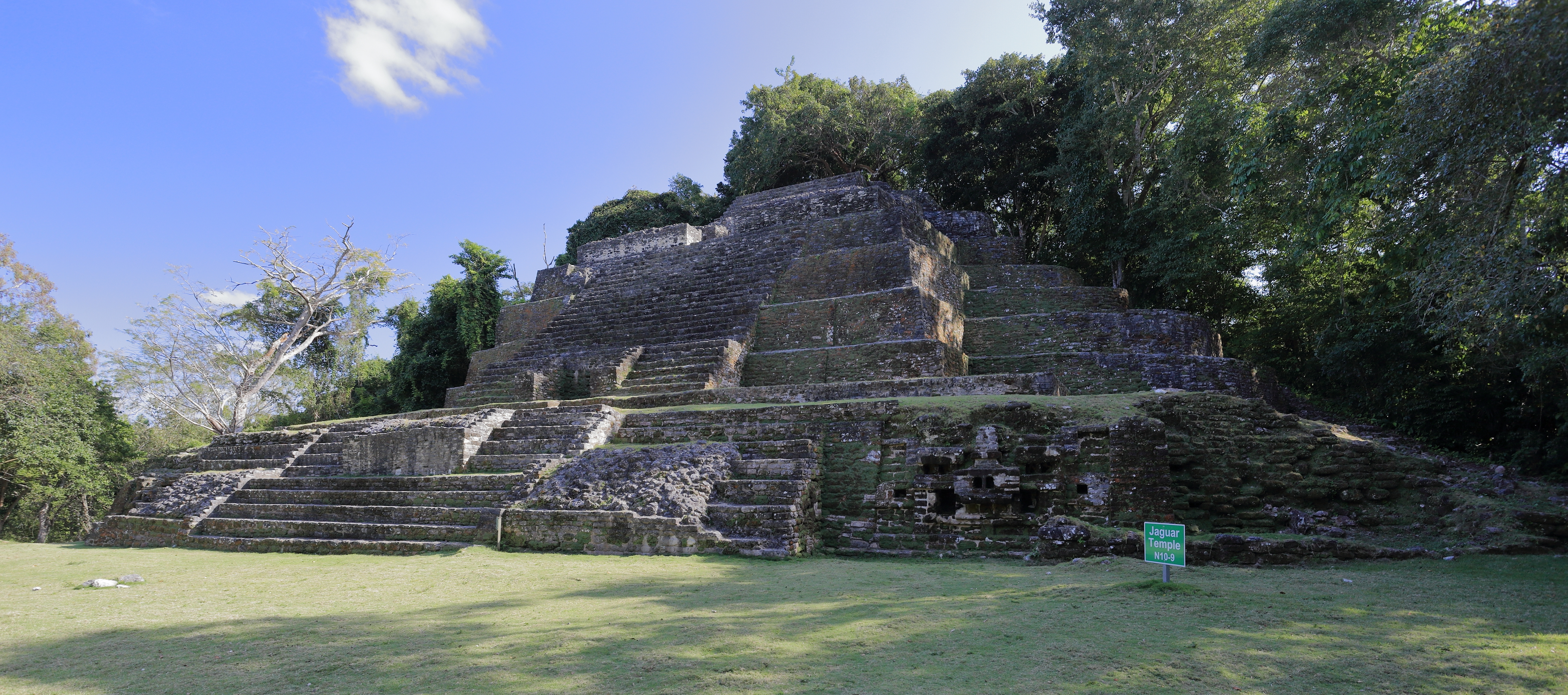
Jaguar temple

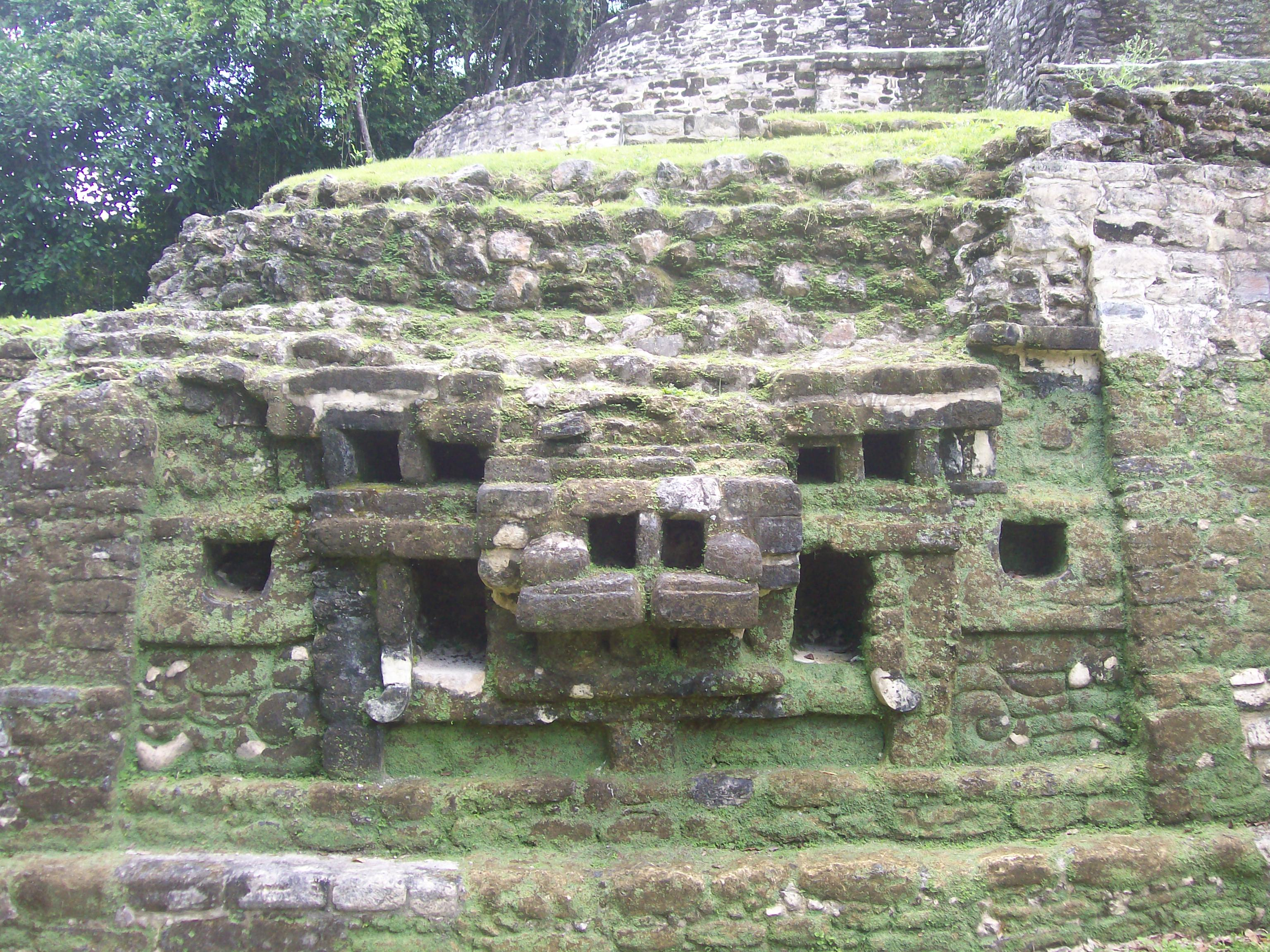
"Jaguar mask"

The Jaguar Temple (officially known as Lamanai Structure N10-9) is a stepped-pyramid structure at the Maya archaeological site of Lamanai, located in present-day Belize. The structure is twelve feet shorter in exposed height than the High Temple, however a significant amount of this temple is under the ground, having been covered by dirt on its front side, and jungle roughage on its left side (when facing the front of the temple). Angular (blocky) jaguar heads adorn the front in the same style as the other temples in this site.

== See also ==
- Mask Temple
