= Elizabeth Graham =

Elizabeth Graham may refer to:

- Elizabeth Jennings Graham (1830–1901), black woman who insisted on being admitted to a streetcar in 1854
- Lally Weymouth (1943–2025, born Elizaberh Graham), American journalist
- Elizabeth Graham (academic) (active since 1989), educator in Mesoamerican archaeology
