= Mask Temple =

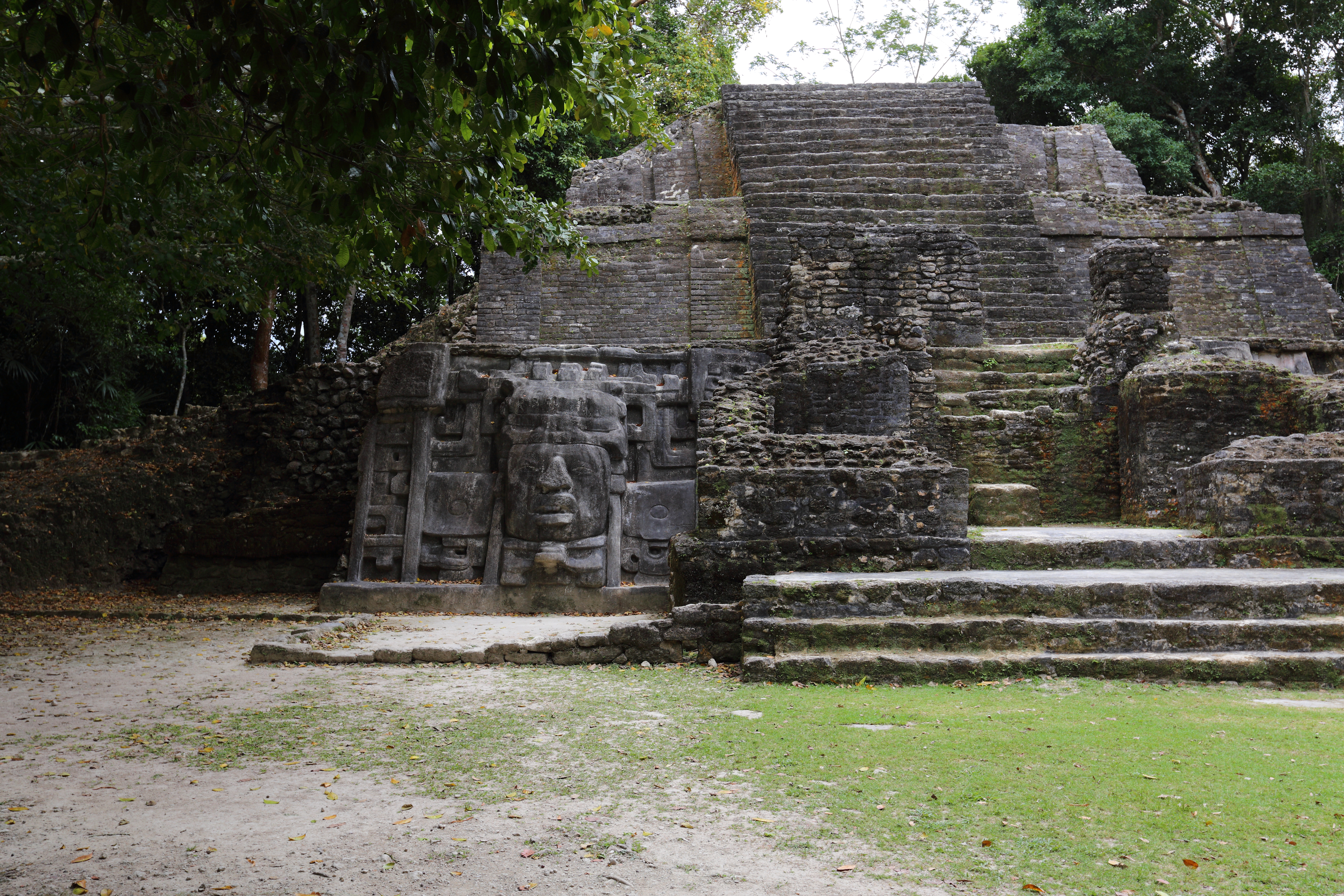
Mask Temple

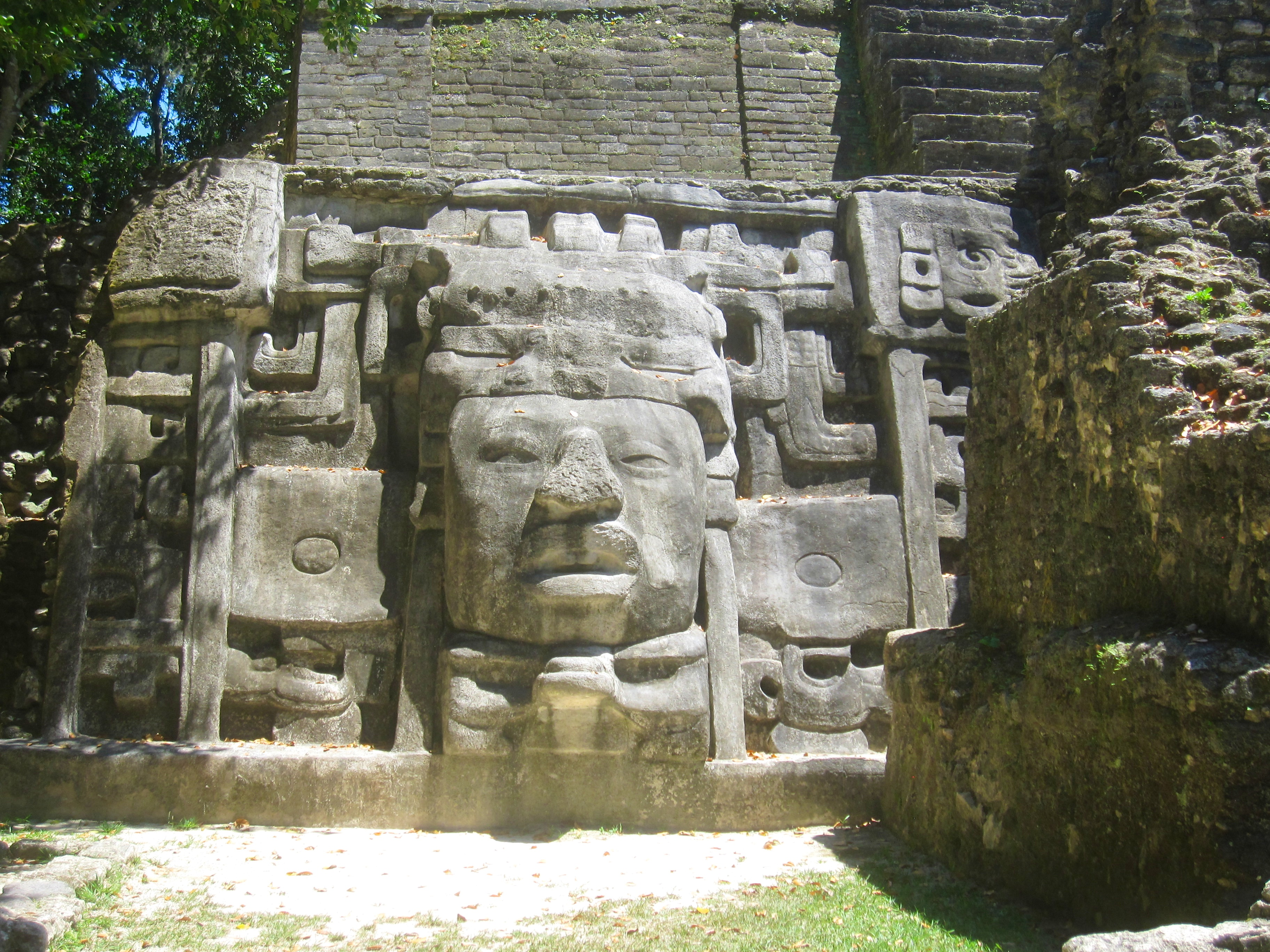
The Mask (Mask Temple, Lamanai)

The Mask Temple (officially known as Lamanai Structure N9-56) is a Maya civilization structure at the archaeological site of Lamanai, in present-day Orange Walk District, Belize.

It is the smallest of three excavated pre-Columbian temples at Lamanai (the two other temples are the Jaguar Temple and High Temple). Construction most likely began c. 200 BC, and the temple was modified until c. 1300 AD. A mask carving is exposed on the right side wall. Like the rest of the temple, the mask is made from limestone. The mask has Olmec facial features, particularly its upturned lip and broad nose, and is thirteen feet tall. Another carving had been covered by a stone wall on the left side; it was uncovered in the spring of 2011, revealing an identical mask. This reflects the tradition of symmetry in Mayan architecture. The masks were a much later addition, dating c. 400 AD, about 600 years after the temple's original construction. The masks are adorned with the headdress of a crocodile, falling in line with Lamanai's namesake which, translated, means "Submerged Crocodile."

Because the original masks are made from limestone, they are at risk of erosion from prolonged exposure to weathering. The limestone also wears down from overexposure to the chemicals in sunscreen and the oils from hands. To protect the masks, fiberglass replicas were placed over them.

Inside the Mask Temple is a tomb that holds the remains of a man with jade and shell jewelry. Additionally, the tomb once held textiles and mats. Nearby the temple is a second, smaller tomb holding the remains of a woman. Both tombs date from around the same time and likely hold two of Lamanai's former rulers. Their relation is only speculative.
