= Ambergris Caye =

Island in Belize

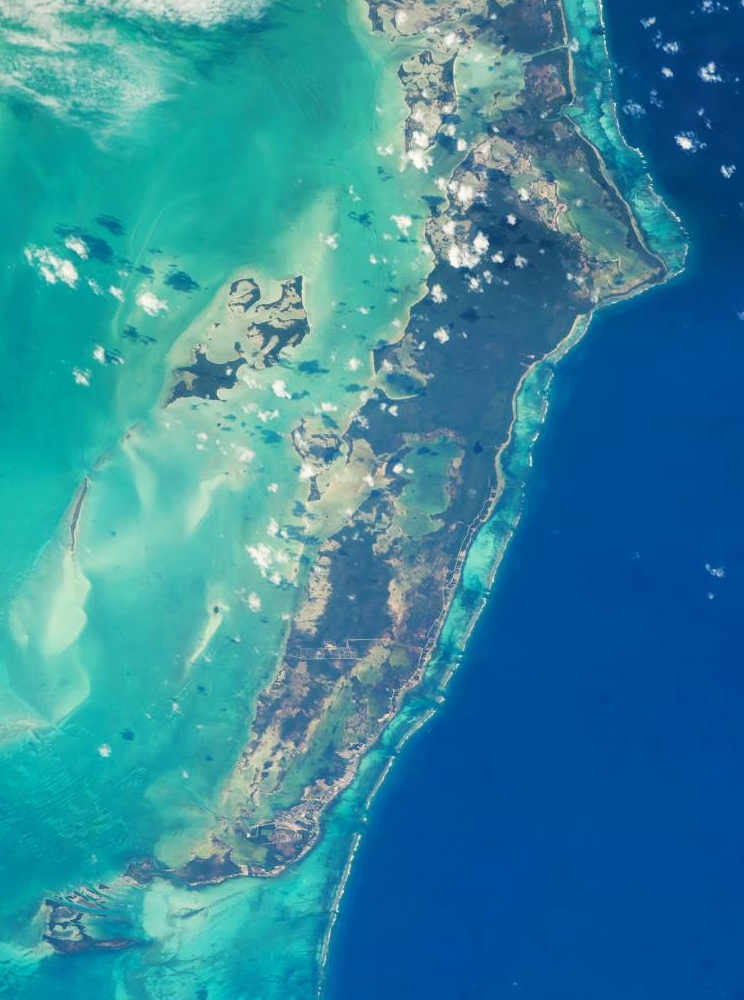
- Ambergris Caye photographed from the International Space Station

- Location within Belize

Geography
- Location: Caribbean Sea
- Coordinates: 18°0′50.21″N 87°55′51.74″W

Administration
- Belize
- District: Belize District
- Largest settlement: San Pedro Town (pop. 13,381)

Ambergris Caye (/æmˈbɜːrɡrɪs ˈkiː/ am-BUR-gris KEE; Spanish: Cayo Ambergris) is the largest island of Belize, located northeast of the country's mainland, in the Caribbean Sea. It is about 40 kilometres (25 mi) long from north to south, and about 1.6 kilometres (1 mi) wide. Many parts of the island have been modified by human development since the arrival of coconut plantations in the 17th century, but it remains largely white coral sand with mangrove forest at its centre. Its eastern coast runs parallel to the northernmost stretch of the Belize Barrier Reef, a UNESCO World Heritage Site.

A Maya community lived on the island in Pre-Columbian times, leaving behind distinctive polished red ceramics. It is widely believed that maritime trade motivated the Mayans themselves to excavate "Boca Bacalar Chico", the marine channel that separates the island from the Mexican mainland, but its origins could also have been natural (e.g. a hurricane).

This canal enabled canoe-based merchants to bypass the outer barrier reef, connecting trade routes between Chetumal Bay and the Caribbean coast while supporting coastal settlements such as the Marco Gonzalez archaeological site.

San Pedro Town is the largest settlement and only town on Ambergris Caye. There are also a number of small villages and resorts that serve the island's growing tourism industry, especially ecotourism and scuba diving. Although administered as part of the Belize District, the closest point on the mainland is part of the Corozal District.

== Etymology ==
Ambergris, from the Old French ambre gris (literally "gray amber"), is a rare substance produced in the intestines of sperm whales, valuable historically and in some modern perfumes as a fixative. In the 17th century, whalers in the tropical Atlantic Ocean operated from many islands like Ambergris Caye, and although sperm whales are not considered residents of Belizean waters, the animals continue to pass through on a regular basis.

== Tourism ==
Tourism development of Ambergris Caye began in the early 1970s and grew considerably in the later years of the 20th century. The main attractions are the Belize Barrier Reef and its beaches. That barrier reef is the second largest in the world, after the Great Barrier Reef of Australia. The caye has a small airstrip serviced by Tropic Air and Maya Island Air, whilst Astrum Helicopters services not only the local airstrip but the various resorts as well. It can be reached by plane or helicopter from Belize City as well as by numerous fast sea ferries. Ambergris Caye can also be reached by ferry from Chetumal in Mexico.

Ambergris Caye is commonly referred to as the Isla Bonita ('Beautiful Island'), after Madonna's 1987 hit "La Isla Bonita" mentioned a place called San Pedro (although Madonna has said the song does not refer to any particular place). Ambergris Caye is famous for the turquoise seascapes surrounding the island which match the character and Caribbean charm of the destination. Because of the island's small size, the main form of powered transportation is by golf cart.

San Pedro Day is celebrated annually on June 27.

== Gallery ==
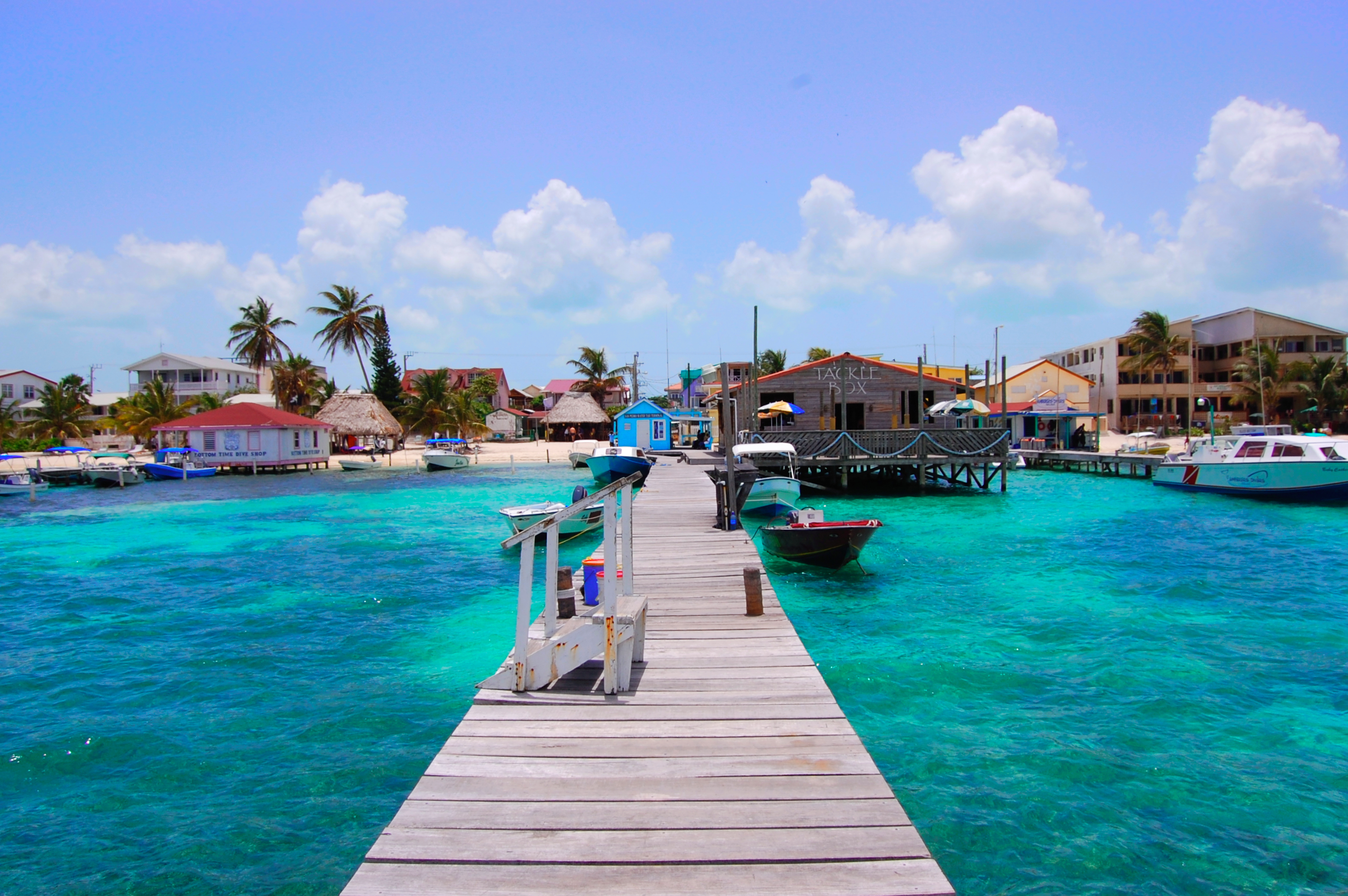
Beach at San Pedro

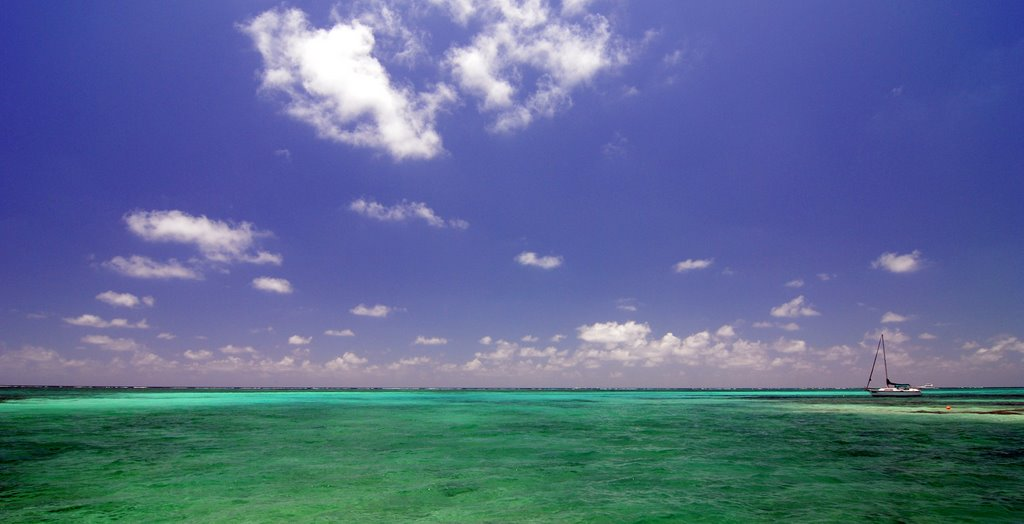
Azure water off the coast of Ambergris Caye

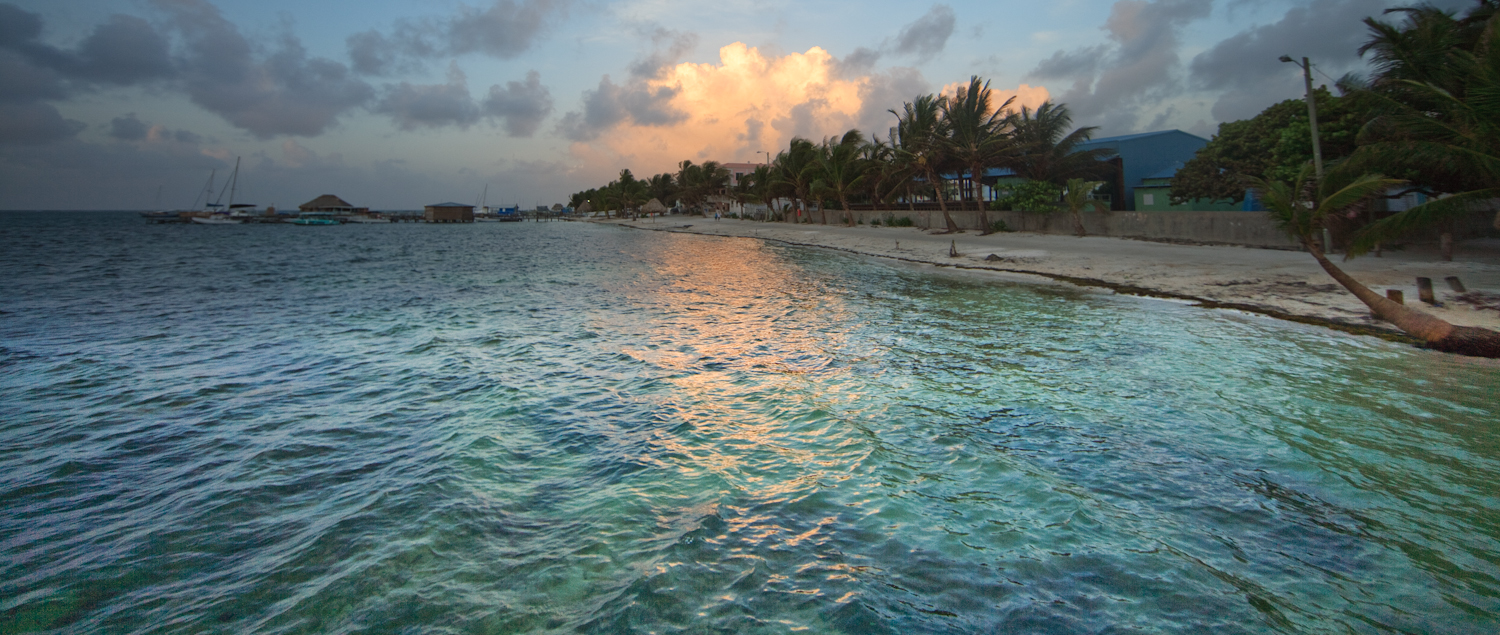
Dusk on Ambergris Caye

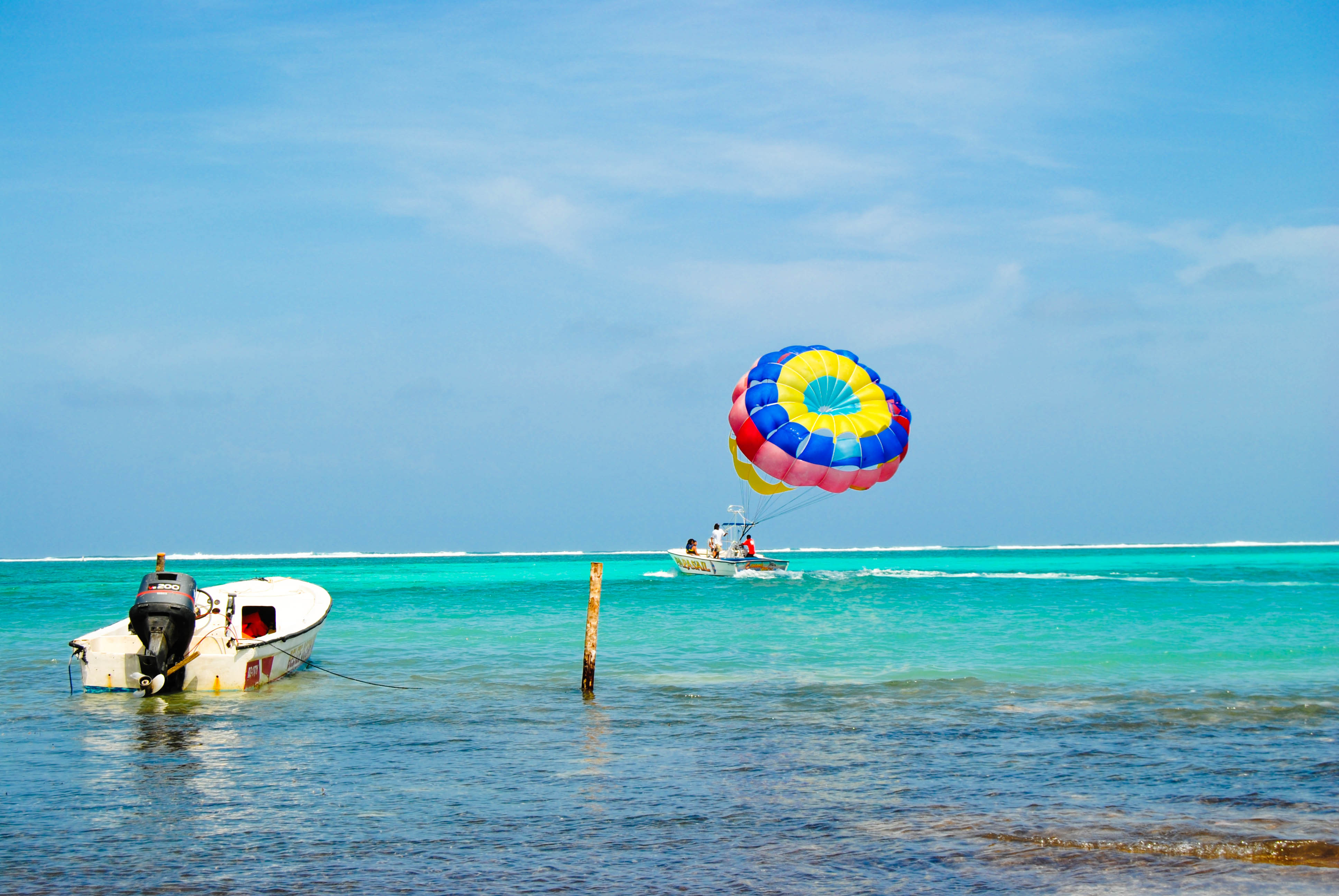
View of the Barrier Reef in the distance

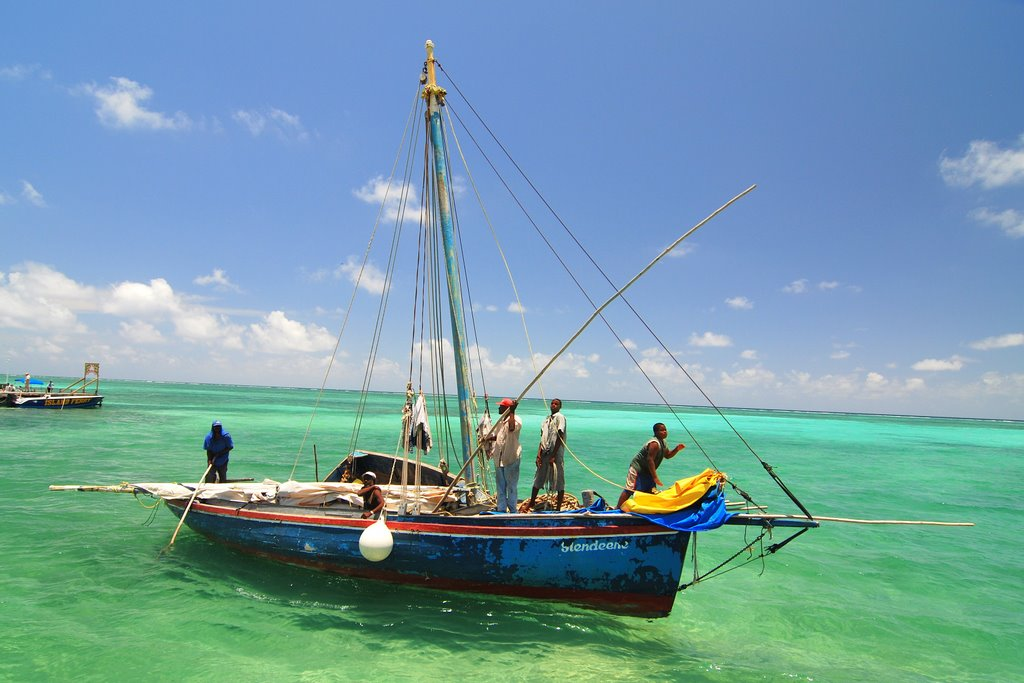
Fishing off the coast of Ambergris Caye

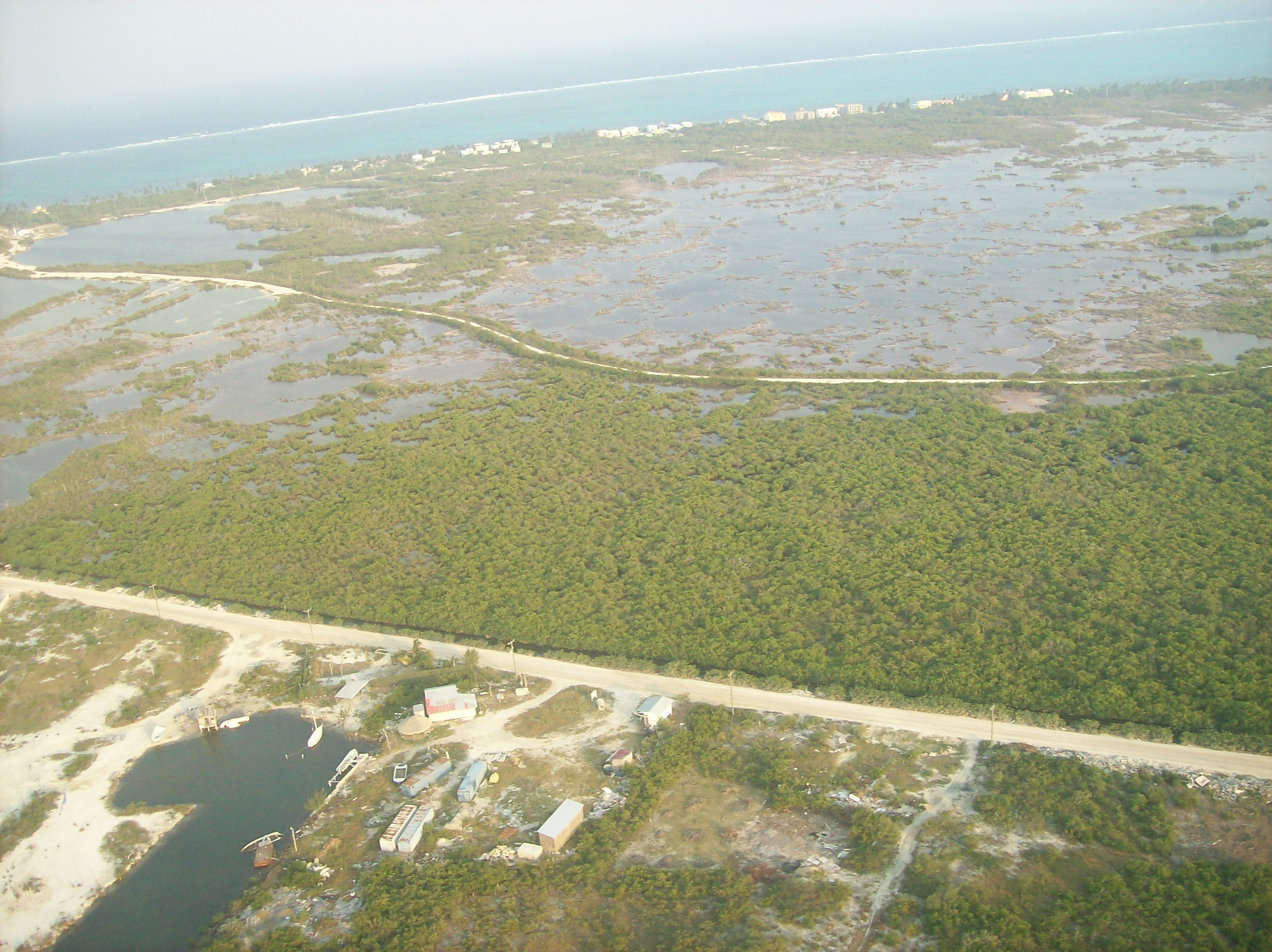
Road near San Pedro

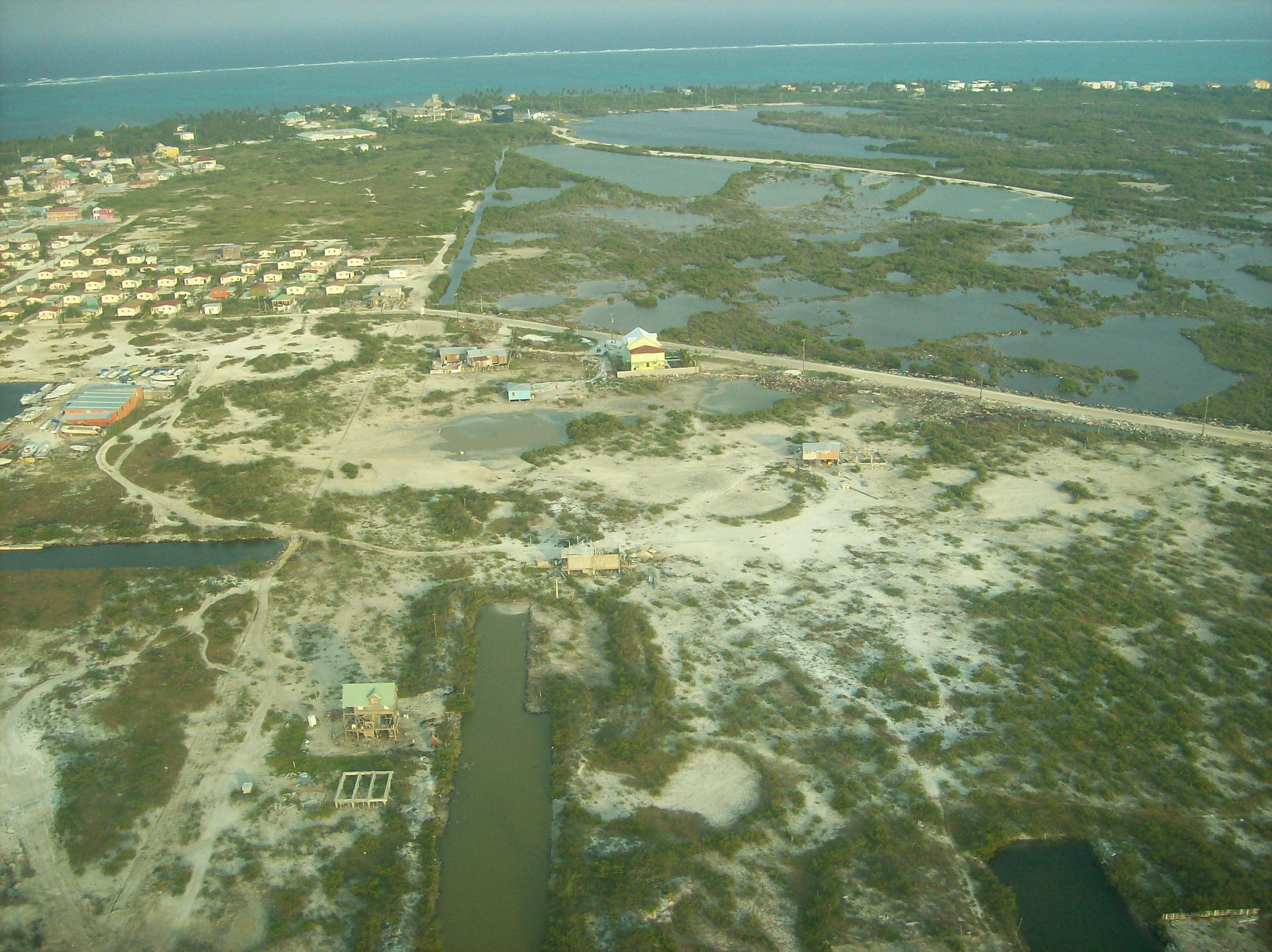
Houses in San Pedro and mangrove swamp

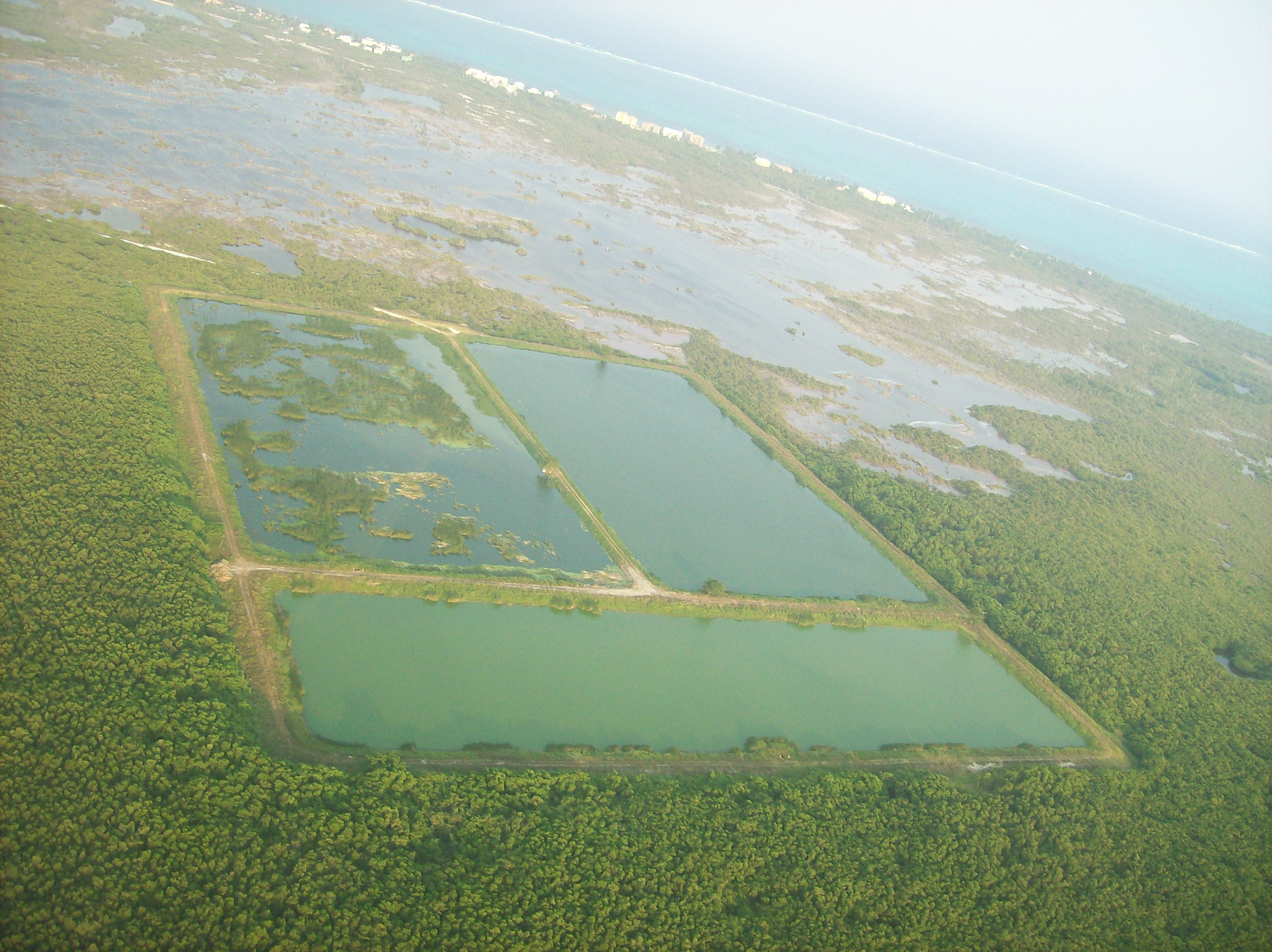
Manmade ponds

== Secret Beach ==
The majority of Ambergris Caye is reserved for national park/wildlife preserve limiting the availability of real estate. To the north of San Pedro Town is the destination of Belize Secret Beach, one of the more popular beach destinations in Belize. The Belize Secret Beach destination on Ambergris Caye is often called "San Pedro's worst kept secret", as the Secret Beach area has yet to see substantial development, but has become an increasingly popular destination for tourists and locals, allowing the area to boast a remote atmosphere but still offer more developed amenities. Secret Beach also features cenotes, sinkholes, and caves.

== In popular culture ==
Two resorts north of San Pedro played host to the first season of Fox's Temptation Island in 2000, aired in 2001.
