= Rockstone Pond =

Village in Belize

Coordinates: 17°45′N 88°20′W

Rockstone Pond is a settlement located in Belize. It is a mainland village located in Belize District, near the Maya site of Altun Ha.
