= San Carlos, Belize =

- Location within Belize
- Country: Belize
- District: Orange Walk District
- Time zone: UTC-6 (Central)

San Carlos is a small village in the north of Belize, in Orange Walk District, situated on the northern bank of New River, surrounded by jungle. It is four miles from Indian Church, and can be accessed by road from Orange Walk Town or by boat from the New River. San Carlos has a population of 154 (2013) of Mestizo ethnicity. There are 32 occupied homes and 36 families in the village.

== History ==
The village was set up by a group of families around 1970 from the larger town of Guinea Grass Town. Other inhabitants are originally from Guatemala, immigrating to Belize during the tumultuous years of civil war.

== Infrastructure and technology ==
Water for washing and bathing is pumped from wells. Rain water tanks are used to collect drinking water from June to December. An NGO donated 25 solar panels to the community providing evening light to 25 homes. A few families have purchased their own solar panels. Some villagers own generators and use them to power water well pumps, washing machines, lights, televisions, and irrigation systems. A few families rely solely on kerosene lamps or candles for lighting.

There is currently one U.S. Peace Corps volunteer living in the village working on the rural family health project implemented by the Peace Corps and the Ministry of Health in Belize.

== Economy ==
Its economy revolves around agriculture, although a number of men are currently employed at the Maya ruins at Lamanai in order to restore some of the temples. A number of men with pickup trucks are hired by the Mennonites in nearby communities (Indian Creek and Shipyard) to drive, help with farming, and running errands. Agricultural pursuits include a host of fruits and vegetables, including onions, habanero peppers, bananas and watermelons.

A future prospect for San Carlos is to attract tourism by building a jetty at the lagoon to allow tourists visiting the ruins at Lamanai to visit the community.
