= Lamanai =

Archaeological site in Belize

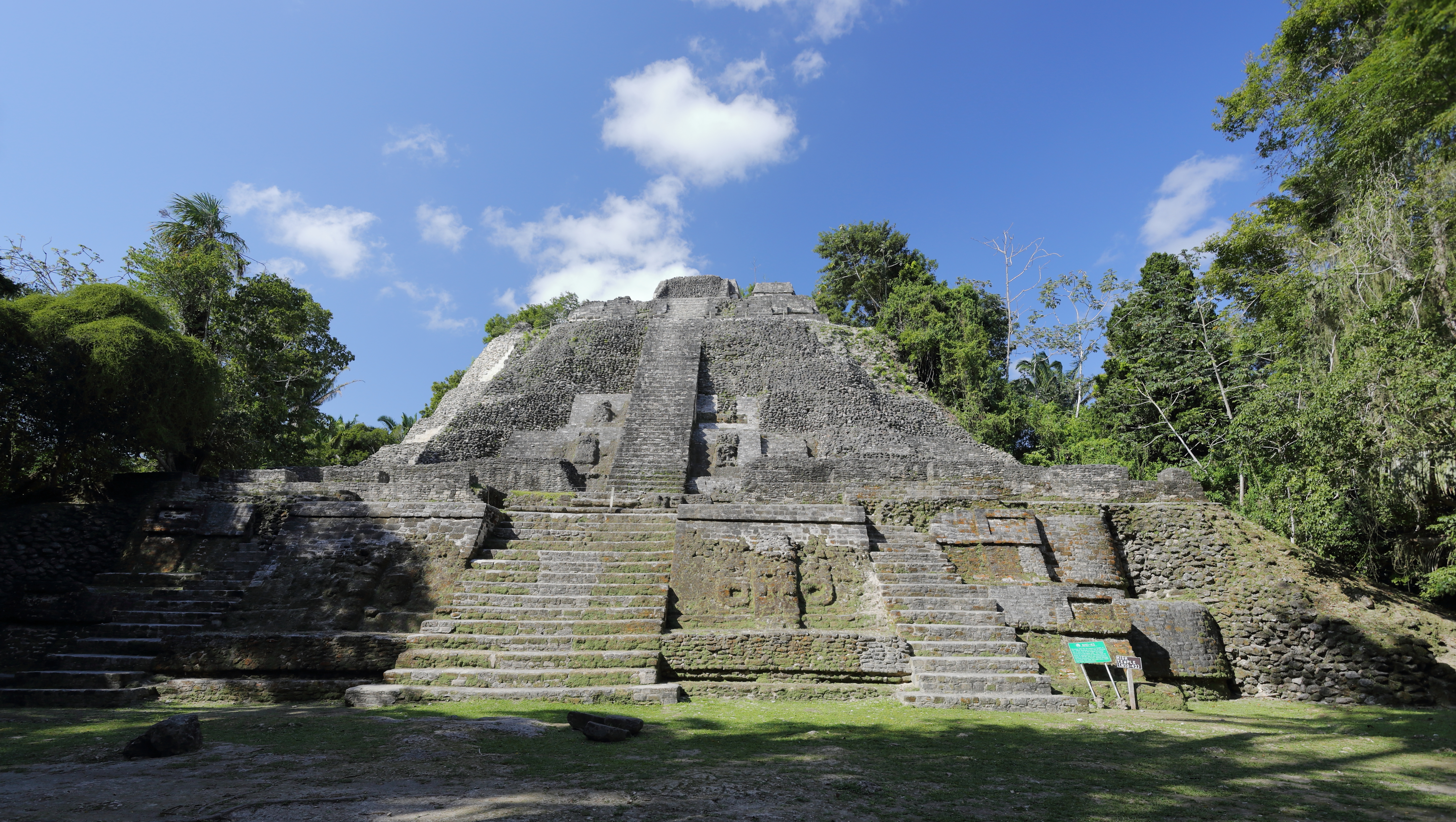
- The High Temple of Lamanai

- Location within Mesoamerica
- 17°45′9″N 88°39′16″W
- Periods: Preclassic to Postclassic
- Cultures: Maya civilization
- Location: Orange Walk District, Belize
- Region: Orange Walk District

History
- Built: 16th century BC

Lamanai (from Lama'anayin, "submerged crocodile" in Yucatec Maya) is a Mesoamerican archaeological site, and was once a major city of the Maya civilization, located in the north of Belize, in Orange Walk District. The site's name is pre-Columbian, recorded by early Spanish missionaries, and documented over a millennium earlier in Maya inscriptions as Lam'an'ain. Lamanai is renowned for its exceptionally long occupation spanning three millennia, beginning in the Early Preclassic Maya period and continuing through the Spanish and British Colonial periods, into the 20th century. Unlike most Classic-period sites in the southern Maya lowlands, Lamanai was not abandoned at the end of the 10th century AD.

== History ==
Lamanai was occupied as early as the 16th century BC. The site became a prominent centre in the Pre-Classic Period, from the 4th century BC through the 1st century AD. In 625 AD, "Stele 9" was erected there in the Yucatec language of the Maya. Lamanai continued to be occupied up to the 17th century AD. During the Spanish conquest of Yucatán Spanish friars established two Roman Catholic churches here, but a Maya revolt drove the Spanish out. The site was subsequently incorporated by the British in British Honduras, passing with that colony's independence to Belize.

== Site description ==
The vast majority of the site remained unexcavated until the mid-1970s. Archaeological work has concentrated on the investigation and restoration of the larger structures, most notably the Mask Temple, Jaguar Temple, and High Temple. The summit of this latter structure affords a view across the surrounding jungle to a nearby lagoon, part of New River.

A significant portion of the Temple of the Jaguar Masks remains under grassy earth or is covered in dense jungle growth. Fully excavated, it would be significantly taller than the High Temple. In the jaguar temple there is a legend that you can find an ancient spear called the heart of the jaguar, even though the temple got its name from the jaguar masks on each side.

The Maya ruins of Lamanai once belonged to a sizable Maya city in the Orange Walk District of Belize. "Lamanai" comes from the Maya term for "submerged crocodile", a nod to the toothy reptiles who live along the banks of the New River. Lamanai Belize jungle brims with exotic birds and hydrophilic iguanas. There is evidence on Maya life that dates from about 1500 B.C. through Postclassic (A.D. 950–1544) and Spanish colonial times (A.D. 1544–1700).

=== Chau Hiix ===
Nearby ancient Maya site of Chau Hiix presents evidence of a very long continuous occupation from Early Preclassic (ca 1200 BC) to Late Post Classic (ca 1600 AD). It lies between Lamanai and Altun Ha, another site further to the east.

It is positioned on Western Lagoon near its outlet into Spanish Creek. Chau Hiix is 15 km east of Lamanai, and is accessible by waterways travel. Altun Ha lies another 25 km further to the east. The material culture of Chau Hiix shows close ties with both Lamanai and Altun Ha, as well as evidence of interaction with centers in Petén Basin.

There are considerable ancient irrigation works at Chau Hiix, so it was probably an agricultural community supplying food for Lamanai.

Earliest cultural activity at Chau Hiix has been traced to the early Middle Preclassic Swasey phase (ca 1000-500 BC).

== Copper artifacts and their significance at Lamanai ==
Among the many important aspects of Postclassic and early Spanish colonial period Maya life at Lamanai is shown by the presence of significant numbers of copper artifacts. Copper indicates broader trade relations in the southern Maya lowlands, and as a reflection of technological change, the history of metal artifact use at Lamanai is an invaluable element in the reconstruction of Postclassic and early historical dynamics. The archaeological contexts of copper objects recovered at Lamanai beginning, with the appearance of metal at the site by around A.D. 1150.

The archaeological contexts in which copper objects have been recovered at the ancient Maya site of Lamanai in northern Belize have great significance in that these objects served great purpose for the residents of the community during Postclassic time that dates from A.D. 950–1544. Nearly all of the copper objects found at Lamanai are distinctly Mesoamerican in form and design and based on metallurgical analyses it appears that manufacturing technologies were distinctly Mesoamerican as well. The presence of production materials and mis-cast pieces along with the results of chemical compositional and micro structural analysis support the idea that the Mayas at Lamanai were engaged in the on-site production of copper objects by late pre- Columbian times.(cite scott article). Objects are classified and examined in the contexts, forms, styles, uses, and sources of copper objects dating from the Buk ceramic phase, which coincides with the Early Postclassic period (A.D. 950–1200).

There were copper objects recovered at Lamanai beginning, with the appearance of metal at the site by around A.D. 1150. The term "copper" is used to describe the metal found at the site; however, all of the copper artifacts found at Lamanai were alloyed with other metals such as tin or arsenic and could technically be considered bronze (Hosler 1994: 210–213).

The number and variety of copper objects recovered at Lamanai indicate that, as a new commodity with remarkably unique aural and visual properties, metal artifacts played an important role for at least some members of Postclassic and later contact period society. Masson notes that "metal was probably the most highvalued luxury good in this region of the Postclassic Maya world" (2003: 279). The inclusion of copper bells, elaborate rings, and button like ornaments in Early and Middle Postclassic elite burials shows that at least some residents of the site displayed such items in certain social and ritual settings. Copper bells worn during performances acted as auditory reminders of the high social standing of those who displayed them, and the lustrous copper finger rings and elaborate clothing ornaments served as visual indicators of elevated status.

== Trade ==
Trade was an essential component of Mesoamerican life in the Postclassic period and the Maya were active participants in a vast macro regional trade network. The movement of commodities as well as information and ideas into interior areas of the peninsula was facilitated by canoe travel along the coast and the extensive river systems in Belize. The importation of finished copper objects into the Maya area during Postclassic times was made possible by a vibrant, well-established exchange network that included Lamanai and a number of smaller Postclassic sites in northern Belize.

Lamanai's key location on the New River Lagoon provided the site's inhabitants with access to a variety of Mesoamerican trade goods throughout of the site's 3500-year occupation. Copper objects such as bells, rings, and tweezers not only had great economic value but were also highly charged symbolic objects whose sounds and colors made them particularly important for use in ritual performances and as ornaments reflecting social status. More copper artifacts have been recovered at Lamanai than at any other site in the ancient Maya world. To date, a total of 187 copper artifacts have been excavated, including bells, rings, tweezers, various clothing ornaments, pins, axes, chisels, needles, and fish hooks.

== Burials ==
Lamanai copper objects all were found associated with elite burials except for one object found in a cache and one found in a midden. Copper objects were found in six of the 97 burials excavated in these two structures.

== Copper metallurgy ==
Evidence for onsite copper metallurgy at Lamanai consists of ingots, pigs, blanks, sheet pieces, mis-cast objects, and casting debris. Pigs are the product of pouring remainder metal from a cast out to cool; in contrast to ingots, pigs are usually not formed into standardized or even semi-standardized shapes or sizes. The discussion of the forms and styles of copper artifacts from Lamanai follows Pendergast's (1962) typology of metal artifacts in Mesoamerica. This classification is based on the division of objects into one of three major functional categories: utilitarian objects, objects of personal adornment, and ceremonial objects Dating of these metal artifacts is based primarily on their association with stylistically diagnostic ceramic forms. (Pendergast 1962: 521).

== Jaguar, Mask and High temples ==
At the site are structures that date from AD 625: The Jaguar Temple, named for its boxy jaguar decoration; the Mask Temple, adorned by a 13-foot stone mask of an ancient Maya king; and the High Temple, offering visitors a panoramic view from its summit.

The most interesting features at the structure are two masks that decorate the west facade of the temple. The masks are on two levels on the south side of a central stairway, on the lower level the masks more than 15 feet high. It represents a rather humanized face and is bordered by decorative elements. The headdress of the mask represents a crocodile. These masks are construed of stone armature covered with thick stucco into which the details are carved. The masks date to the late fifth to the early sixth century. At Lamanai, ceremonialism was strongly developed, providing evidence of ruling authority with tight control over the populace.

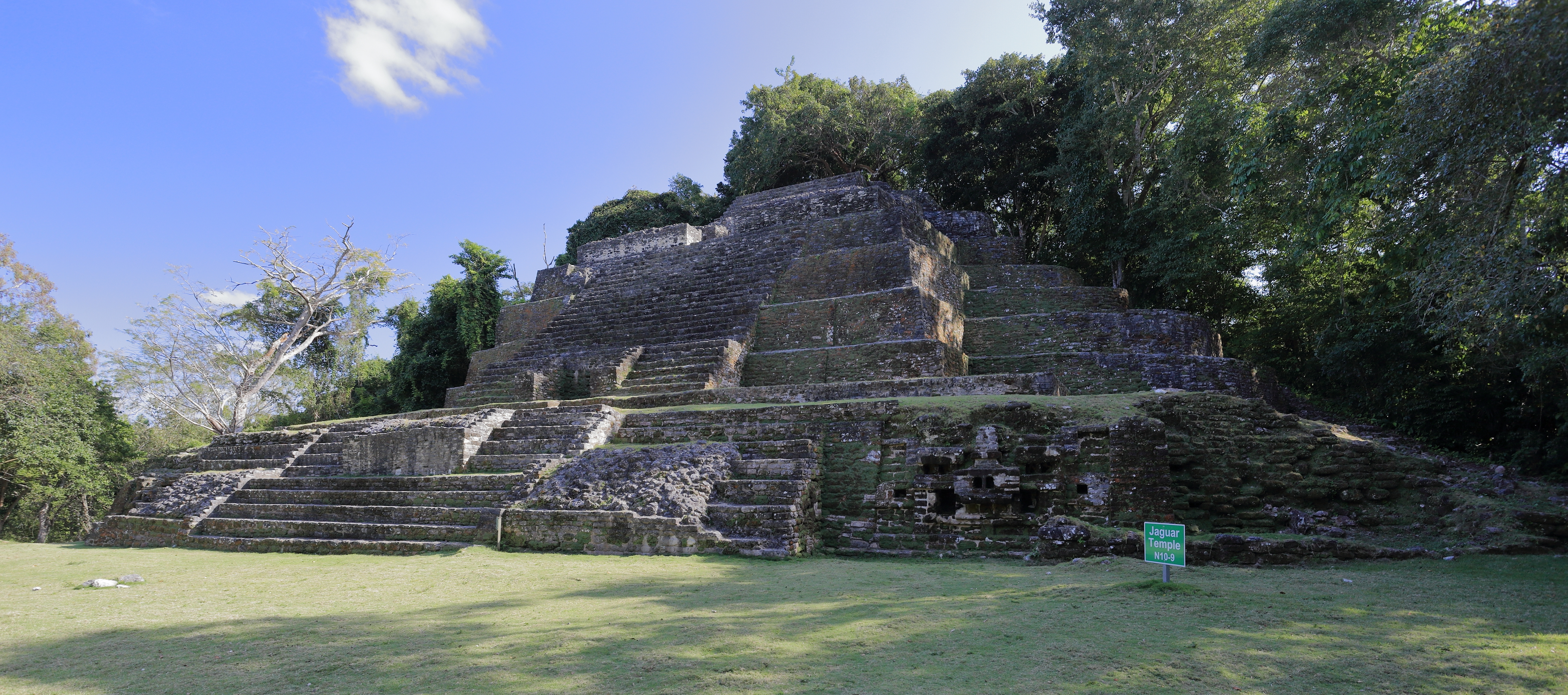
Temple of the jaguar, Lamanai

At the large temple there was a single ball court, where an offering had been placed under its giant central marker. A lidded bowl contained 100 g of crystalline hematite, 19 g of cinnabar in a miniature vessel, and other objects such as jade, shell, and pearl, all atop of a pool of mercury. Previously mercury had been found at Copan, Quirigua, and at Kaminaljuyo and lake Amtitlan, but not in such large quantity. This large amount of mercury found at the site of Lamanai had been probably collected for ritual use. Ceramics were also found at the site and gradually adopted new styles. Unfortunately, by the end of the Classic period, the norm here for burial custom was to smash vessels prior to interment.

== Archaeological investigations ==
The first detailed description of the ruins was made in 1917 by Thomas Gann. Archaeological excavations at the site began in 1974 under David M. Pendergast of the Royal Ontario Museum, which continued through 1988. Further excavations and restoration work is being conducted as of 2004. The ruins are being excavated by a team from the nearby villages of Indian Church and San Carlos. The current project is co-directed by Elizabeth Graham (Institute of Archaeology, University College London) and Scott Simmons (University of North Carolina at Wilmington). Since 2006 research at the site has been directed mostly towards artifact analysis. Major excavations will resume when funding for more artifact processing, analyses and storage is acquired.

== Modern site and tourism ==
Lamanai is accessible to tourists by organized day boat trips from Orange Walk Town along the New River, or by dirt and gravel road through the Mennonite area of Shipyard. A small museum exhibits local artifacts and provides a historical overview. Tourist facilities and small shops are available.

== Gallery ==
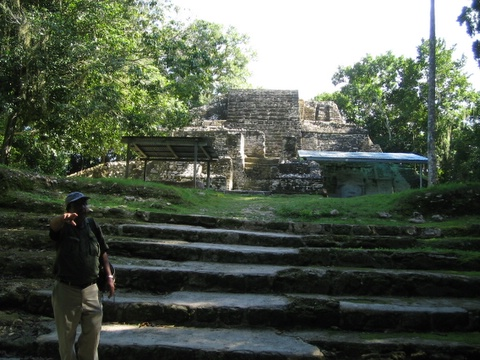
Mask Temple - Lamanai

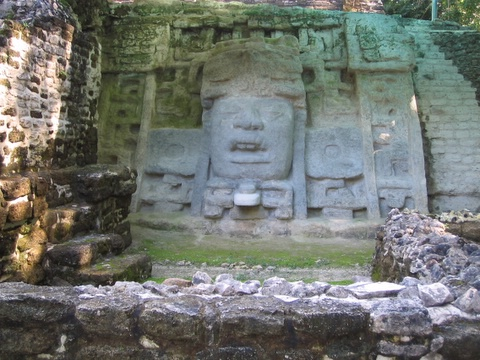
Detail of carving on right-hand (facing temple) wall of Mask Temple. A similarly sized panel on the left-hand side is covered up for its protection.

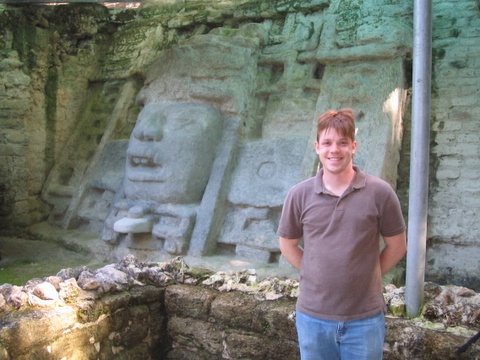
5 ft 8 in tall person in front of Mask Temple wall, for perspective.

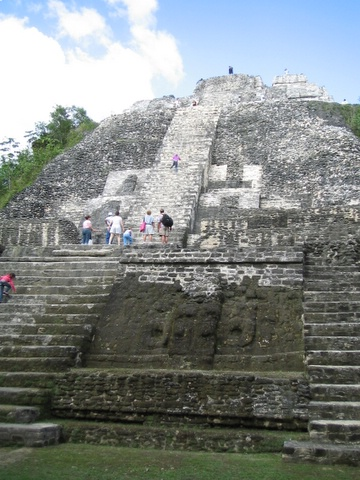
High Temple, Lamanai

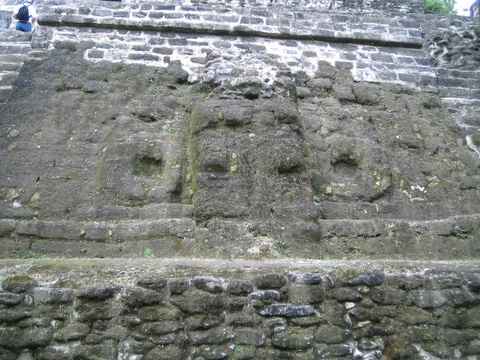
Detail from front wall (right side facing front) of the High Temple. Heavily eroded.

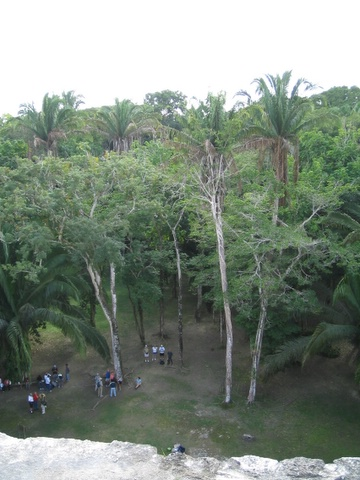
View from the top of the High Temple, to illustrate height.

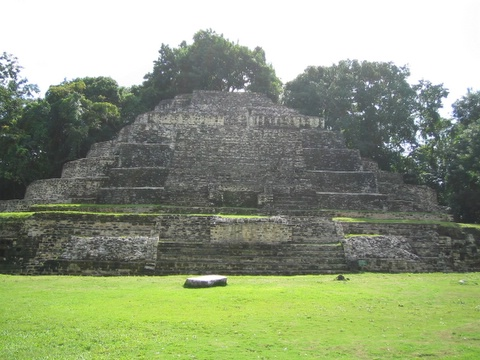
Temple of the Jaguar Masks

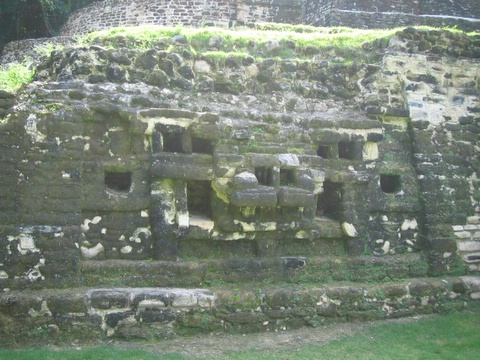
Temple of the Jaguar Masks - detail of what is believed to be a jaguar head, left-hand side of temple (when facing its front).

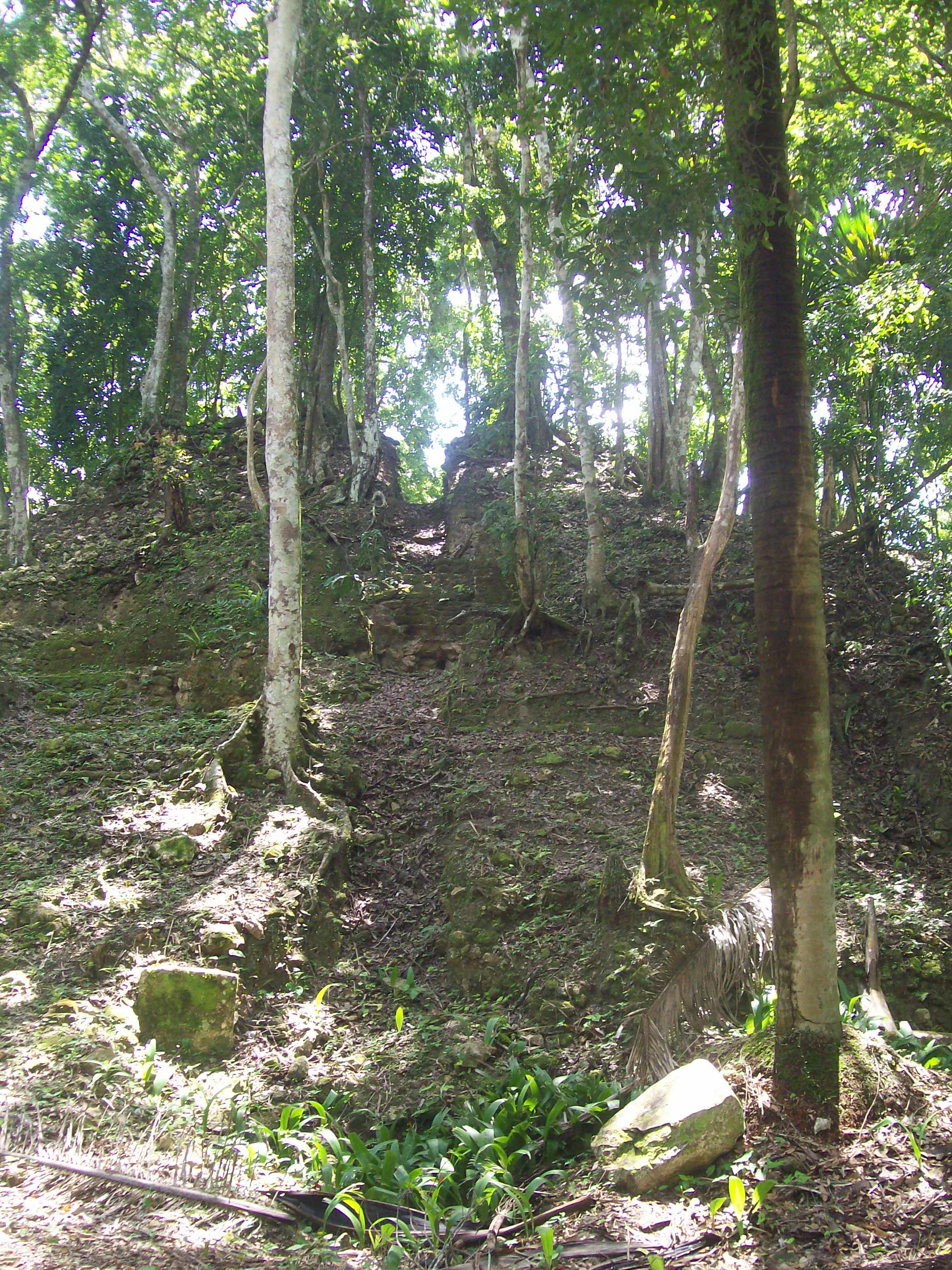
Unexplored temple mound south of the High Temple, Lamanai

== See also ==
- List of Mesoamerican pyramids
