= Indian Church, Belize =

Indian Church
- Location within Belize
- Coordinates: 17°46′N 88°39′W
- Country: Belize
- District: Orange Walk District

Population (2010)
  - Total: 267
- Time zone: UTC-6 (Central)
- Climate: Am

Indian Church is a small remote village in the Orange Walk District of Belize. It is located on the west bank of New River, neighbouring the town of San Carlos to its south, and the Maya ruins of Lamanai to its north. According to the 2010 census, Indian Church has a population of 267 people in 66 households. The village is named for the historic Spanish churches recovered among the ancient Maya ruins. The residents lived among the ruins until 1991 when the Government of Belize established the 2-square-mile (5.2 km^{2}) Lamanai Archaeological Reserve maintained by Belize's Institute of Archaeology.

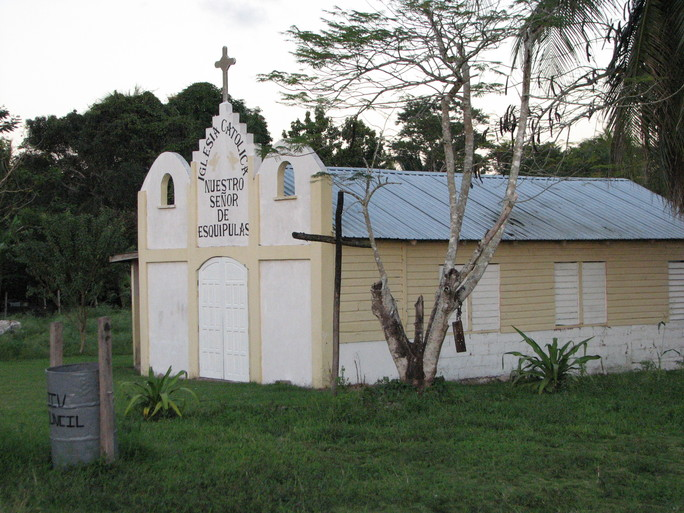
Catholic church in Indian Church Village, Belize
