= Alfredo Barrera Vásquez =

Mexican Mayan scholar (1900-1980)

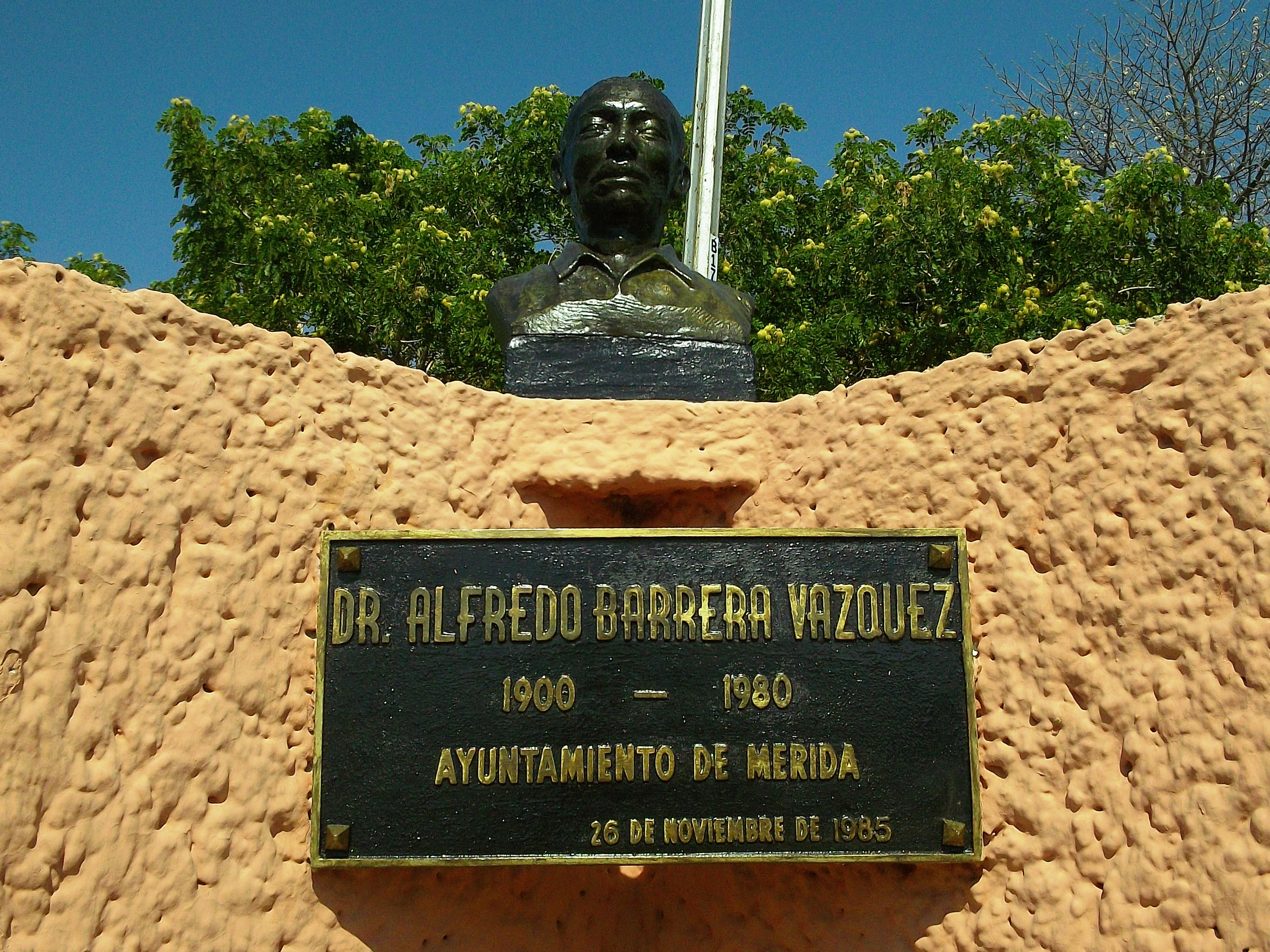
Bust of Alfredo Barrera Vásquez.

Alfredo Barrera Vázquez (1900—December 28, 1980) was a Mexican anthropologist, linguist, academic and Mayanist scholar. He is noted for both his research into the historical Maya civilization of the pre-Columbian era and his contributions promoting literacy in Mayan languages and the culture of contemporary Maya peoples. He has been described as "...perhaps the greatest Maya scholar to emerge from the actual land of the Maya."

== Biography ==
His parents were Narciso Barrera Madera and Eloísa Vásquez Bolívar. He was bilingual in both Yucatec Maya and Spanish from his childhood. At a young age he traveled to Europe where he went to finish his secondary education.

In 1917 he returned to Mérida, Yucatán to begin studying at the state’s School of Fine Arts, two years later he went to Mexico City to continue studying painting and engraving, as well as entering the National Normal School of Teachers. In 1922 he came back to Mérida and taught at the School of Fine Arts and the Faculty of Engineering. From 1927 to 1932 he continued his studies in Philosophy and Letters in Mexico City, and traveled to Spain to study Spanish literature.
