= David M. Pendergast =

American archaeologist (born 1934)

David Michael Pendergast, FRSC (born 1934) is an American archaeologist, and is most famous for his work at Altun Ha and Lamanai, Belize. He received a Bachelor of Arts in anthropology in 1955 from the University of California, Berkeley, and earned his Ph.D. in 1961 at the University of California, Los Angeles, studying with Clement Meighan. He was later married to Elizabeth Graham, also a Mesoamerican Archaeologist.

== Career ==
While pursuing his doctorate at UCLA, Pendergast became the Museum Curator in the Department of Anthropology at the University of Utah, where he later became assistant professor of anthropology. In 1957, he conducted reconnaissance work and excavations at Tikal, Guatemala, and in the following years supervised and excavated several sites throughout California, Mexico, Arizona, Utah, as well as Belize and later Cuba.

He began excavations as field director of the Royal Ontario Museum’s Altun Ha Expedition in British Honduras in 1964. Excavations commenced at Altun Ha after reconnaissance and test excavations were conducted by Pendergast in 1963, and excavation continued through 1971. In his excavations of Structure B4 he discovered several tombs, one of which was famously called the Sun God's Tomb which yielded the Kinich Ahaw Jade Head which is the single largest piece of carved jade in Mesoamerica and a national symbol of Belize.

Pendergast served as the acting Archaeological Commissioner of Belize in 1967. The following year (1968) he became the Associate Curator of the Royal Ontario Museum (ROM), and in 1977, he became the Curator of the Department of New World Archaeology at ROM.

Between 1974 and 1986, Pendergast directed the archaeological research projects at Lamanai, Belize, constructing the site's chronology. The site's core was fully mapped in the first two field seasons. Preliminary excavations revealed the presence of a raised-field system immediately north of the site's core, and excavations of Group N revealed much of the site's early history Pendergast's excavations demonstrated continuous occupation at the site from the Middle Preclassic (900-400 B.C.), until A.D. 1675. Elizabeth Graham now runs the Lamanai Archaeological Project.

From 1989 to 1993, Pendergast served on the editorial board of Ancient Mesoamerica, in 1992 as the Editor Designate of Latin American Antiquity, which he edited from 1993 to 1996, and from 1996 to 1999 served as Vice President of Collections and Research at ROM.

He currently serves as the Adjunct Curator of the Ancient Americas at the Gardiner Museum of Ceramic Art, Curator Emeritus at ROM, and is an Honorary Senior Research Associate at the Institute of Archaeology at University College of London.

== Awards ==
Fellow, Royal Society of Canada (Elected 1992)

== Selected publications ==
1960 Distribution of metal artifacts in prehispanic Mesoamerica. Doctoral Dissertation. University of California, Los Angeles.
1967 Palenque: The Walker-Caddy Expedition to the Ancient Maya City, 1839-1840. University of Oklahoma Press, Norman.
1969 Altun Ha: A Guidebook to the Ancient Maya Ruins. University of Toronto Press.
1969 The Prehistory of Actun Balam, British Honduras. Royal Ontario Museum Art and Archaeology Occasional Papers 16.
1969 Altun Ha, British Honduras (Belize): The Sun God’s Tomb. ROM Art and Archaeology Occasional Papers 19.
1970 A. H. Anderson’s Excavations at Rio Frio Cave E, British Honduras (Belize). ROM Art and Archaeology Occasional Papers 20.
1970 Excavations at Eduardo Quiroz Cave, British Honduras (Belize). ROM Art and Archaeology Occasional Papers 21.
1974 Excavations at Actun Polbilche, Belize. Royal Ontario Museum Archaeology Monographs 1.
1976 Altun Ha: A Guidebook to the Ancient Maya Ruins (Second Edition, Revised). University of Toronto Press.
1979 Excavations at Altun Ha, Belize, 1964-1970, Volume 1. Royal Ontario Museum.
1982 Ancient Maya Mercury. Science 217:533-535.
1982 Excavations at Altun Ha, Belize, 1964-1970, Volume 2. Royal Ontario Museum.
1984 A Lexicon for Maya Architecture (second author with H. Stanley Loten). Royal Ontario Museum Archaeology Monographs 8.
1985 Under Spanish Rule: The Final Chapter in Lamanai's Maya History. Belcast Journal of Belizean Affairs 3(1&2):1-7. Belize College of Arts, Science, and Technology, Belize City.
1988 Lamanai Stela 9: The Archaeological Context. Research Reports on Ancient Maya Writing 20. Center for Maya Research, Washington, D.C.
1990 Excavations at Altun Ha, Belize, 1964-1970, Volume 3. Royal Ontario Museum.
1998 The House in the Water. Rotunda 31(2):26-31.
2000 "The Maya World: Gains and Losses." Canadian Society of Decorative Arts Bulletin 18(1&2):12-13.
2002 "Temporal change, social structure and diet in the Altun Ha Maya" (third author with Christine White and Fred J. Longstaffe). Canadian Association for Physical Anthropology Newsletter 2002(1): 31.
2006 Reconstructing the Past: Studies in Mesoamerican and Central American Prehistory, edited by David M. Pendergast and Anthony P. Andrews. BAR International Series 1529. BAR, Oxford.

== Selected peer reviewed articles ==
1957 "Further Data On Pacific Coast Fired Clay Figurines." American Antiquity 23:178-180.
1967 "Altun Ha, Honduras Británica: Temporadas 1964 y 1965." Estudios de Cultura Maya VI:149-169.
1968 "Four Maya Pottery Vessels from British Honduras." American Antiquity 33:379-382.
1970 "Evidence of Early Teotihuacán-Lowland Maya Contact at Altun Ha." American Antiquity 36:455-460.
1981 "The 1980 Excavations at Lamanai, Belize." Mexicon 2:96-99.
1988 "Lamanai Tomb N9-56/1: Analysis of the Skeletal Evidence." (second author with Hermann Helmuth). Ossa 13:109-117.
1990 "Engineering Problems in Ancient Maya Architecture: Past, Present, and Future." Environmental Geology and Water Sciences 16(1):67-73
1995 "Looting the Maya World: The Other Losers." Public Archaeology Review 2(2):2-4.
2000 "Excavations at Los Buchillones, Cuba." (second author with Elizabeth Graham, Jorge Calvera, and Juan Jardines). Antiquity 74:263-264.
2002 "The Houses in Which They Dwelt: Excavation and Dating of Taino Wooden Structures at Los Buchillones, Cuba." (first author with Elizabeth Graham, Jorge Calvera R., and Juan Jardines M.) Journal of Wetland Archaeology 2:61-75.

== Reference materials ==
1999 Holding Onto the Past: Maya Storytelling in Belize. In Traditional Storytelling Today: An International Sourcebook, edited by Margaret Read MacDonald, pp. 471–474. Fitzroy Dearborn, Chicago.
2001 Altun Ha (Belize, Belize) and Lamanai (Orange Walk, Belize) in Susan T. Evans and David L. Webster (eds.), Archaeology of Ancient Mexico and Central America, An Encyclopedia, pp. 19, 394. Garland Publishing, New York.
