= High Temple =

Temple in Belize

The High Temple is an ancient Mayan temple at the Lamanai archaeological site in Orange Walk District, Belize.

The High Temple's highest exposed height of 33 metres (108 ft) cannot be climbed even in the presence of a tour guide, due to an incident in which a woman was hospitalized with a severe spinal fracture, leaving her unable to walk. The view from the top allows the climber to see over the jungle and to see a large portion of the New River lagoon. The Temple itself is believed to date back over 2000 years and was used as a religious platform for the local tribes to gather.

== See also ==
- Maya ruins of Belize
- Pre-Columbian Belize
- List of tallest structures built before the 20th century
