= Elizabeth Graham (academic) =

Professor of Mesoamerican Archaeology

Prof Elizabeth Graham
- Occupation: Archaeologist

Academic background
- Education: University of Cambridge

Elizabeth Graham is a professor of Mesoamerican Archaeology at UCL. She has worked, for decades, on the Maya civilization, both in prehispanic and colonial times, specifically in Belize. She has recently turned her attention to Maya Dark Earths, and conducts pioneering work in the Maya region as dark earths have mostly been studied in the Amazonia. She particularly focuses on how human occupation (domestic and industrial waste, burials, abandoned houses and processing sites) influences soil formation and production.

== Education ==
Graham completed a BA in history at the University of Rhode Island in 1970. She obtained a Phd in Archaeology from the University of Cambridge in 1983, entitled The Highlands of the Lowlands: Environment and Archaeology in the Stann Creek District, Belize, Central America.

== Career ==
From 1978 to 1980, Graham was the Archaeological Commissioner in Belize. During this time she orchestrated the international training of colleagues in Belize .

During the 1980s, she conducted coastal surveys in the Stann Creek District region of Belize. In the late 1980s she commenced work on Postclassic site at Lamanai. She has also conducted excavations at Negroman-Tipu, Belize. Graham directs excavations at Lamanai on the New River Lagoon in Belize, and at Marco Gonzalez, on Ambergris Caye. Recent work has focused on mission churches from the early Spanish colonial period.

In the late 1980s, Graham was a Canada Research Fellow at York University, Ontario as well as a research associate in New World Archaeology at the Royal Ontario Museum. Graham joined UCL in 1999.

Graham has written on Mesoamerican archaeology in the Guardian, Apollo Magazine, and the Conversation. She is a member of the Editorial Advisory Board of the archaeology journal Antiquity.

== Awards and honours ==
Graham was elected as a Fellow of the Society of Antiquaries of London in 2003.

== Selected publications ==
=== Books ===
- E. Graham 1994. The highlands of the lowlands: environment and archaeology in the Stann Creek District, Belize Central America. Prehistory Press & Royal Ontario Museum.
- E. Graham 2011. Maya Christians and their churches in sixteenth-century Belize. University Press of Florida.

=== Book chapters ===
- E. Graham 1989. Brief Synthesis of Coastal Site Data from Colson Point, Placencia, and Marco Gonzalez, Belize. In H. McKillop and P. F. Healy (eds) Coastal Maya Trade, pp. 135–154. Peterborough (CA): Trent University.
- E. Graham 2004. Lamanai Reloaded: Alive and Well in the Early Postclassic. In Awe, J., Morris, J., and Jones, S. (eds) Research Reports in Belizean Archaeology Volume I, pp. 223–241. Belmopan, Belize: National Institute of Culture and History.
- Howie, L., Powis, T. G., and E. Graham (2016). Sitting on the Dock of the Bay: Ceramic Connections between Lamanai and the Chetumal Bay Area over More than Two Millennia. In D. S. Walker (ed) Perspectives on the Ancient Maya of Chetumal Bay, pp. 162–185. Tampa: University Press of Florida.

=== Journal articles ===
- E. Graham 1987. Resource diversity in Belize and its implications for models of lowland trade. American Antiquity 52(4): 753–767.
- E. Graham and D. Pendergast 1987. Cays to the Kingdom. Archaeological Newsletter from the Royal Ontario Museum 11 (18), pp. 1–4.
- E. Graham and D. Pendergast 1989. Excavations at the Marco Gonzalez Site, Ambergris Cay, Belize, 1986, Journal of Field Archaeology, 16(1), pp. 1–16.
- E. Graham, David M. Pendergast, and Grant D. Jones. 1989 On the fringes of conquest: Maya-Spanish contact in colonial Belize. Science 246.4935: 1254–1259.
- E. Graham 2000. Collapse, conquest and Maya survival at Lamanai, Belize. Archaeology International 4: 52–56.
- E. Graham, S. E. Simmons & C. D. White (2013). The Spanish conquest and the Maya collapse: how 'religious' is change? World Archaeology 45 (1): 161–185.
- Lentz, D. L., Graham, E., Vinaja, X., Slotten, V., and R. Jain (2016). Agroforestry and ritual at the ancient Maya centre of Lamanai. Journal of Archaeological Science Reports 8: 284–294.
- E. Graham et al. 2017. The Marco Gonzalez Maya site, Ambergris Caye, Belize: Assessing the impact of human activities by examining diachronic processes at the local scale. Quaternary International 437, pp. 115–142.
- E. Graham et al. 2017 The Marco Gonzalez Maya site, Ambergris Caye, Belize: Assessing the impact of human activities by examining diachronic processes at the local scale. Quaternary International 437: 115 - 142.
- E. Graham 2018. Do You Believe in Magic? Material Religion 14:
