= David Freidel =

American archaeologist

- Born: 1946 (age 79–80)

Academic background
- Education: Harvard University (BA); Harvard University (PhD)
- Thesis: Late Postclassic Settlement Patterns on Cozumel Island, Quintana Roo, Mexico (1976)
- Doctoral advisor: Gordon Willey; Jeremy Sabloff

Academic work
- Discipline: Archaeology
- Institutions: Southern Methodist University; Washington University in St. Louis
- Doctoral students: Vernon L. Scarborough

David Alan Freidel (born 1946) is an American archaeologist whose research focuses on the ancient Maya. He is best known for his long-term archaeological field projects at Cerros (Cerro Maya) in Belize, Yaxuná in the Yucatán, and El Perú-Waka' in Guatemala, and for the widely read books he co-authored with epigrapher Linda Schele. He is Professor Emeritus of Archaeology at Washington University in St. Louis, where he held a full professorship from 2008 until his retirement.

== Early life and education ==
Freidel went to the field for the first time in 1963, working as an excavator on the Harvard–National Geographic Society Hell Gap Project in Wyoming, directed by J. O. Brew, Cynthia Irwin-Williams, and Henry Irwin. He returned to the project in 1964, and also participated in excavations directed by the University of Bordeaux in southwestern France in 1966. Freidel graduated magna cum laude from Harvard College in 1968 with a B.A. in Anthropology.

Following graduation he served in the Peace Corps from 1968 to 1970 in Iran, where he conducted survey work on Palaeolithic through Sassanian period sites in the Kazeroon Valley, Fars Province. He returned to Harvard for doctoral study, initially working with C. C. Lamberg-Karlovsky before switching to Maya studies and training under Gordon Willey and Jeremy Sabloff. He earned his Ph.D. in Anthropology from Harvard University in 1976, with a dissertation on late Postclassic settlement patterns on Cozumel Island, Quintana Roo, Mexico.

== Career ==
=== Southern Methodist University ===
Freidel joined the Department of Anthropology at Southern Methodist University in 1974 as an adjunct assistant professor and rose through the ranks to full professor by 1991. From 2002 until his departure in 2007 he held the title of University Distinguished Professor. He served as acting chair of the Anthropology department (1998–99), director of graduate studies (1999), and president of the SMU Faculty Senate (1989–90). In 2007 he received the Laurence Perrine Award for Outstanding Teaching and Scholarship from the Phi Beta Kappa chapter at SMU.

In a 2008 article in D Magazine, Freidel revealed that he was unhappy at SMU and strongly criticized the Board of Trustees for its management of the Dedman College of Humanities and Sciences.

=== Washington University in St. Louis ===
In 2008, Freidel received a full professorship in the Department of Anthropology at Washington University in St. Louis, where he subsequently became professor emeritus.

== Archaeological field projects ==
=== Cozumel (1971–1973) ===
Freidel's dissertation research grew out of survey and reconnaissance work he conducted on Cozumel Island beginning in 1971 as part of the Harvard–Arizona Cozumel Project directed by Jeremy Sabloff and William Rathje. This work resulted in his co-authored book Cozumel: Late Maya Settlement Patterns (1984) with Sabloff.

=== Cerros, Belize (1974–1982) ===
Freidel directed excavations at Cerros (Cerro Maya), a Late Preclassic coastal site in northern Belize, from 1974 to 1982, initially as the Cerro Maya Project and later under National Science Foundation grants. His team's work established that the site dated to the Late Preclassic period (approximately 400 BC – AD 250) and documented evidence of early divine kingship, monumental architecture, and long-distance trade in jade and obsidian. According to his professional biography, Freidel was the youngest recipient of a senior National Science Foundation grant in archaeology at the time of this work. The excavations generated over 300,000 artifacts, and Freidel supervised multiple doctoral dissertations based on the Cerros collections. In 2009, Freidel arranged the transfer of the Cerros collection to the Florida Museum of Natural History for long-term curation and scholarly access.

=== Yaxuná, Yucatán (1986–1996) ===
In 1986, Freidel initiated the Yaxuna Archaeological Survey, directing field seasons through 1996 with support from the National Geographic Society, the National Endowment for the Humanities, and the Selz Foundation. Research at Yaxuná examined the site's role in the conflicts between northern lowland polities, including its relationship to Chichén Itzá.

=== El Perú-Waka', Guatemala (2003–present) ===
In 2003, Freidel co-directed the El Perú-Waka' Archaeological Project with Guatemalan archaeologist Héctor Escobedo, launching a long-term investigation of the ancient royal city of El Perú (Waka') in northwestern Petén, Guatemala, located within Laguna del Tigre National Park. The Waka' kingdom, established around 100 BC, served as the capital of a dynasty that endured for more than five hundred years and included more than twenty-six rulers before collapsing in the early ninth century. The site commanded strategic trade routes along the San Pedro Martír River and overland connections to the central Yucatán lowlands. Major research themes include dynastic history, Maya religion and ritual, political economy, and the site's relationships with imperial powers including Siyaj Kʼahkʼ in the fourth century and Yuknoom Chʼeen II in the seventh century. The project has been supported by the National Geographic Society, the Waitt Foundation, the PACUNAM Foundation, and the U.S. Department of the Interior, among other funders.

In 2012, Freidel's team made one of the project's most significant discoveries: the tomb of Lady K'abel (K'abel), a seventh-century Maya ruler described as one of the great queens of Classic Maya civilization. K'abel, who carried the title Kaloomte (Supreme Warrior), served as the military governor of the Wak kingdom for the imperial Snake King dynasty and held authority superior to that of her husband, King K'inich Bahlam, during their joint reign from 672 to 692 AD. The tomb was discovered by project excavator Olivia Navarro-Farr, a former doctoral student of Freidel's, during excavations of a ritually prominent temple that had received devotional attention for generations after the dynasty's fall. The El Perú-Waka' site is located within Laguna del Tigre National Park, a biosphere reserve in northwestern Guatemala, and the project has faced challenges arising from the area's complex political ecology.

In the mid-2000s, Freidel and other archaeologists working in the region attracted national media coverage—from National Geographic, National Public Radio, and U.S. News & World Report—largely framing the situation as a conflict with drug traffickers and illegal settlers. A 2008 investigation by D Magazine offered a more nuanced account, reporting that many of the farmers encroaching on the park were landless agricultural workers with legitimate grievances unrelated to drug trafficking, and that Freidel and his colleagues found themselves caught in a broader regional land dispute. Freidel canceled the 2008 field season as conditions deteriorated. He has also articulated an aspiration to help establish a permanent research facility at the site and to eventually transfer stewardship of the project to Guatemalan archaeologists and local communities, describing El Perú-Waka' as the last field site of his career.

== Collaboration with Linda Schele ==
Beginning in 1979, Freidel began a productive scholarly collaboration with art historian and epigrapher Linda Schele that continued until her death in 1998. Together they published articles and two major books integrating archaeological, epigraphic, and iconographic evidence to reconstruct ancient Maya history and religion. Their first co-authored book, A Forest of Kings: The Untold Story of the Ancient Maya (William Morrow, 1990), was described at the 25th anniversary of its publication as a landmark work that synthesized the explosion of epigraphic research emerging from the Palenque Mesa Redonda meetings and made it accessible to both scholars and a broad lay audience. The Italian translation of A Forest of Kings won the Gambrinus Giuseppe Mazzotti Literary Prize in 2000. Their second book, Maya Cosmos: Three Thousand Years on the Shaman's Path (William Morrow, 1993), co-authored with Joy Parker, explored Maya cosmology and shamanic practice through a similarly interdisciplinary lens.
