= Perine =

Perine is a surname. Notable people with the name include:

- Edward Martineau Perine (1809–1905), American merchant and planter
- George Edward Perine (1837–1885), American artist, engraver, and publisher
- Kelly Perine (born 1969), American television actor
- La'Mical Perine (born 1998), American football player
- Samaje Perine (born 1995), American football player and running back for the Cincinnati Bengals

== See also ==
- Perrine (disambiguation)
- Perin (disambiguation)
- Billiou-Stillwell-Perine House, the oldest extant house on Staten Island, New York
