= Perrine =

Perrine may refer to:

== Places ==
- Perrine, Florida, an unincorporated community
- Perrine Bridge, Twin Falls, Idaho, United States; named after I. B. Perrine
- Perrine's Bridge, near Rifton, New York, United States
- Perrine Road Bridge, Larkin Township, Michigan
- Perrine (crater), an impact crater on the Moon

== Other uses ==
- Perrine (name), a list of people and fictional characters with the surname or given name
- Perrine, a restaurant at The Pierre hotel, New York City
- The Story of Perrine, an anime series
- 18D/Perrine–Mrkos, a comet

== See also ==
- Perine (disambiguation)
