= Perrine (name) =

Perrine is both used as a female given name and as a surname. The name is derived from the French word pierre, stone. Notable people with the name include:

== Surname ==
- Perrine (music theorist) (died after 1698), French music theorist and lute teacher
- Bull Perrine (1877–1915), American baseball umpire
- Charles Dillon Perrine (1867–1951), American-Argentine astronomer
- Henry Perrine (1797–1840), American physician, horticulturist, United States Consul in Campeche, Mexico
- I. B. Perrine (1861–1943), American farmer, rancher and businessman
- Laurence Perrine, American scholar of English-language literature
- Melissa Perrine (born 1988), Australian visually impaired para-alpine skier
- Nig Perrine (1885–1948), American baseball infielder
- Valerie Perrine (1943–2026), American actress
- Van Dearing Perrine (1869–1955), American Impressionist painter

== Given name ==
- Perrine Delacour (born 1994), French golfer
- Perrine Goulet (born 1978), French politician
- Perrine Laffont (born 1998), French mogul skier
- Perrine Leblanc (born 1980), Canadian writer
- Pérrine Moncrieff (1893–1979), New Zealand author, conservationist and amateur ornithologist
- Perrine Pelen (born 1960), French alpine ski racer

== Fictional characters ==
- Perrine H. Clostermann, a character from the media franchise Strike Witches

== See also ==
- Perine, a surname
