= Daniel Perrin =

Settler of Staten Island (1642–1719)

Coat of arms of Daniel Perrin

Daniel Perrin (1642–1719) was one of the first permanent European inhabitants of Staten Island, New York. Known as "The Huguenot", he arrived in New York Harbor from the Isle of Jersey on July 29, 1665, aboard the ship Philip, under the command of Philip Carteret. He lived in Elizabethtown, part of the Elizabethtown Tract (now Elizabeth, New Jersey) for a while before moving across the Arthur Kill and settling on Staten Island. In 1692 he was granted 80 acres (320,000 m^{2}) of land by Governor Benjamin Fletcher in an area along the south shore of Staten Island then known as Smoking Point. During the American Revolutionary War this area was referred to as the Blazing Star, and is now known as Rossville.

Daniel Perrin was married to Maria Thorel, of Rouen, France, on February 18, 1666. They had five sons and one daughter; Peter, b. 1667, Henry, b. 1669, James, b. 1670, Daniel, b. 1672, William, b. 1673, and Francyntje, b. 1675. He also had three daughters from a second marriage to a woman named Elizabeth. The daughters names are Sara, Elizabet, and Mary. Perrin died on Staten Island after September 6, 1719.

The Staten Island neighborhood of Huguenot is named after him and the other Huguenots who settled in the area during the late 17th century and early 18th centuries.

== Notable descendants ==
- The Perine Brothers of Doon, Ontario
- Edward Martineau Perine
- George Edward Perine
- Charles Dillon Perrine
- Henry Perrine
- I. B. Perrine
- Laurence Perrine
- Valerie Perrine
