= St. Luke's Episcopal Church (Cahaba, Alabama) =

Historic church in Alabama, United States

- U.S. National Register of Historic Places
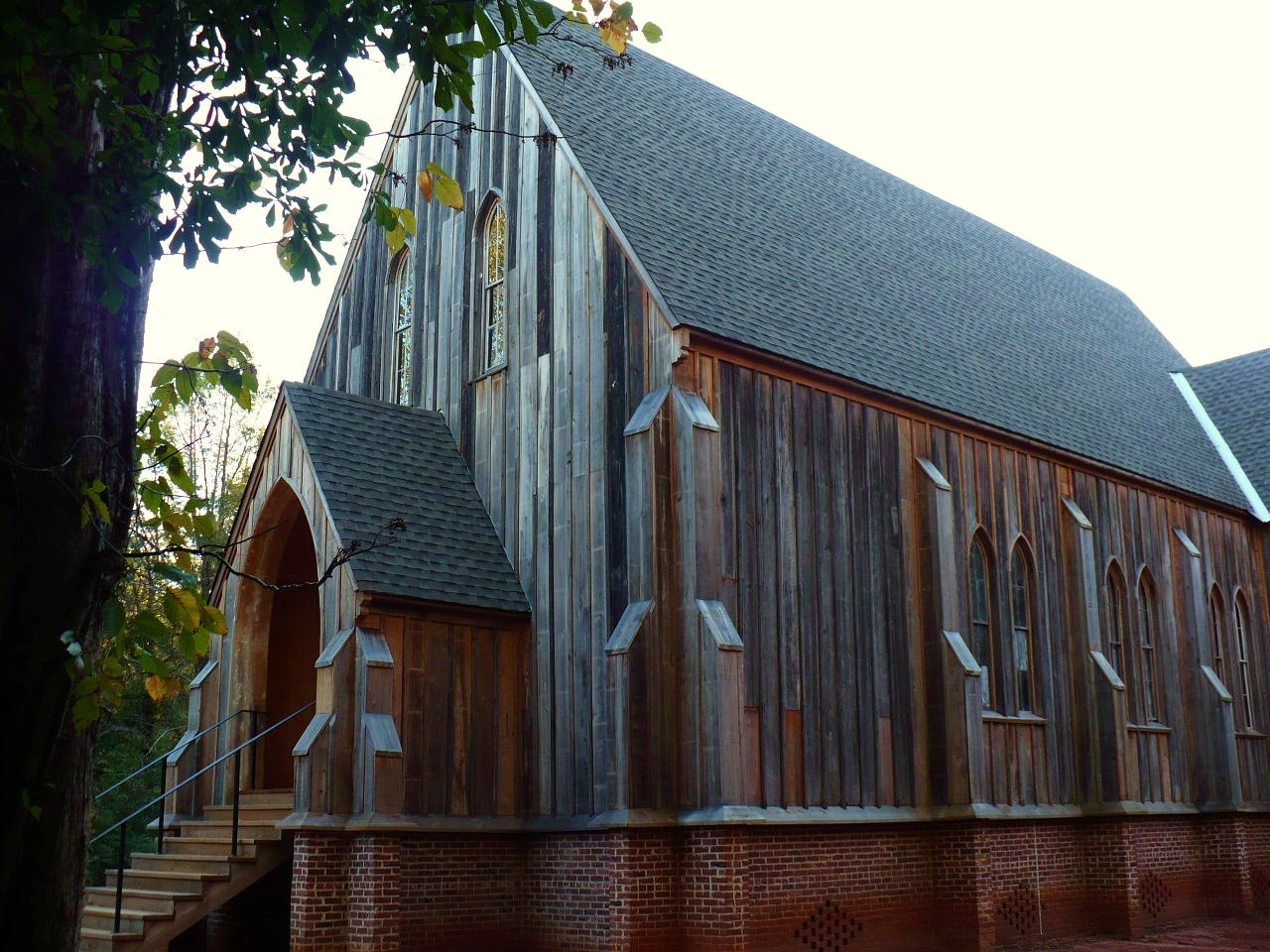
- St. Luke's Episcopal Church at Cahaba in 2010

- Location within Alabama Location within the United States
- Location: Cahaba, Alabama, United States
- Coordinates: 32°19′9″N 87°6′19″W
- Built: 1854, moved 1876 & 2006–2007
- NRHP reference No.: 82002008
- Added to NRHP: March 25, 1982

St. Luke's Episcopal Church is a historic Carpenter Gothic church built in 1850s at Cahaba, Alabama, the state’s first capital from 1820 to 1826. The unknown builder closely followed plans published by architect Richard Upjohn in his 1852 book Rural Architecture.

The Gothic Revival structure features lancet windows, pointed arch doorways, and vertical board and batten sheathing. The building originally had a square bell tower at the front corner, but it was not rebuilt when the church was relocated in 1878 to Martin's Station. The church was disassembled and relocated to Cahaba in 2007, where it was reassembled at Old Cahawba Archaeological Park.

== History ==
St. Luke's was first constructed in 1854, during Cahaba's antebellum boom years on Vine Street near the intersection of Vine and 1st South Street. After the town declined following the Civil War, the church was dismantled in 1878 and moved 11 miles (18 km) to the village of Martin's Station, where it was reassembled and continued to serve an Episcopal congregation for several decades. It was later used by an African-American Baptist congregation for over 60 years before being acquired by the Alabama Historical Commission. It was added to the National Register of Historic Places on March 25, 1982.

During the academic year 2006–2007, students from Auburn University's Rural Project carefully dismantled the church building so that it could be moved back to Cahaba and reassembled at Old Cahawba Archaeological Park. From 2007 to 2008 the students reassembled the building at Cahaba, near the corner of Beech Street and Capitol Street, across from the Old Cahawba Archaeological Park visitor center. This third site was chosen because the original one on Vine Street was found to be located in a floodplain. Most of the exterior work was completed by late 2009.

== See also ==
- National Register of Historic Places listings in Dallas County, Alabama
- Structure relocation
