= Cahaba Prison =

American Civil War prison in Cahaba, Alabama

Coordinates: 32.31637°N 87.09622°W

- Cahaba, Alabama, U.S.
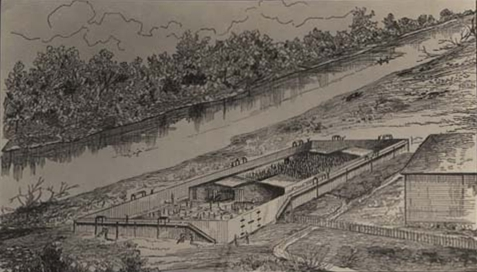
- "Castle Morgan, Cahaba, Alabama, 1863–65. Drawn from memory by the author." From Jesse Hawes' Cahaba, A Story of Captive Boys in Blue.

Site information
- Type: Confederate Prison Camp

Site history
- Built: 1863
- In use: 1863–1865
- Battles/wars: American Civil War

Cahaba Prison, also known as Castle Morgan, held prisoners of war in Dallas County, Alabama, where the Confederacy held captive Union soldiers during the American Civil War. The prison was located in the small Alabama town of Cahaba, at the confluence of the Alabama and Cahaba rivers, not far from Selma. It suffered a serious flood in 1865. At the time, Cahaba was still the county seat, but that was moved to Selma in 1866. Cahaba Prison was known for having one of the lowest death rates of any Civil War prison camp mainly because of the humane treatment from the Confederate commandant.

== History ==
The Confederate Army built a stockade around a large cotton warehouse near the Alabama River to prepare the site. Cahaba Prison was opened as such in June 1863. The commanding officer was Captain H. A. M. Henderson, a Methodist minister. The prison made use of a brick cotton warehouse built in 1860 on Arch Street, above the banks of the Alabama River. This structure covered approximately 15,000 square feet (1,400 m^{2}) and was surrounded by a larger wooden stockade. It was intended for approximately 500 prisoners, but its population had grown to 660 by August 1864. When Union General Ulysses S. Grant suspended the practice of prisoner exchange with the Confederacy, the numbers began to soar. By October 1864 the number of prisoners held here was 2,151; they had increased to more than 3,000 by March 1865.

Former prisoner Jesse Hawes describe the two men in charge by the following: Captain Howard A. M. Henderson was "remembered with kindly wishes…It was often in the power of Henderson to extend kindnesses and courtesies to prisoners, and we are glad to note that the opportunity was not infrequently embraced." But he wrote of Lieutenant-Col. Samuel Jones, "we find one whose record was a sickening blotch upon humanity...The relations between Jones and Henderson were never cordial, and at times were quite unfriendly. It was urged by one or two of the guards that Jones, when not drunk, was less brutal then he would ordinarily seem; but unfortunately for the poor wretches whose very lives depended on his moods, he was never seen by us except when intoxicated."

Jacob Rush of the 3rd Ohio Cavalry enlisted at age 15, having lied about his age. He was captured as a spy, met with General Nathan Bedford Forrest, and was sent to Cahaba Prison, arriving on October 13, 1864. While there he met Union Captain Hanchette and helped organize an escape attempt. They were successful in capturing the guards, but the demoralized condition of the prisoners resulted in a failed attempt. Confederate reinforcements came from the town and the prisoners were charged with conspiracy. Captain Hanchette refused to give up the names of the men involved, and none of the other prisoners admitted to them, either. The suspected conspirators were kept four days without rations. Jacob Rush and Jesse Hawes, M. D. later wrote first-hand accounts of the prison, the conditions, and the escape attempt.

They learned that Captain Hanchette was to be exchanged for a Confederate general confined at Vicksburg. Rush reported that Colonel Jones, who both hated and feared his victim, selected two villainous men to act as his guard, and gave them instructions to find some excuse for shooting him while taking him from Cahaba to Selma, where the exchange was to be conducted.

Captain Hanchette was taken forth from the dark dungeon, his strong frame so reduced that he was scarcely able, even under the stimulus of hope, to stand, placed in the custody of the assassins, and started toward Selma. He was shot down in cold blood before he was a mile from town, a fate perfectly in accord with a confinement rarely paralleled in the bounds of any civilized country in the nineteenth century.

The regional district commander, Lt. Col. Samuel Jones, negotiated an exchange of Union prisoners from Cahaba for captured Confederates, with the prison being evacuated in March 1865. The exchange took place at Vicksburg, Mississippi in April 9th 1865, after a long and arduous journey by the prisoners.

== Conditions ==
R. H. Whitfield, the prison surgeon, reported unhygienic conditions at the camp, citing the lack of a sanitary water supply. The warehouse building had one fireplace and 432 bunk spaces. Despite this, the death rate was about 2%, the lowest rate of any Civil War prison camp. Most Confederate camps averaged 15.5% and Union camps had mortality rates of more than 12%; most deaths were due to disease. Federal and Confederate records indicate that between 142 and 147 men died at Cahaba Prison.

The most outstanding health problem were constant outbreaks of flea infestations. Park historians believe the low death rate was mainly due to the humane treatment of the prisoners based on Capt. Henderson's Methodist beliefs. Tragically and sadly ironic, after having survived in the prisoner of war camp, once freed, many of these prisoners later died in the subsequent Sultana disaster; it sank while transporting them to the North.

== See also ==
- List of Civil War POW prisons and camps

== Bibliography ==
- Hawes, Jesse. (1888) Cahaba: A Story of Captive Boys in Blue, 1888.
- Reed, Charles B. (1925) The Curse of Cahawba.
- Hasseltine, William Best. (1930) Civil War Prisons: A Study in War Psychology.
