= Cahaba, Alabama =

Archaeological site in Alabama, United States

- Cahaba
- U.S. National Register of Historic Places
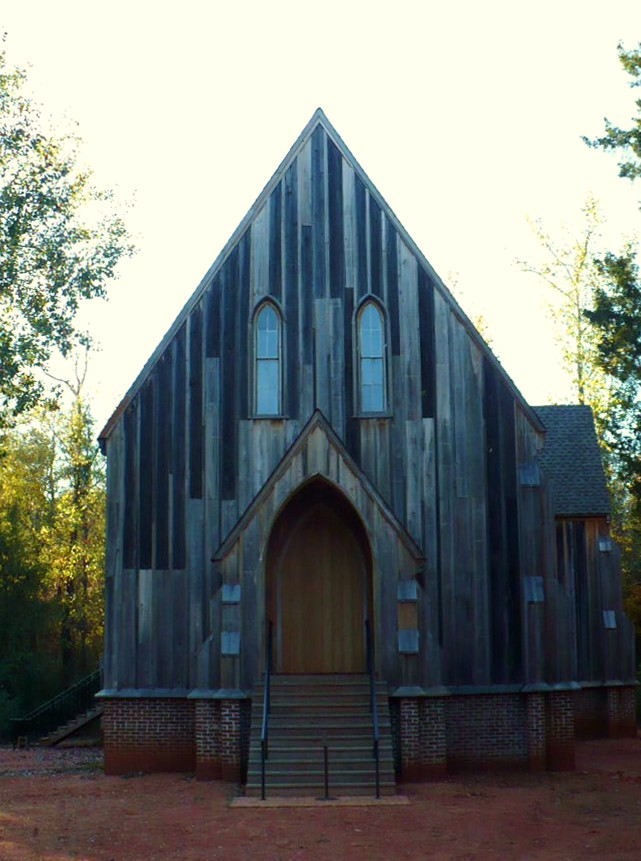
- St. Lukes Episcopal Church, built 1854 at Cahaba; moved to Martin's Station in 1878; returned to Old Cahawba in 21st century

- Location within Alabama Location within the United States
- Nearest city: Selma, Alabama
- Coordinates: 32°19′01″N 87°06′05″W
- Area: 853 acres (345 ha)
- Built: 1818
- Architect: Multiple
- NRHP reference No.: 73000341
- Added to NRHP: May 8, 1973

Cahaba, also spelled Cahawba, was the first permanent state capital of Alabama, United States, from 1820 to 1825. It was the county seat of Dallas County, Alabama until 1866. Located at the confluence of the Alabama and Cahaba rivers, the town endured regular seasonal flooding.

The state legislature moved the capital to Tuscaloosa in 1826. After Cahaba suffered another major flood in 1865, the state legislature moved the county seat northeast to Selma, which was better situated.

The former settlement became defunct after it lost the county seat, because it lost associated businesses and jobs. Many of its people moved to the new county seat. Cahaba declined rapidly, although it had been quite wealthy during the antebellum years.

It is now a ghost town and is preserved as a state historic site known as the Old Cahawba Archeological Park. The state and associated citizens' groups are working to develop it as a full interpretive park. St. Luke's Episcopal Church was returned to Old Cahawba, and a fundraising campaign is underway for its restoration.

== Demographics ==
Historical population
Census	Pop.	Note	%±
1860	1,920		—
1870	431		−77.6%
1880	384		−10.9%
U.S. Decennial Census

Cahawba was listed on the US census rolls from 1860 to 1880. It remained incorporated until as late as 1989.

== Etymology ==
The name Cahaba is thought to come from the Choctaw words oka, meaning 'water' and aba, meaning 'above'.

== History ==
=== Capital ===
Cahaba had its beginnings as an undeveloped town site at the confluence of the Alabama and Cahaba rivers. At the old territorial capital of St. Stephens, a commission was formed on February 13, 1818, to select the site for Alabama's state capital. Cahaba was the site chosen and was approved on November 21, 1818. Due to the future capital site being undeveloped, Alabama's constitutional convention took temporary accommodations in Huntsville until a statehouse could be built.

Governor William Wyatt Bibb reported in October 1819 that the town had been laid out and that lots would be auctioned to the highest bidders. The town was planned on a grid system, with streets running north and south named for trees and those running east and west named for famous men. The new statehouse was a two-story brick structure, measuring 43 feet (13 m) wide by 58 feet (18 m) long, located near Vine and Capitol streets. By 1820 Cahaba had become a functioning state capital.

Due to its lowland location at the confluence of two large rivers, Cahaba was subject to seasonal flooding. It also had a reputation for an unhealthy atmosphere, when people thought that miasma in the air caused such diseases as malaria, yellow fever, and cholera. The numerous mosquitoes carried disease.

People who were opposed to the capital's location at Cahaba used this as an argument for moving the capital to Tuscaloosa, which was approved by the legislature in January 1826. That was not a long-term success, and it was moved again in 1846 to centrally located Montgomery, Alabama.

After the relocation of the capital, Cahaba was adversely affected by the loss of state government and associated business.

=== Antebellum ===
The town served as the county seat of Dallas County for several more decades. Based on revenues from the cotton trade, the town recovered from losing the capital, and reestablished itself as a social and commercial center.

Centered in the fertile "Black Belt", Cahaba became a major distribution point for cotton shipped down the Alabama River to the Gulf port of Mobile. Successful planters and merchants built two-story mansions in town that expressed their wealth. St. Luke's Episcopal Church was built in 1854, designed by the nationally known architect, Richard Upjohn.

When Cahaba was connected to a railroad line in 1859, a building boom was stimulated. In 1860, before the American Civil War, the census listed 2,000 residents in the town. About 64% were African Americans, while the population of Dallas County was 75% black and composed largely of enslaved fieldworkers on cotton plantations. In the town, free people of color dominated the poultry business.

=== Civil War ===
During the Civil War, the Confederate government seized Cahaba's railroad and appropriated the iron rails to extend a nearby railroad of more military importance. It built a stockade around a large cotton warehouse on the riverbank along Arch Street in order to use it as a prison, known as Castle Morgan. It was used for Union prisoners-of-war from 1863 to 1865.

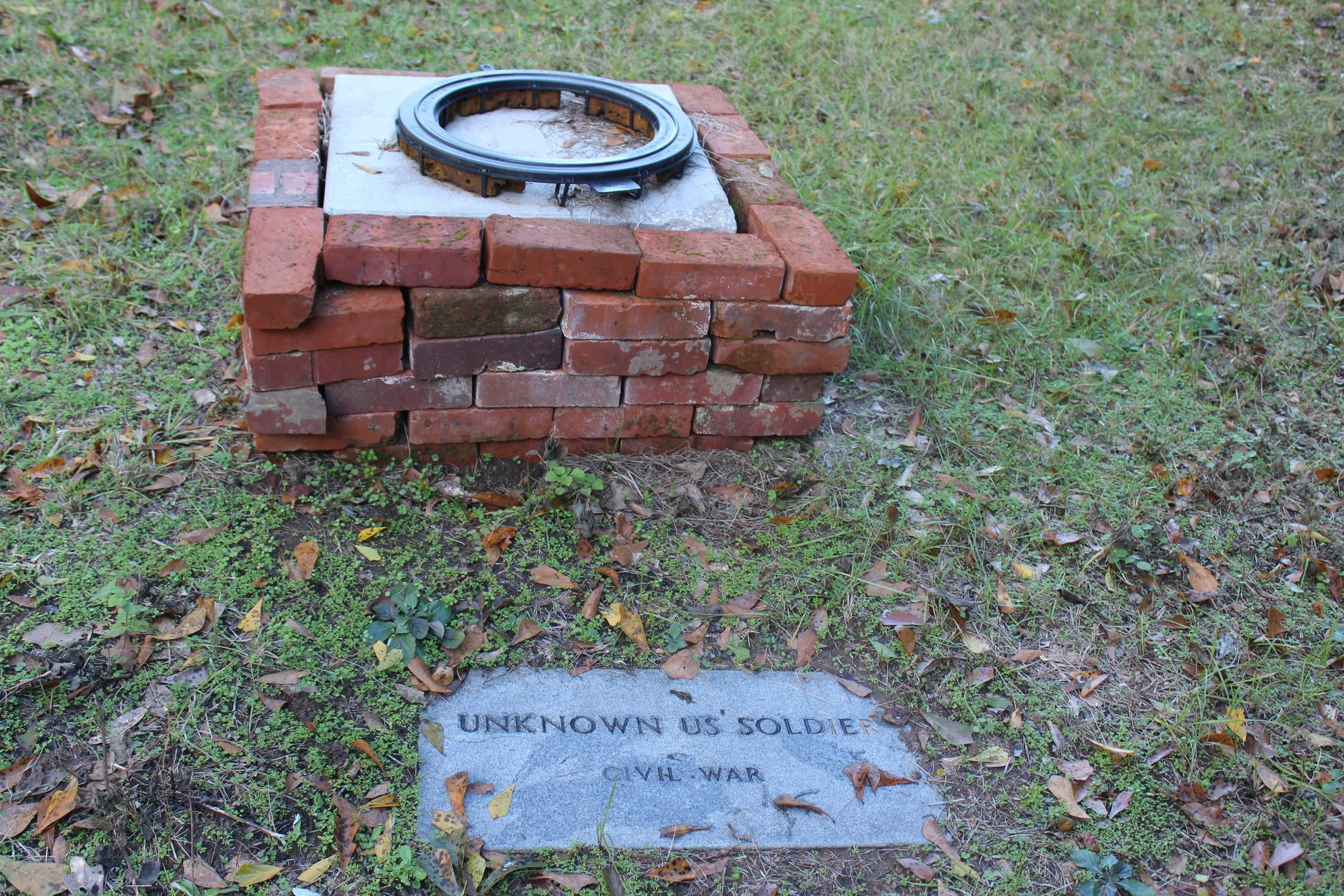
Grave of an unknown soldier buried in Cahaba

In February 1865 a major flood inundated the town, causing much additional hardship for the roughly 3000 Union soldiers held in the prison, and for the town's residents. Confederate General Nathan Bedford Forrest and Union General James H. Wilson met in Cahaba at the Crocheron mansion to discuss an exchange of prisoners captured during the Battle of Selma.

=== Postbellum ===
In 1866, the state legislature moved the county seat to nearby Selma. Related businesses and population soon followed. Within ten years, many of the houses and churches in Cahaba were dismantled and moved away. St. Luke's Episcopal Church, for example, was moved in 1878 to Martin's Station.

Jeremiah Haralson represented Cahawba and Dallas County when elected to the State House, the State Senate and the United States Congress. He was the only African American in Alabama elected to all three legislative bodies during Reconstruction.

Together with the minority of whites, most freedmen rapidly left the declining town. By 1870, the overall population was 431, and the number of blacks was 302. During the Reconstruction era, freedmen organizing in the Republican Party and trying to keep their "moderate political gains" met regularly at the vacant county courthouse. Freedmen and their families gradually developed vacant town blocks into fields and garden plots. But they soon moved away.

Prior to the turn of the 20th century, a freedman purchased most of the old town site for $500. He had the abandoned buildings demolished for their building materials and shipped the material by steamboat to Mobile and Selma for use in growing communities. By 1903, most of Cahawba's buildings were gone; only a handful of structures survived past 1930.

=== Modern ===
Although the area is no longer inhabited, the Alabama Historical Commission maintains the site as Old Cahawba Archeological Park. It was added to the National Register of Historic Places in 1973. Visitors to this park can see many of the abandoned streets, cemeteries, and ruins of this former state capital and county seat. The Cahawba Advisory Committee is a non-profit group based in Selma that serves to support the park; it also maintains a website related to the park and its history. It is conducting fundraising to support the restoration of St. Luke's Episcopal Church, which was relocated to Old Cahawba in the early 21st century.

== Folklore ==
The town, and later its abandoned site, was the setting for many ghost stories during the 19th and 20th centuries. A widely known one tells of a ghostly orb in a now-vanished garden maze at the home of C. C. Pegues. The house was located on a lot that occupied a block between Pine and Chestnut streets. The purported haunting was recorded in “Specter in the Maze at Cahaba” in 13 Alabama Ghosts and Jeffrey.

== Notable people ==
- George Henry Craig, born in Cahaba, former U.S. Representative
- Anderson Crenshaw, former Alabama judge who served in the circuit and state court when this was the state capital
- Jeremiah Haralson, born in Dallas County, he was the only African American in the state elected to the State House, State Senate, and Congress during the Reconstruction era. Was deprived of re-election in 1876 by fraud by the Dallas County Sheriff General Charles M. Shelley.
- Edward Martineau Perine, merchant and planter; owner of the Perine Store and the Perine Mansion on Vine Street

== Gallery ==
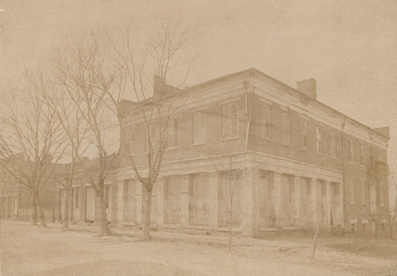
The Perine Store; photo likely taken in the last quarter of the 19th century.

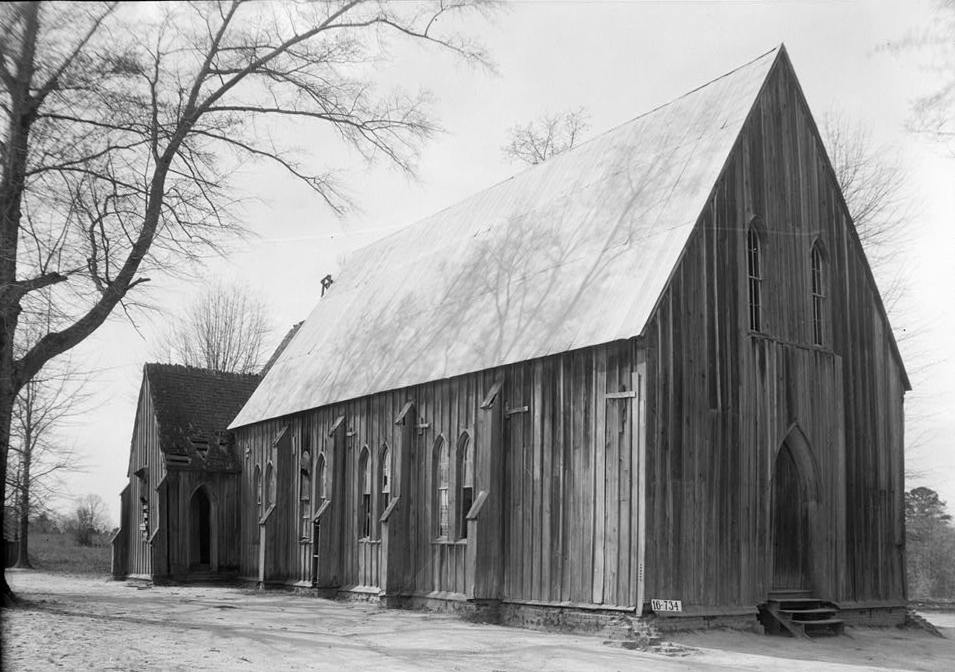
St. Luke's Episcopal Church at Martin's Station (approximately 15 miles (24 km) from Cahaba) in 1934.

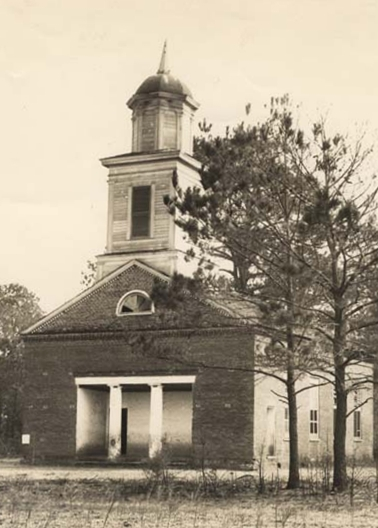
The Methodist Church in the 1930s, later destroyed by fire.

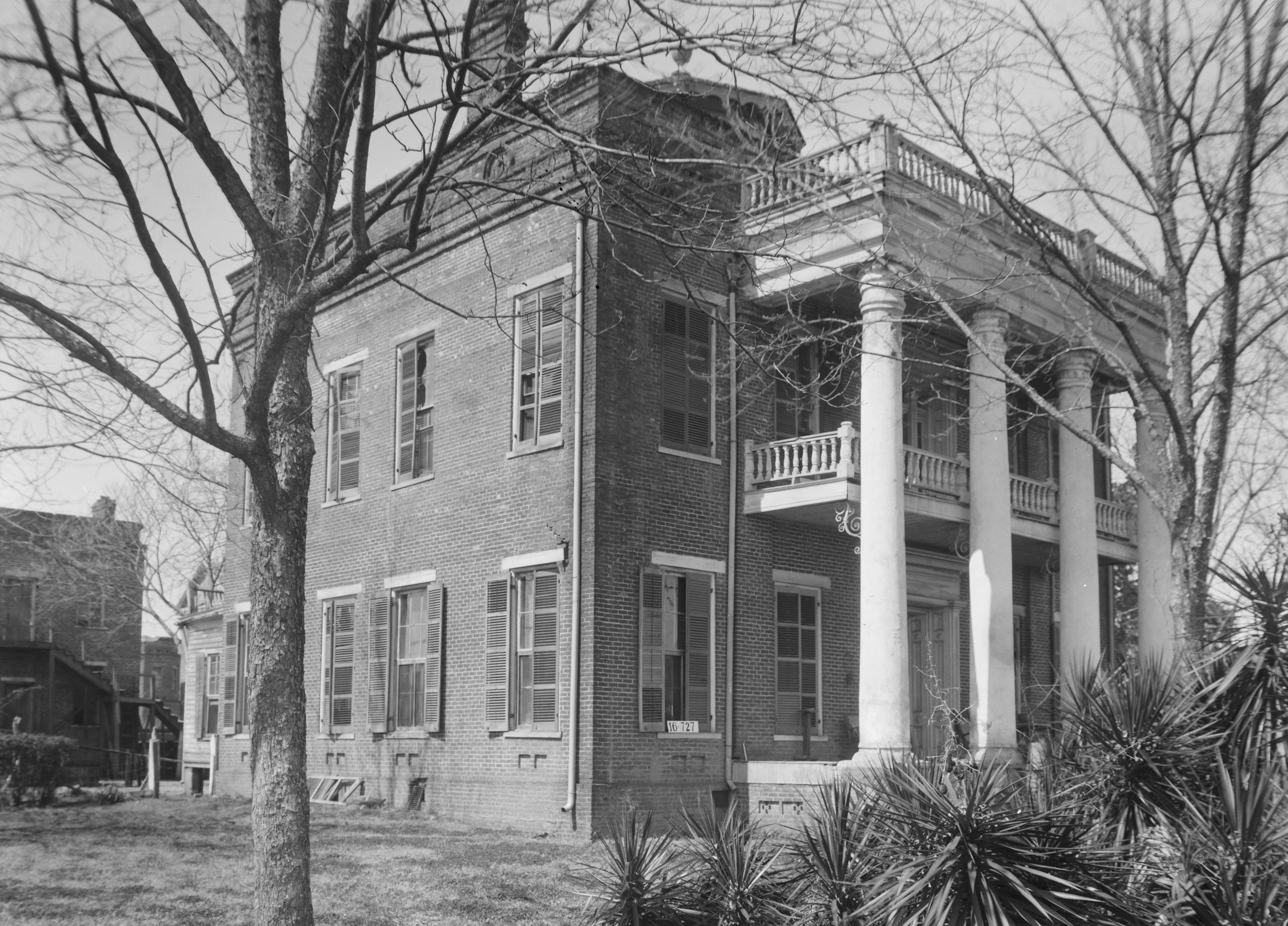
Kirkpatrick mansion on Oak Street, burned in 1935. The two-story brick slave quarters at the rear remains intact.

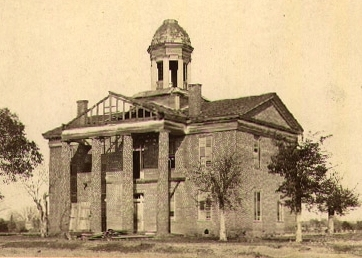
The Female Academy in 1903.

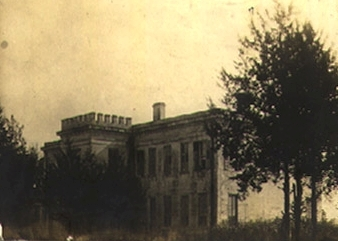
The twenty-six room Perine mansion, built in the 1850s, later demolished.

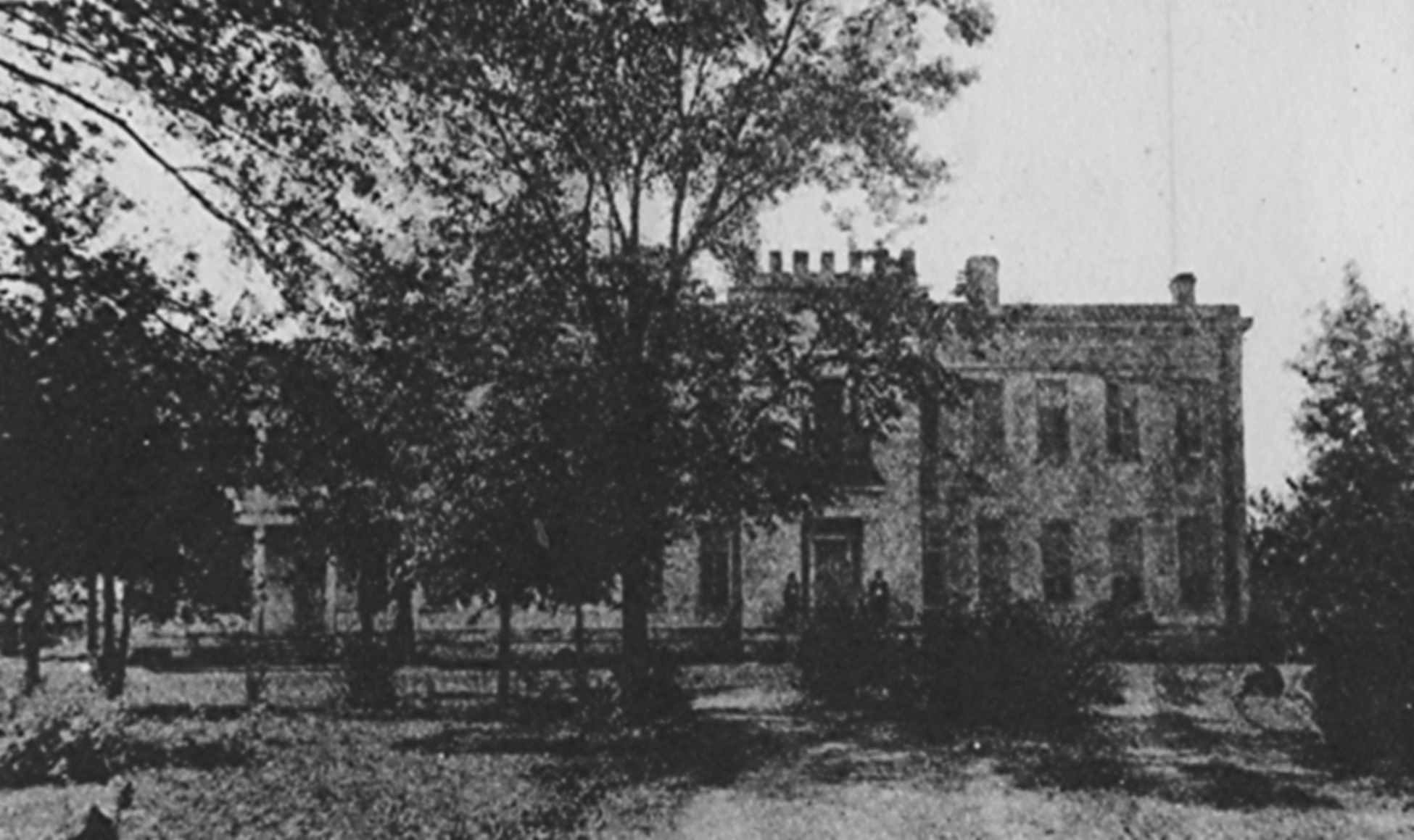
Another view of the Perine Mansion.

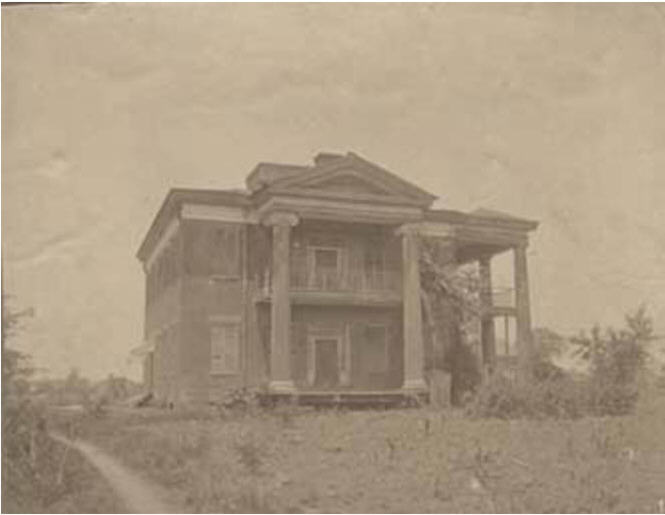
Crocheron mansion, built 1843, destroyed by fire in the early 20th century.

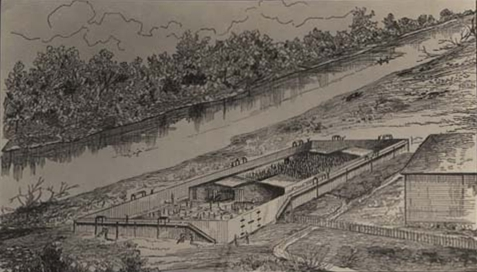
Castle Morgan, a Confederate prison camp on the Alabama River at Cahaba.

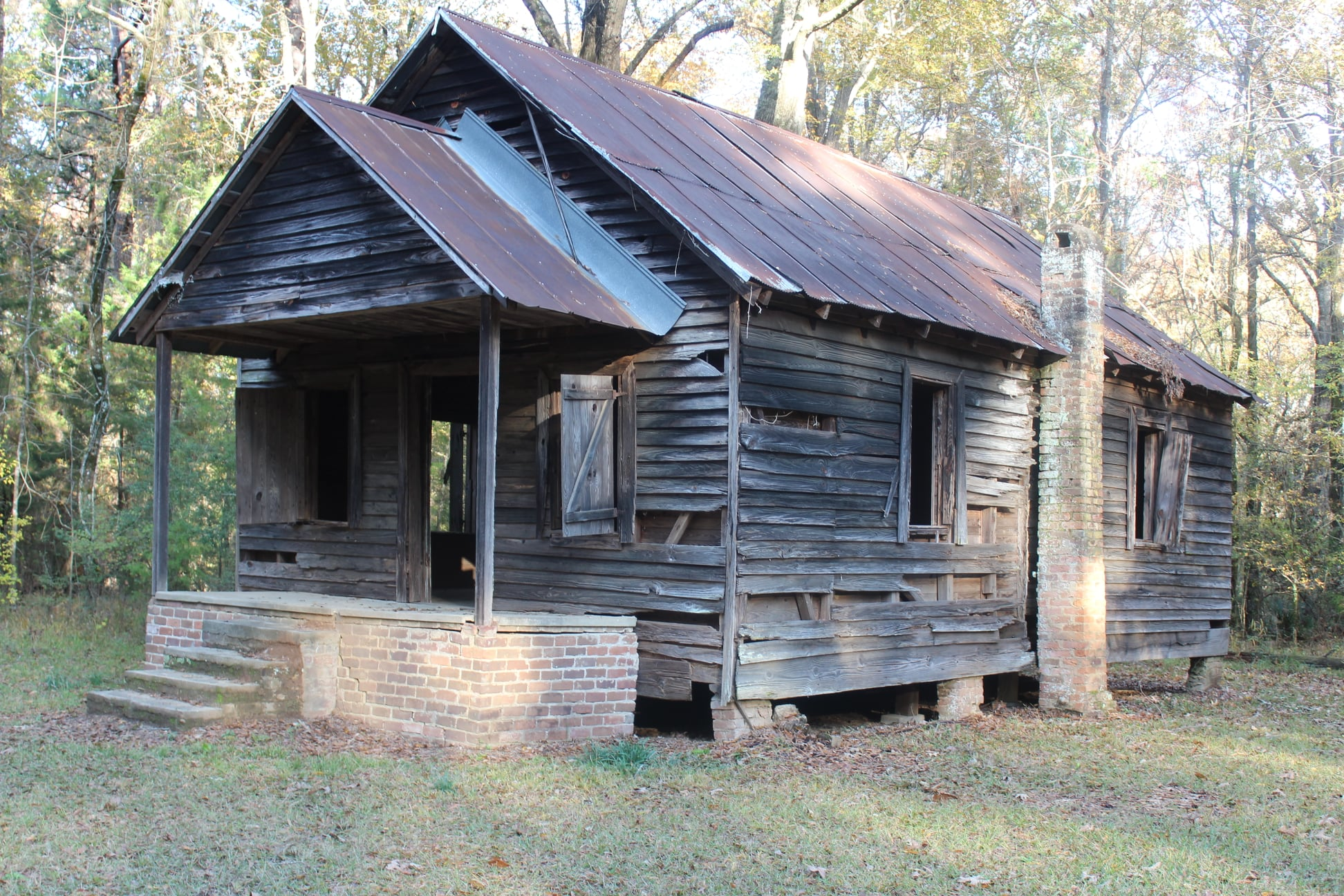
The abandoned school house in Cahaba, taken in November 2019.

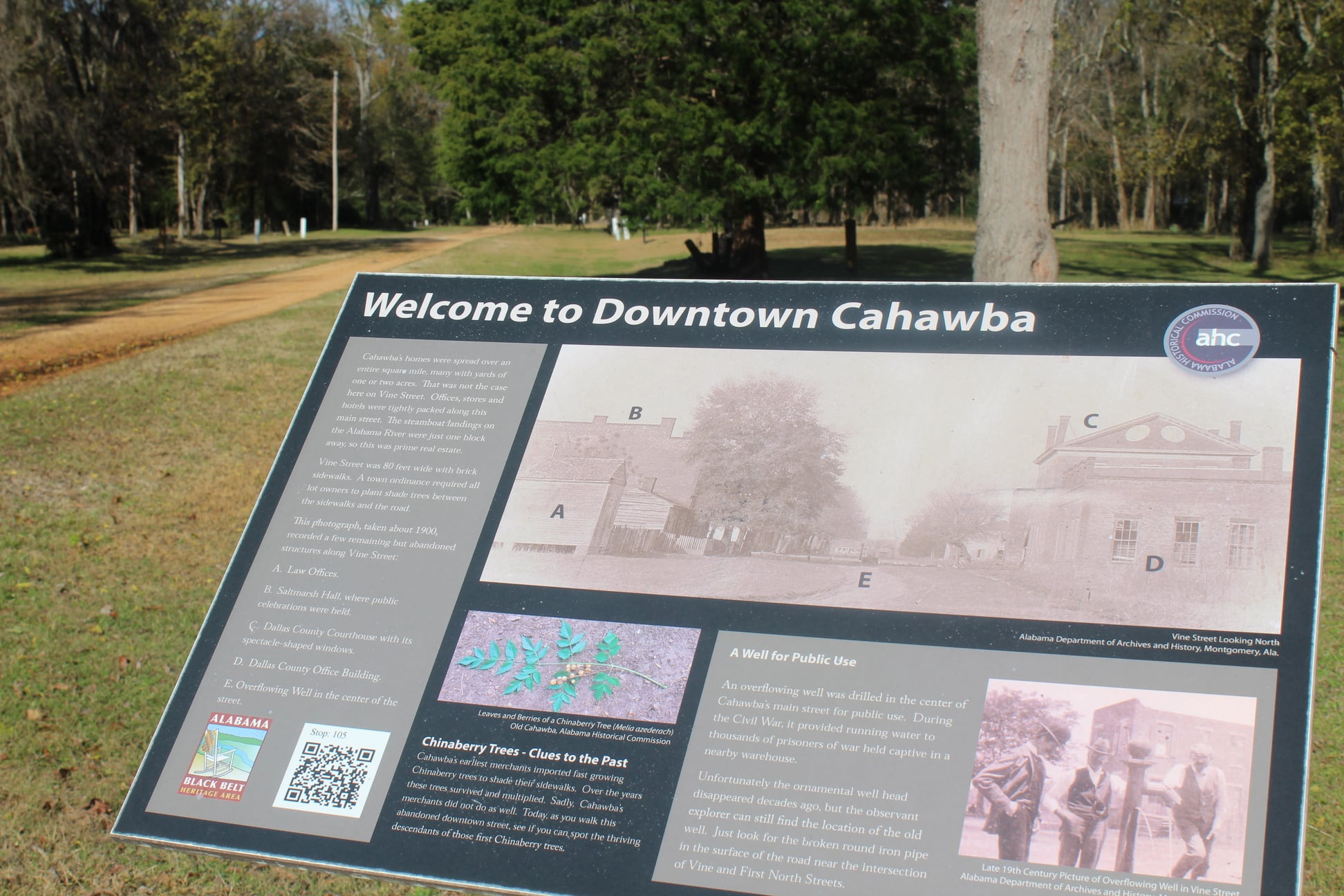
The informational plaque for downtown Cahaba

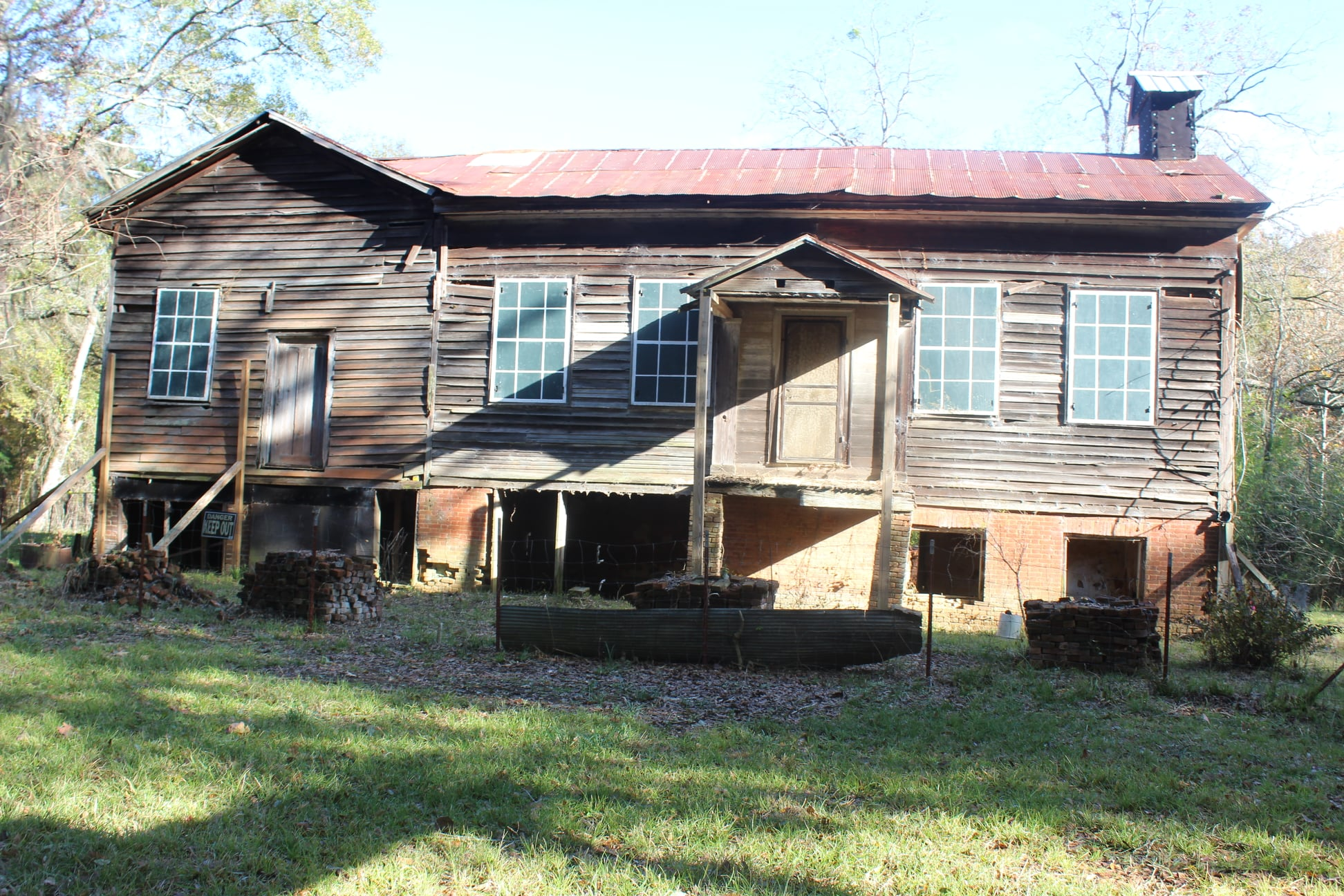
The Arthur/Fambro House, built by Judge W. W. Fambro and purchased by former slave D. Ezekiel Arthur in 1894. Arthur's family lived in the home until 1994.

== See also ==
- List of ghost towns in Alabama
- Reportedly haunted locations in Alabama

== Bibliography ==
- Fry, Anna M. Gayle. ', Memories of Old Cahaba. Nashville, Tenn: Publishing House of the Methodist Episcopal Church, South, 1908.
- Meador, Daniel J., "Riding Over the Past? Cahaba, 1936", Virginia Quarterly Review, Winter 2002.
