= Cerros =

Archaeological site in Belize

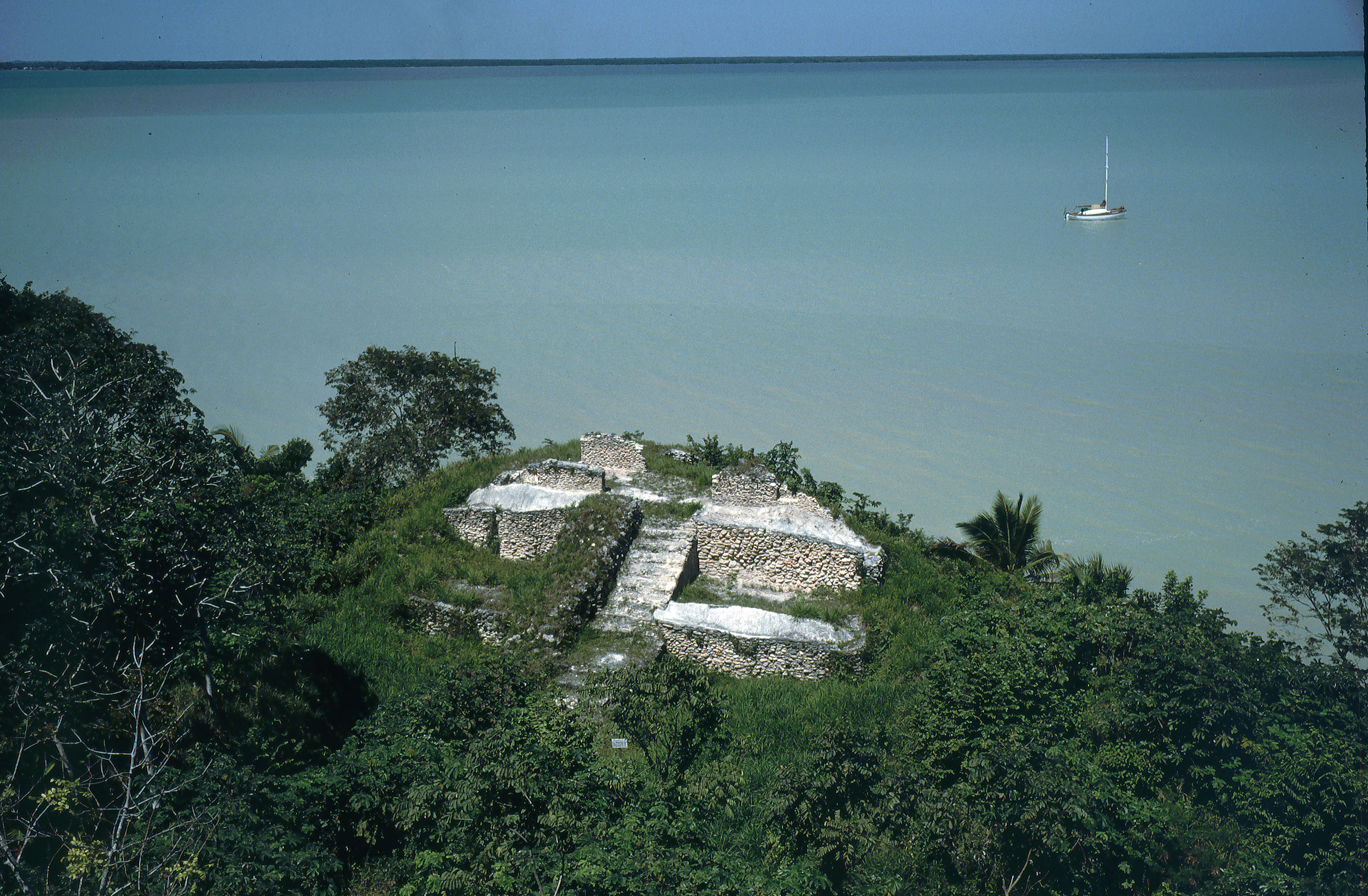
- Ruins of Cerros

- Location of the site Cerros (Belize)
- 18°21′30″N 88°21′07″W
- Periods: Late Preclassic to Postclassic
- Cultures: Maya civilization
- Location: Corozal District, Belize

Site notes
- Condition: In ruins

Cerros is an Eastern Lowland Maya archaeological site in northern Belize that functioned from the Late Preclassic to the Postclassic period. The site reached its apogee during the Mesoamerican Late Preclassic and at its peak, it held a population of approximately 1,089 people. The site is strategically located on a peninsula at the mouth of the New River where it empties into Chetumal Bay on the Caribbean coast. As such, the site had access to and served as an intermediary link between the coastal trade route that circumnavigated the Yucatán Peninsula and inland communities. The inhabitants of Cerros constructed an extensive canal system and utilized raised-field agriculture.

== Site organization ==
The core of the site immediately abuts the bay and consists of several relatively large structures and stepped pyramids, an acropolis complex, and two ballcourts. Bounding the southern side of the site is a crescent-shaped canal network that encloses the central portion of the site and encloses several raised-fields. Residential structures continue outside of the canal, generally radiating southwest and southeast; raised-fields are also present outside of the canal system.

== History ==
From the time of its inception in the Late Preclassic Era, around 400BC, the site of Cerros was a small village of farmers, fishermen and traders. They made use of its fertile soils and easy access to the sea, while producing and trading product amongst the other Maya in the area. Around 50 BC, as their economy grew and they began to experiment with the idea of kingship, the inhabitants of Cerros initiated a great urban renewal program, burying their homes to make way for a group of temples and plazas.

The first of the new constructions was the Structure 5C-2nd, which has become the most famous piece of architecture at the site. Aligned with its back at the edge of Chetumal Bay, it marked the northernmost point of the sacred north–south axis of the site, which was complemented by a ballcourt (Str. 50) which lies at the southernmost point. As kings died, others came along and new temples were constructed in their honor. The last of the substantial constructions at the site (Str. 3A-1st) occurred around AD 100, and many of the other structures appear to have been abandoned before then. During the Protoclassic, Cerros ceased to function as a locus of elitist activity but continued as a location for mundane domestic activity. From then on, any new construction was probably limited to the outer residential area, as the population began to decline severely.

Apart from a small occupation at the end of the Late Classic period as a village community, Cerros has been abandoned since AD 400. This once glorious site was left for ruin and remained virtually unnoticed until Thomas Gann made reference to "lookout" mounds along the coast in 1900, drawing interest to the site.

== Archaeology structure of Cerros ==
Archaeological work at Cerros first began around 1973 when the site was purchased by the Metroplex Corporation of Dallas, who intended to build a tourist resort around the ancient Maya ceremonial center, and to eventually donate the archaeological site to the government of Belize to create a national park.

They contacted Ira R. Abrams, who was teaching in Dallas in the Anthropology Department of Southern Methodist University (SMU), and had extensive experience working with the Maya in that part of what was then the colony of British Honduras (it was renamed Belize in June 1973 and became an independent country in 1981). Abrams worked with President of Metroplex, John Love, and their employee, John Favro, and local arts patron, Stanley Marcus, to create the Cerro Maya Foundation to fund excavations and the partial restoration of the site.

To accomplish this, Abrams became director of the Cerro Maya Project and member of the board of the Cerro Maya Foundation, and hired archaeologist David Freidel to supervise the excavations. Abrams also made initial arrangements with Joseph Palacio, the Archaeology Commissioner of British Honduras, for a permit to excavate the site, and hired workers from the nearby Xaibe village to work at the site. When plans for the proposed resort later fell through, the site was turned over to the government of Belize as promised.

In 1974 Freidel and his team uncovered evidence which suggested that the site was of the Late Preclassic period. In 1975, when a dedicatory offering cache was uncovered at Structure 6, further evidence was provided that Cerros was indeed a Late Preclassic site. Throughout the 1970s, research was allowed to continue, funded by the National Science Foundation. The original team completed their excavations in 1981.

In the 1990s, Debra Walker and a team of archaeologists began a series of new excavations to investigate the site's demise at the end of the Late Preclassic Era. In addition to the research done at the site, Walker's team also did radiocarbon dating on newly found artifacts. They also recalibrated several dates from the original research, in order to establish a tighter chronological sequence.

== Architecture ==
=== Monumental architecture ===
==== Structure 5C-2nd ====
The northernmost structural complex, located at the edge of Chetumal Bay, is referred to as Structure 5C-2nd, which contains a modest size temple. Estimated to have been built around 50BC, the two-tiered south facing platform pyramid had wall stubs atop it for what would have been a perishable superstructure. Having the entire settlement facing the south allowed the whole community the ability to witness rituals on its staircase. In Maya cosmology, north is associated with the direction of the sky, where the celestial gods hold domain, while the south is the direction of the underworld. This placement associated the primary temple both physically and symbolically with the celestial domain.

Of importance are four huge painted plaster mask reliefs placed against the platform's stepped walls which flank either side of the stairway depicting the forces of the cosmos. Linda Schele and David Freidel have identified the two lower masks as representations of The Hero Twins of the Popol Vuh.

The four masks have been interpreted as follows:

- The main mask on the lower right panel is a depiction of the rising sun and of Xbalanque, who is identified by a "k'in"(sun) glyph on his cheeks. He is flanked by his objects including his helmet, chin-strip and earflares. He is also identified by a glyph within the decoration surrounding his left ear flare as "yax"(first). In addition:
- The lower mask on the left is Xbalanque as well, but in the position of the setting sun, balancing the depiction of the rising sun
- The upper mask on the right is a depiction of Hunahpu, aka Venus or the Morningstar
- The upper mask on the left is Hunahpu as well, but in the position of the Eveningstar

Their positions are meant to represent the path that the Sun and Venus follow throughout the sky. In 2005, in his piece The Creation Mountains: Structure 5C-2nd and Late Preclassic Kingship, David Freidel offers yet another interpretation of the masks. He now feels that the lower panels represent the bundled bones and funerary masks of the Maize God and his twin brother. Also in this new interpretation, the upper masks are meant to represent the gods Itzamnaaj, the God of Creation and Chaak, the God of Human Sacrifice. Together, they killed and destroyed the Maize God. It was these gods that the king impersonated when he would perform atop the structure.

The structure also contains four large postholes, which once were used for the placing of sacred trees, which were called world trees. The king utilized the rear area of the temple to perform private ceremonies such as fasting, bloodletting and genital perforation.

==== Structure 6 ====
The second temple known as Structure 6 is larger and located in front of Structure 5C-2nd on the west side of the north–south axis. Like Structure 5C-2nd, Structure 6 faces south however while the first temple stood alone, the second temple forms part of a triadic pattern followed by its successors at Cerros. This triadic pattern was elevated on a large platform and consisted of a main temple, flanked by two smaller buildings. Construction of this structure began somewhere around 50BC and all additional modifications were completed somewhere between 50 and 60 years later. At 16 meters above the level of the surrounding surface, its height allowed the king more privacy to hold ceremonies, which could only be viewed by a select few. Schele and Freidel postulate that the existence of such a pyramid, with its differentiated viewing spaces, indicates a high degree of social stratification among the people of Cerros. This triadic plan was a hallmark at major Preclassic centers and it appears that by emulating this architectural plan, the rulers of Cerros had embraced a further means of reinforcing a basic cosmological principle underlying their power.

This temple was probably constructed upon the accession of a new king. This theory is supported by the excavation of a burial cache beneath the structure 6B, which held objects believed to have belonged to the former ruler, including his Jester God diadem.

==== Structure 4 ====
Taking its present form somewhere around AD 1, Structure 4 was built by the same ruler as Structure 6 and was located opposite the second temple on the east side of the newly established east–west axis at Cerros. This temple was to become the largest at Cerros. The change of orientation with this new temple, facing east, signaled an additional association between temple and ruler, the reborn rising sun. This structure was also meant to be the king's funerary shrine, however it was never used for reasons unknown as the chamber was empty upon excavation.

==== Structure 29C ====
This great temple marks another change as it faces westward and was built to the south of the original north precinct. It is a triadic structure with three separate temple platforms on top of a greater pyramid and considered one of the clearest expressions of the Preclassic triadic plan at Cerros. The small, central platform, which faces west, is adorned with carvings of jaguar heads. The sides of the two remaining temples display long-snouted masks. According to Schele and Freidel, Structure 29C was probably meant to be a war monument and was clearly associated with the north (Str. 61) and south (Str. 50) ballcourts.

==== Structure 3A ====
Erected around AD 100, this structure is considered to be the final temple at the site of Cerros, and is probably the last of the substantial constructions. This structure was built directly south of Structure 4, returning to the original sacred north–south axis and earlier south-facing orientation. This temple was carelessly constructed and did not contain a burial cache signaling a decline in power of the rulers at Cerros. Structure 3A was most likely commissioned by the last of the rulers at Cerros during the Late Preclassic period.

=== Ballcourts ===
==== Structure 61 ====
Structure 61 is considered to be an open ended ballcourt with a raised alley flanked by two parallel buildings (Structure 61B, which faces the west and Structure 61C, which faces east). Both buildings have broad, low, inclined benches which overlook the raised playing field and rest upon a low substructure (Str. 61A). Unlike most ballcourts, there is no upper playing wall on either building, so it is likely that the bench area was considered to be within fair play. The sloped vertical faces of the benches functioned to encourage the ball to bounce upwards off of them.

==== Structure 50 ====
The Structure 50 ballcourt is considered to be identical to Structure 61 with a few exceptions:

- The playing area of Structure 50 is in a sunken court of rectangular form, which has defined playing areas, as opposed to the open ended design of Structure 61
- Both side buildings, Structures 50C and 50E, have upper summit platforms that were probably included in the field of play
- Structures 50A and 50B are two large end-zone buildings that are most likely well outside the field of play and probably served as stands for viewing the game

=== Residential structures ===
By 1991, various areas and mounds throughout the site had been excavated; however, there were still many more that had not. The number of excavated residential areas inside the core was 18 and the number of mounds, 20. The number of excavations outside of the core area were fewer, with only 6 areas and 12 mounds. There were a total of 157 presumed areas and mounds inside and outside the core that were left untouched.

== Subsistence at Cerros ==
=== Agriculture and wild plant utilization ===
Cerros has evidence of investments in water management which included the encircling canal where the Maya made use of several raised and channeled fields around the site. It is thought that these canals were used to store water and irrigate nearby field systems during the dry season. One such field lies west of the Structure 50 ballcourt and was located just inside the boundary of the main canal, which surrounded the community. Inhabitants made use of the main canal, which was constructed during the C'oh Phase (200-50 BC) for crop irrigation year round. During the dry season, the canal and its branches were most likely ponded and used for pot irrigation. During the wet season, they were used along with drainage ditches to irrigate the crops. It is unclear whether the motivation behind construction and use of the canals was due to communal enterprise, by elite-directed labor, or both. The "typical triad" of crops (maize, beans and squash) was grown at the site. According to Crane, maize cupules and/or kernels were present in approximately 75% of the samples that were taken at the site. A small number of remains of beans and squash pollen were also found.

Arboriculture was another important part of the Maya diet. Nance tree (Byrsonima crassifolia) seeds were found in about 40% of the samples taken. Cocoyol palm (Acrocomia mexicana) fruit seeds, Ziricote (Cordia dodecandra) and Huano (Sabal spp.) seeds were common as well.

=== Faunal remains ===
A substantial amount of faunal remains have been recovered throughout the site, including various types of marine life, amphibians, reptiles, birds and mammals (both wild and domesticated). The location of the bones of these animals points to the social stratification that was present among the inhabitants of the site. In the areas attributed as residential places for commoners, faunal remains were few, and were almost uniformly of smaller animals. Conversely, the quantity and size of animal remains, in areas attributed to the elite, varied widely. Meats were more accessible to the elites of Cerros.

Various forms of animal procurement took place in and around the site. Marine faunal procurement was most likely the primary focus and took place in a variety of habitats. Dogs were bred for meat and were probably eaten during the winter "nortes," and during the months in which a great amount of agricultural work was done. Deer and other animals, such as peccary, pumas, jaguars and smaller mammals were hunted as well.

== Trade ==
During the Late Preclassic long-distance trade contacts with volcanic areas were in existence as evidenced by the recovery of numerous pieces of jade and crystalline hematite and also visible in the monumental art of Cerros. For raw materials readily available in northern Belize, Cerros may have functioned as a redistribution conjuncture as well as a transshipment point for products to be shipped inland by way of the New River. With the cease of construction at Cerros and no new structures of any consequence dating to the Classic Period there, the population began to decline dramatically and no jade or crystalline hematite artifacts have been recovered from any of the Classic Period deposits uncovered at Cerros.

== Burials and caches ==
A 1979 excavation of burial groups throughout the site uncovered 26 individuals in 20 interments. The archaeologists found that both sexes were represented and that the age of the individuals ranged from infancy to mature adulthood. Also included in these burials were pottery vessels, metate fragments and chert tools.

A variety of artifacts were found within caches throughout the site. Structure 6B contained a dedicatory cache with a large number of offerings, including 28 jade artifacts, a few ceramic vessels, spondylus shells, mirror fragments made from specular hematite and a variety of white shell disks. Assorted smashed termination offerings were also found at Structures 2A and 5C-2nd.

== Present-day conditions ==
Much of the site remains unexcavated. It is now possible to travel to Cerros over a gravel road from Corozal Town. There is an archaeological information officer on site. Access to the collection excavated in the 1970s is available through a digital catalogue compiled by the Florida Museum of Natural History with funding from the National Endowment for the Humanities.
