= El Perú (Maya site) =

Pre-Columbian Maya archaeological site in Guatemala

Coordinates: 17.2783°N 90.3806°W

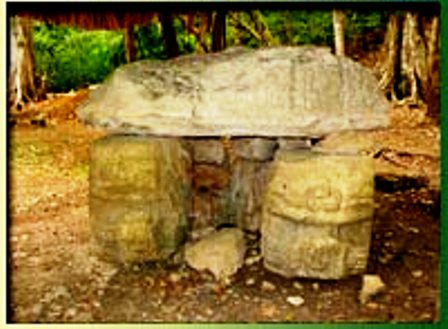
Carved altar from El Perú (Waka') in Guatemala

El Perú (also known as Waka'), is a pre-Columbian Maya archaeological site occupied during the Preclassic and Classic cultural chronology periods (roughly 500 BC to 800 AD). The site was the capital of a Maya city-state and is located near the banks of the San Pedro River in the Petén Department of northern Guatemala. El Perú is 60 km (37 mi) west of Tikal.

== Research ==
The Maya city of Waka' was rediscovered by oil prospectors in the 1960s. In the 1970s Ian Graham, a Harvard researcher, documented monuments at the site. Then in 2003 David Freidel, of Southern Methodist University, and Héctor Escobedo, of the University of San Carlos, began to excavate Waka'.

== Etymology ==
The site was named "El Perú" when rediscovered in the twentieth century. Maya glyphs identified and deciphered at the site have indicated that the ancient name for the site was Waka'. While both names are currently used interchangeably, El Perú predominates on extant maps. In the published literature, a conflated name is generally used, El Perú-Waka'.

== History ==
The first recorded meeting between Teotihuacan and the Maya occurred at Waka' in 378, 10 days prior to their arrival at Tikal. This moment is known among Mesoamerican archaeologists as “La Entrada.” During the early phases of the Early Classic, Waka’ was allied with Tikal.

Waka’, however, later betrayed Tikal and forged a political alliance with Calakmul. This alliance was solidified by K'inich Balam (“Sun Faced Jaguar”), who ruled from the late 7th century to the early 8th century and was married to Lady T'abi, a princess from Calakmul, capital of the Kan dynasty at the time. This union was a political maneuver that linked El Peru (K’inich Balam) to Calakmul and its leader Yuknom Cheen in a military alliance. Lady T’abi was later given the title ix kaloomté ("empress" or "warlord”), a high title used in ancient Maya texts. Yuknom Cheen was attempting to gather several Maya kingdoms into a larger polity.

Waka's downfall was likely initiated by its alliance with Calakmul. Following Tikal's re-emergence from its hiatus in the Late Classic, Calakmul fell to its military might. Calakmul's ruler Yuknoom Took' K'awiil, likely the brother of Lady T'abi, was defeated, captured, and sacrificed in Tikal's central plaza in 732. Tikal's ruler Yik'in Chan K'awiil defeated Waka' in 743. Waka’ was converted into a vassal state of Tikal. After this victory Yik'in Chan K'awiil took an image of a celestial serpent from Waka' and brought it to Tikal. According to Robert Sharer, the celestial serpent was possibly Waka's patron deity. Evidence for Yik'in Chan K'awiil's act can be found on Tikal's Temple IV. Not a year later he defeated Naranjo. Waka' was eventually destroyed a decade later, an event that included the capture and sacrifice of K'inich Balam's successor.

== Trading Power ==
As a trading power, Waka' held proximity to the San Pedro River which flowed westward from the Petén. Waka also had access to a north–south overland route. This route connected south Campeche and the Petén. The close location to the dominant Maya capitals Calakmul and Tikal contributed to the trading power of Waka'. Waka's market included maize, beans, chili peppers, avocados, chicle, and latex. Waka', also, obtained jade and quetzal feathers, used for costumes.

== Population and Layout ==
Around 400, Waka' had a population containing tens of thousands people. According to Chris Hardman in "Woman Power in the Maya World", this was the political peak of the city. The reason for the high population was the ideal location and trading power of the city.

The city included hundreds of buildings, four plazas, and ceremonial centers. Archaeologists have divided El Perú into different groups and plazas. Plaza 1 is in the center of the site. Other plazas, built neighboring Plaza 1, include residence compounds. The Northwest group is located near Plaza 1 and a ballcourt. The Paal group can be found near Plaza 2 and south of Plaza 1. South east of Plaza 1 are the Chok and Tolok groups. Just below these groups is the Mirador Complex.

== Recent discoveries ==
A number of tombs have recently been discovered at Waka' that contribute to the understanding of past Maya culture. One that is particularly important is the “Queen’s Tomb.” This feature contains the remains of a female in a tomb containing a rich assortment of grave goods. Of particular importance is the presence of a bloodletting paraphernalia in the form of a ceremonial stingray spine. This object was in clear association with the individual's genital region, and indicates that royal women practiced genitalia bloodletting rituals.

An additional tomb for an elite individual was recently found within an 18-meter-tall (59 ft) pyramid located in the site's central core. The tomb's chamber, which is 5.1 meters long by 1.5 meters wide, contained a rich assemblage of grave goods, including jade offerings, shell artifacts, ceramic vessels, 12 ballgame player figurines, the paws of jaguar, and stones from the Eastern Highlands and the Pacific Lowlands, which were used as signs of wealth. The early date of the tomb, between c. 200 and 400, indicates Waka's early regional importance in the southern Maya lowlands.

Recent research at the site of Zapote Bobal suggests a strong connection between that site and El Perú. It is possible that El Perú may have had a strong influence on the dynasty centered at Zapote Bobal.

=== Emblem Glyph ===
==== Early Classic ====
The Early Classic period emblem glyph of El Perú consists of an Ajaw glyph connected to a zoomorphic head. According to Stanley Paul Guenter, this is similar to the Chapa(h)t logogram. Guenter also believes the zoomorphic head represents a centipede or creature with a face like a centipede's. The main sign of this glyph says Wak. Guenter says this could be a word used for centipede however there is little evidence for this in previous knowledge of Mayan.

==== Late Classic ====
The Late classic shows a transition from iconographic logogram usage for the emblem glyph to use of syllables to spell out the name.

The "Snake Head Emblem" was originally thought to represent El Perú. This idea came from a pair of looted stelae Ian Graham said came from the site. Scholars David Stuart, Stephen Houston, and others have found a different emblem glyph they believe provides a better representation of El Perú during the Late Classic.

Simon Martin was the first to study this glyph in 2000. The emblem includes two hieroglyphs. The first glyph contains three different signs. The K'uh sign is a prefix for the glyph and according to Stanley Paul Guenter of Southern Methodist University the sign is used to represent something "divine." A male head with a spot on his cheek makes up the second part of the hieroglyph. Guenter says this is most likely a representation of the maize god. Above the head's ear is a K'in sign. On top of the male head is a sign David Stuart, and Stephen Houston read as Nal. Guenter says the sign requires further study before it can be legitimately read as Nal.

The second hieroglyph also contains three signs. The glyph includes an Ajaw, a leadership title, superfix. Below this sign is the syllable ka. The syllable wa makes the third sign. Simon Martin says this glyph should be read as Wak Ajaw. He has identified Waka' as the ancient toponym for El Perú. In Stanley Paul Guenter's article, "Emblem Glyph of El Perú" he says -a' refers to the Maya word used for water. Therefore, Waka' means "Wak-water" or "Wak-place." The possible meanings for wak include the number six or the description of a location on an escarpment. The latter possibility comes from wa' meaning "stood up."

Kings in the Late Classic differed from Early Classic because they attached a second part to the emblem. This second part recognized new rulers and an alliance with Calakmul.

=== Stela 15 ===
Stela 15 is a monument containing only Maya glyphs. Stanley Gunter dates the stela to 416. The monument contains the names of rulers back until the mid 4th century. The monument also describes how a foreign war leader Siyaj K'ahk, or Siyaj K'ak' came to Waka' during January of 378. According to epigrapher David Stuart (Mayanist), this stela supports the idea of Siyaj K'ahk' traveling through Waka' roughly eight days before taking over Tikal's government.

=== Stela 16 ===
Stela 16 was first sketched by Ian Graham in the early 1970s and later in 2004 by David Freidel.

The monument, found a few yards away from Stela 15, shows a man wearing a headdress and royal outfit similar to rulers of Teotihuacan. The man holds a bird-headed staph on his right and a bundle on his left. David Freidel suggests the bird head is a symbol for "Spearthrower Owl." This was one name used for a certain king of Teotihuacan, and the father of Siyaj K'ahk'. Epigrapher Stanley Guenter deciphered part of the Maya script on Stela 16 and believes it says "planted [his] banner stone, Siyaj K'ahk". Freidel thinks this monument is a depiction of the war leader many years after he had traveled through Waka'.

=== Stela 30 ===
The text of stela 30 describes the contact of El Perú's king Mah-Kina-Balam and his wife to the king Jaguar-Paw, of Calakmul. The stela says they participated, along with other kings from western kingdoms, in the ritual of accession for Jaguar-Paw. One of these kings may have included Flint-Sky-God K of Dos Pilas, well known for his many captives. The stela describes how Mah-Kina-Balam and his wife were a part of the period-ending rites and displayed the God K scepter to Jaguar-Paw. Stela 30 also gives proof of Jaguar-Paw's visits to El Perú.

=== Stela 34 ===
This stela portrays a woman identified as Lady K'abel who is described as a lady warlord. She was the wife of king K'inich B'ahlam II and daughter of the Calakmul king Yuknoom Yich'aak K'ak'. The stela was found by a looter in the 1960s. It is believed to be dated to 692. Stela 34 would have been situated in one of the plazas.

=== Lady K'abel's Tomb ===
In 2004 tomb, dating between 650 and 750, was discovered by José Ambrosio Díaz. This tomb holds the remains of a high status woman. The tomb was identified as a royal tomb due to the amount of jade. Archaeologists believe the tomb may belong to Lady K'abel because the items within the tomb are similar to the image of her on Stela 34. The tomb was found in the main courtyard, under a building. Within the tomb were 23 vessels used for offerings, beads, shells, and a huunal jewel. This jewel was often placed on ko'haws, helmets. These helmets were worn by war leaders. This suggests the woman was more powerful than most women of her time. Archaeologists do not believe this helmet necessarily means she was a war leader. It is more likely she was acting as a guardian of items used in battle.

=== Tomb of Two Women ===
In 2005 archaeologists Michelle Rich and Jennifer Piehl found the remains of two, possibly royal, women. The tomb is 4 feet high and 6.5 feet long. The two women were laid on top of each other with their backs touching. The woman on the bottom was pregnant. At the time of their death they were between the ages of 25 and 35. These women are believed to be royal because of their great condition of health and the vessels within their tomb. Rich believes these women were sacrificed by a new ruler who sought to eliminate the current family in power.

=== Burial #39 ===
In 2006, Field Director Michelle Rich and her team discovered a collapsed tomb of a supposed ruler who died in the early 7th century. Burial #39 was located at pyramid O14-04 in the "adosada", also known as the front platform. The tomb was sealed by a stone wall which took the archaeologists five days to remove. The artifacts within this tomb include painted and carved bones, mosaics, jade, mirrors, snake-like figurines, and ceramic figurines. The value of the items within this burial suggest the individual was a king. The king ruled after Muwaan Bahlam and before K'inich Bahlam II.

==== 23 Ceramic Figurines ====
Within Burial #39 a group of 23 figurines were found. In David Freidel's article, "Resurrecting the Maize King", he discusses how these figurines are a depiction of a royal court performing a ceremony. More specifically the figures show a king kneeling with his arms crossed. The king figure's hair is similar to that of the [Maize God]. Freidel therefore names the unknown deceased individual the Maize King. Beside the king is a deer spirit, possibly healing the king. This deer spirit may have been the way, spirit companion, of a different king watching the ceremony.

A figurine of a female singer conjures the deer spirit. Evidence for this includes the pigtail associated with shaman. She is also full of a red paint, thought to be the color of life. She holds sticks under her arm which may have been quill pens or used for counting. Beside the singer is a dwarf wearing a headdress similar to a deer. The dwarf is holding a shell trumpet which may have been used to conjure the deer from the underworld. Above the dwarf is a toad, often symbolic of birth in [ancient Maya] culture. Two other dwarf figurines are wearing helmets and look as if they are about to fight. Freidel suggests they might be boxers. Karl Taube, of the University of California, and Marc Zender, of Harvard University, believe boxing may have been a sport of ancient Meso-America.

Two figures, thought to be the successor of Waka' and his queen, are situated on the left of the deer spirit. The king figure is called Scribe King because his headdress resembles a monkey and the monkey gods were associated with scribes. The headdress contains a green mask inside a red seashell, held by a thumb. Freidel says this represents life rising from the underworld and the resurrection of the dead ruler's soul.

==== Olmec Style Figurine ====
Another notable item found in Burial #39 includes an Olmec-like figurine. The figurine was found north of the buried ruler's head. It was located inside two lip-to-lip cache vessels. The inside of these vessels were coated with a red pigment partially made of cinnabar. According to Michelle Rich, ancient Maya associated cinnabar coated caches, containing offerings, with resurrecting rulers, more specifically the maize god. A trefoil sprout on the crown of the figurine provides further evidence of a connection to the maize god. According to Michelle Rich this is used as a symbol for the maize god.

The figurine has one leg up, possibly showing dance movement. The left arm is bent and the right arm is missing. The top of the figurine's head forms a fin. This represents either a fish or shark. The mouth of the figurine resembles a jaguar's and contains a tooth much like a shark tooth. The crescent shape of the eyes are similar to the Olmec death god’s eyes, connecting the figurine to death. The low eye-lids of the figurine show a cross-bands motif on the right and a U shape on the left. These are often used as symbols of kingship. The figurine also has an engraving of the quatrefoil motif on the back. This suggests the figurine provides a way into the supernatural world.

The figurine is believed to be an heirloom of a dancing boy, representative of resurrection. This figurine was an important discovery because it is evidence that the ancient Maya knew about the Olmec maize god.

=== Tolok Group Deposit ===
A deposit was found near the main residential compound, referred to as N14-2 by excavators, of the Tolok group. This deposit contained the remains of two individuals, a two-year-old in burial #18 and a middle aged male in burial #19. The man was found under the staircase of N14-2 and had tabular modification of his skull. The two individuals had each been placed between two rocks and buried on top of broken ceramics. It is possible the deceased were sacrifices. Along with these individuals were items that suggested to researchers the deposit was used for a ritual feasting event, important for establishing social position. The items included many bowls, plates, vases, bones of animals, ceramic figurines of a jaguar head and monkey wearing a headdress, and musical instruments. Keith Eppich of Southern Methodist University believes the items were intentionally broken in the deposit for the feasting ritual. The location of the deposit gives further indication of a feasting ritual. The ritual occurred at the stairs of N 14-2, a common location for the dedication ritual called Och-Otot which means "enters house." This ritual was an act of paying debt to otherworldly powers and was often used with the construction of new architecture. Eppich says the two individuals were sacrificed and then became the "soul" of the building, N14-2.

=== Maya Warrior Queen ===
In October 2012, the suspected tomb and remains of an important Maya queen were discovered at the site. During excavations led by David Freidel of Washington University in St. Louis uncovered a tomb in the city's main pyramid temple and it was identified as belonging to Lady Ka’bel, the military ruler of the Wak kingdom between AD672 and 692. The body inside was buried with various offerings, including “ceramic vessels, jade jewellery, stone figurines, and a small alabaster jar carved in the shape of a conch shell, out of which the carved head and arms of an old woman emerge”. Maya hieroglyphs on the back of the jar include the names "Lady Water Lily Hand" and "Lady Snake Lord", according to the study team. Both names are thought to refer to Lady K'abel, who governed the Wak kingdom for her family, the empire-building Kan, or "Snake", dynasty, based in the Maya capital Calakmul.

=== El Peru altar ===
An altar has been discovered at El Peru, featuring a quatrefoil on the back of a zoomorphic creature in which sits a ruler.

"While the imagery bears remarkable similarities to that of Izapa Stela 8, the text of the El Peru altar elucidates the significance of the quatrefoil, describing it as tu yol ahk, 'at the heart of the turtle' or 'in the portal of the turtle', a reference to the creation narrative of the Maize god's rebirth".

== El Perú today ==
While open to the public, Waka' is a difficult site to get to. It sits atop an escarpment in the Laguna del Tigre National Park (part of the Maya Biosphere Reserve), six kilometers north of the San Pedro River. The site can be reached via an arduous route from Flores, the closest town with an airport (the Mundo Maya International Airport).

== Bibliography ==
- Breuil, Véronique, Laura Gamez, James L. Fitzsimmons, Jean-Paul Metailie, Edy Barrios, and Edwin Roman (2004) Primeras noticias de Zapote Bobal, una ciudad maya clasica del norocidente de Peten, Guatemala. Mayab 17: 61–83.
- Eppich, Keith (2009). "Feast and Sacrifice at El Perú-Waka': The N14-2 Deposit as Dedication". The PARI Journal 10(2): 1–16.
- Freidel, David (2007). "The Once And Future Maya." Archaeology 60(5): 18–63.
- Freidel, David, Michelle Rich, and F. Kent Reilly III (2010). "Resurrecting the Maize King". Archaeology 63(5):42-45.
- Guenter, Stanley Paul (2007). "On the Emblem Glyph of El Peru". The PARI Journal 7(2):20-23.
- Hardman, Chris (2008). "Woman Power in the Maya World". Americas 60(3): 57–59.
- Rich, Michelle, David Freidel, F. Kent Reilly III and Keith Eppich (2010). "An Olmec-Style Figurine from El Peru-Waka', Peten, Guatemala: A Preliminary Report". Mexicon 17(5) 115–122.
- Schele, Linda; Freidel, David (1990). A Forest of Kings: The Untold Story of the Ancient Maya. New York: William Morrow and Company, INC. pp. 180–181.
- Sharer, Robert J. with Loa P. Traxler (2006). The Ancient Maya. Stanford: Stanford University Press. p. 400. ISBN 0-8047-4817-9.
