= Lady K'abel =

- Ajaw
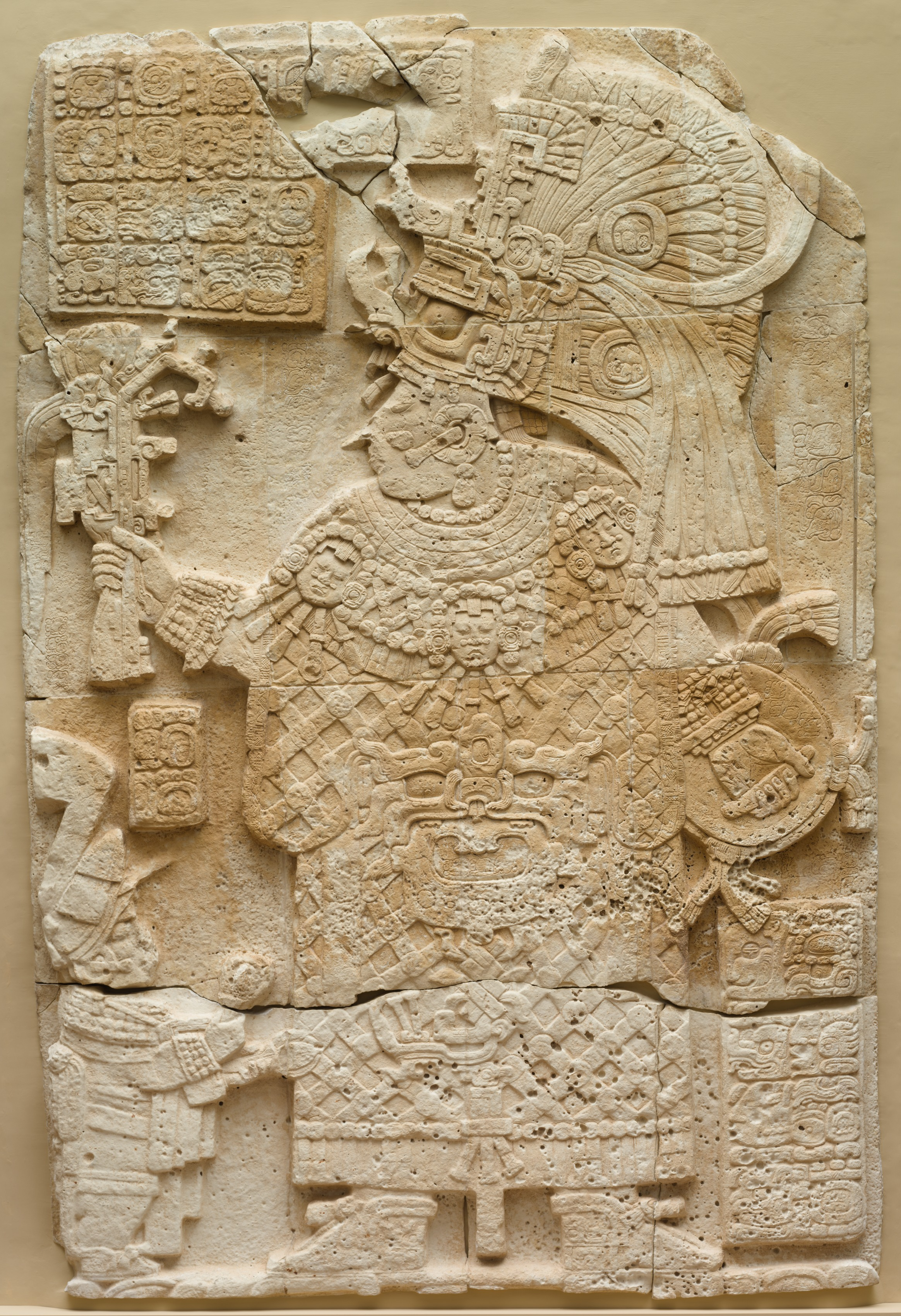
- Lady K'abel's portrait on Stela 34 of El Perú

Queen of El Perú with her husband, K'inich Bahlam II
- Reign: 672-692
- Born: Calakmul
- Died: 702 or 711; El Perú
- Burial: El Perú
- Spouse: K'inich Bahlam II of El Perú
- House: Snake dynasty
- Father: Yuknoom Chʼeen II, King of Calakmul
- Religion: Maya religion

Lady K'abel (7th-century - between 702 and 711) was the queen regnant of the Maya Wak kingdom between 672 and 692 AD. She is also referred to by the names Lady Water Lily Hand and Lady Snake Lord.

== Life ==
She was a member of the powerful Snake dynasty of Calakmul.

She married a man of lower rank named K'inich Bahlam II. Together, they ruled El Perú, a vassal town of Calakmul. She was clearly given higher status and rank than her spouse. Regarding their respective stela, hers is more elaborate—she is depicted in full royal regalia and served by a slave, neither of which was the case for her husband, and she alone had the royal title Ix Kaloomte’ (which may mean something like ‘Lady Supreme Warlord’), a title more common among men and one of the highest royal titles. She is speculated to have led armies against the Maya city of Tikal.

She ruled El Perú between 672 and 692. However, the date for her death is contested and was probably between 702 and 711.

== Burial site ==
In October 2012, the suspected tomb and remains of an important Maya queen were discovered at El Perú. Excavations led by David Freidel of Washington University in St. Louis uncovered a tomb in the city's main pyramid temple and it was identified as belonging to Lady K’abel, the military ruler of the Wak kingdom between 672 and 692 AD. The body inside was buried with various offerings, including "ceramic vessels, jade jewellery, stone figurines, and a small alabaster jar carved in the shape of a conch shell, out of which the carved head and arms of an old woman emerge". Maya hieroglyphs on the back of the jar include the names "Lady Water Lily Hand" and "Lady Snake Lord", according to the study team. Both names are thought to refer to Lady K'abel, who governed the Wak kingdom for her family, the empire-building Kan, or "Snake", dynasty, based in the Maya capital Calakmul.
