= George Edward Perine =

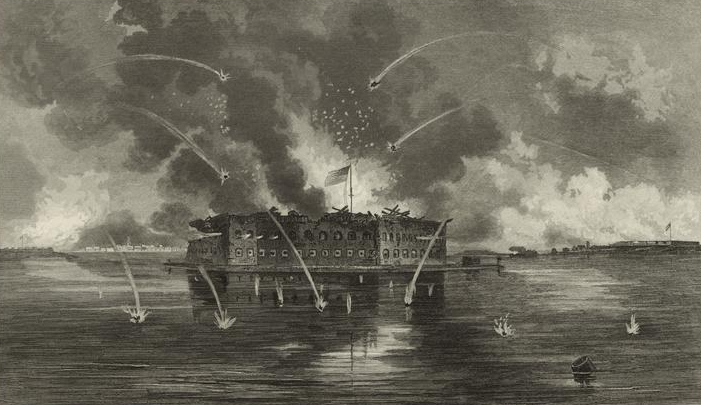
Bombardment of Fort Sumter, 1861. George Edward Perine (1837-1885), engraver.

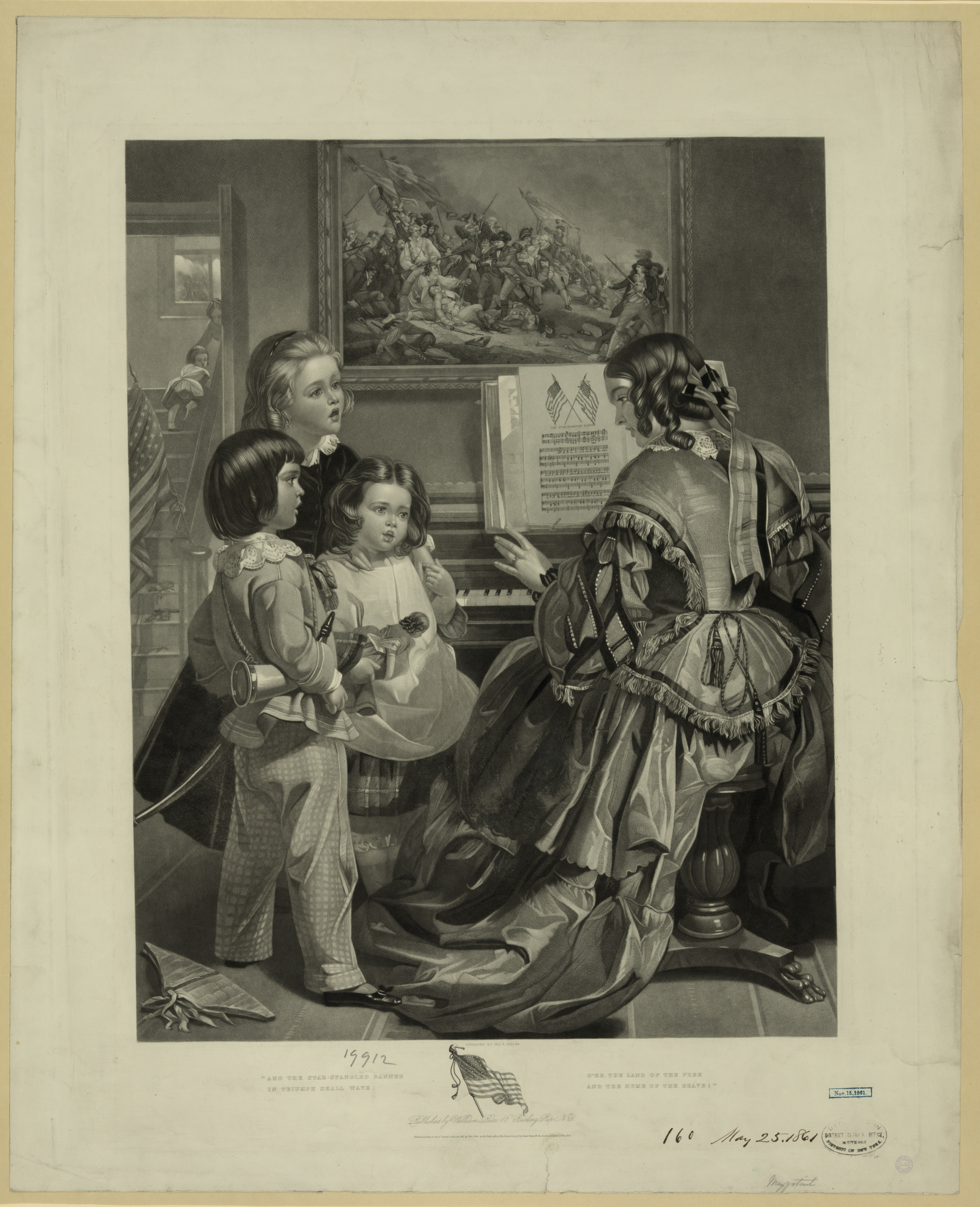
"The star-spangled banner, in triumph shall wave, o'er the land of the free

George Edward Perine (July 9, 1837 – February 3, 1885) was an artist, engraver, and publisher. In 1852, he began engraving for Thomas Doney in New York and in 1856-1858 for W.W. Rice, a line and bank-note engraver. He engraved in mezzotint a large plate, entitled “The Signing of the Compact in the Cabin of the Mayflower,” before he was nineteen years old. He was employed by New York engravers in 1858-1860 and in 1860 began engraving on his own and soon established a successful business in New York City. He mainly did portrait engraving and though he had many engravers in his employ, it is said that he finished every plate himself. Among his best known productions were the engravings entitled "The Better Land", dedicated to the poet Henry Wadsworth Longfellow, published in 1866; "The Good Part", published a few years later; and a series of portraits on steel of distinguished men which appeared in The Eclectic Magazine. Of the books published by him, the most noteworthy were: "History of the Fifty-First Congress" (illustrated), and "A History of New York City", by Benson John Lossing, LL.D., the historian.

George Edward Perine was born July 9, 1837, at South Orange, New Jersey, a son of Joseph and Sarah Decker Perine, and a descendant of Daniel Perrin, "The Huguenot". He married Augusta Moore on June 15, 1859, and had eight children. He died February 3, 1885, at Brooklyn, New York.
