= Edward Martineau Perine =

Edward Martineau Perine (July 31, 1809 – June 5, 1905) was a merchant and planter in Cahaba, Alabama. Born at Southfield, Staten Island, New York, a son of Edward and Addra Guyon Perine, and a descendant of Daniel Perrin, "the Huguenot", Perine moved to Cahaba, Alabama, in the early 1830s, where he became a wealthy merchant and plantation owner. As early as 1832, Perine entered business as a partner with Thomas Moreng and Richard Conner Crocheron in the firm of Thomas Moreng and Company. Following Moreng's death in 1835, the business was dissolved and replaced by the partnership of Perine and Crocheron. Their store was located on the corner of Vine and Second North Streets in Cahaba, directly opposite Bell's Hotel. In 1850 Perine bought Crocheron's interest in the business and the storehouse and in 1853 Perine sold his mercantile establishment to the partnership of Samuel M. Hill and John R. Sommerville. In 1856, he was once again in business, this time in partnership with Sommerville in the firm of E. M. Perine and Company. The partnership dissolved in 1858, with Sommerville continuing as a salesman for E. M. Perine and Company. In 1860 Perine was in partnership again, this time as Perine and Hunter. Anna M. Gayle Fry, writing in her book Memories of Old Cahaba, describes E. M. Perine as "a merchant prince of ante-bellum days, a Northern gentleman of the old school who was universally beloved by all who knew him." Following the Civil War, Perine's business at Cahaba was ruined, as his daughter Mary E. Perine Tucker put it, having "lost all".

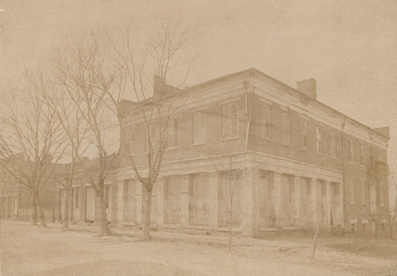
The Perine Store.

Perine first married Mary Eliza Snow (1816–1838) of Providence, Rhode Island, on September 13, 1836, in Milledgeville, Georgia. She died at Cahaba, Alabama, from complications of childbirth. The union produced one child, Mary Eliza Perine (b. 1838). Married twice, first to John M. Tucker and second to James H. Lambert, Mary Eliza Perine Tucker wrote in an autobiography,

My father! It is said I am especially fond of gentlemen. Why should I not be? My father was a gentleman; and, judging all men by him (my standard of a true, honorable, noble image of the Almighty's master-piece) how can I keep, if simply out of respect for my father, from loving his sex? My father! That one word contained my child-world. He was to me all—mother, father, sister, brother, and everything except grandmother; for I had a grandmother. . . .

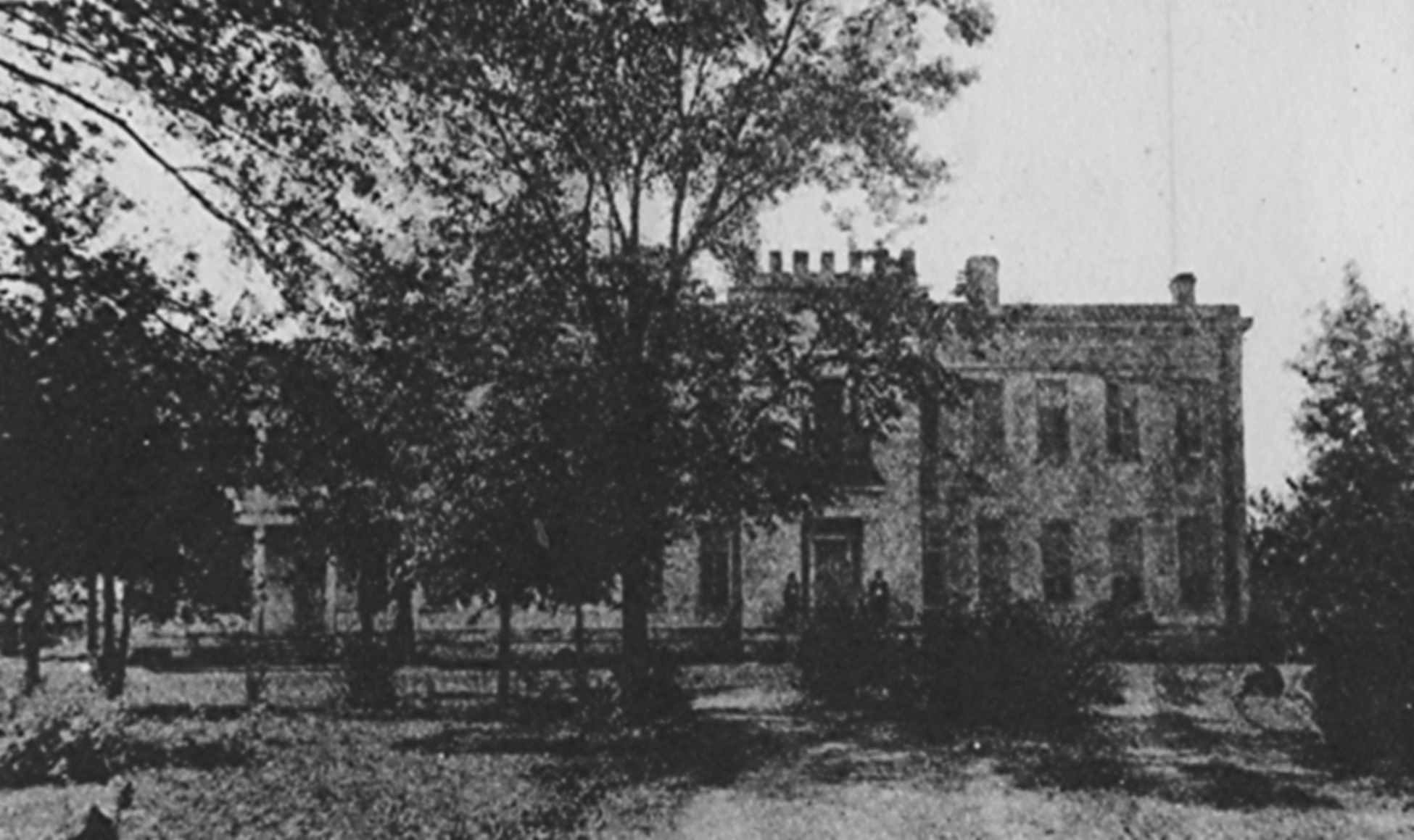
Perine Mansion in Cahaba, Alabama.

Perine's second marriage was to Frances E. "Fannie" Hunter (1825 - 1910) of Sparta, Conecuh County, Alabama, on August 6, 1846. Mrs. Perine was the daughter of Judge John Starke Hunter and Theodesia Jones Hunter. To Edward and Fannie Perine were born four daughters: Sarah Hunter "Sally" Perine (1848–1864), Addra A. Perine (1849–1905), Frances Hunter "Fannie" Perine (1852–1855) and Anna Hunter Perine (b. 1858).

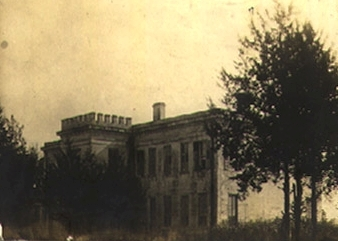
Perine Mansion in the 1890s.

In 1856, Perine purchased a brick factory building at the foot of Vine Street in Cahaba and hired architect John G. Snediker to prepare plans to convert the factory into a two-story mansion with twenty-six rooms. The first floor included two parlors (20 feet by 27 feet each), separated by sliding doors, a dining room (also about 20 feet by 27 feet), a sitting room, a library, two entry halls and vestibule. The second floor had bedrooms and nurseries. An attached wing included a kitchen, a laundry, a breakfast room, pantries, servants' quarters and other features. On the grounds of the estate were a conservatory, vineries, and an artesian well, with a flow now estimated at 1,250 gallons per minute. At the time it was thought to be the deepest well in the world, at nine hundred feet. It had a stream of water gushing and falling into a large cement basin, from which it was channeled off through the grounds in cement branches to the pastures beyond. Water from this well was also forced through pipes into the mansion, making it the first air conditioned home in Alabama.

Edward Martineau Perine died June 5, 1892, and was buried at the Presbyterian Cemetery at Pleasant Hill, Dallas County, Alabama. His widow, Frances E. "Fannie" Hunter Perine died April 4, 1910, and was also buried there.

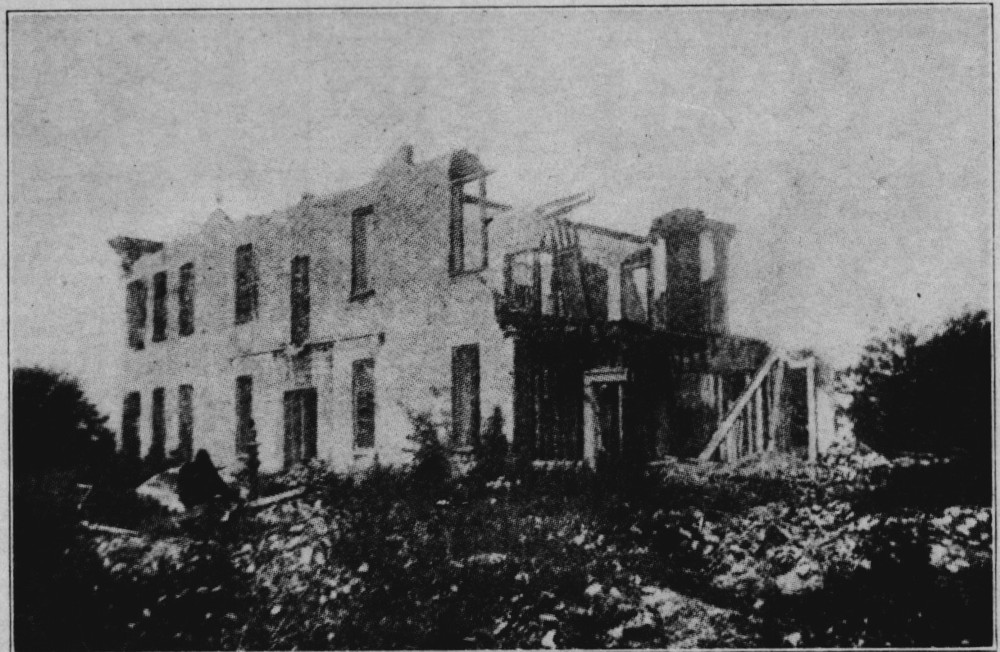
Perine Mansion Ruins.
