= Laurence Perrine =

Southern Methodist professor

Laurence Dollins Perrine (October 13, 1915 – April 27, 1995) was a Southern Methodist University professor whose literature textbooks became standard works nationwide. He was the son of Lorenzo Brown Perrine and Mary Edmond (née) Dollins, and a descendant of Daniel Perrin, "The Huguenot".

Perrine earned B.A. and M.A. degrees from Oberlin College and a Ph.D. from Yale University. He began his distinguished career as a member of SMU's English faculty in 1946 and was named the Daisy Deane Frensley Professor of English Literature in 1968.

Perrine's works include textbooks on the appreciation of poetry and fiction entitled Sound and Sense and Story and Structure, first published in 1956 and 1959 respectively. Both of these went through many editions during Perrine's lifetime and are still in use in posthumously edited new editions. Sound and Sense was originally developed for use in his poetry class; it became one of the most influential works in modern American education. Many of the principles of both Sound and Sense and Story and Structure contributed to a secondary-level literature textbook co-edited by Perrine entitled Adventures in Appreciation (1st ed. 1968), part of Harcourt Brace Jovanovich's Adventures in Literature Program. Perrine was also the author of books of limericks.

Perrine was one of the founders of SMU's Phi Beta Kappa chapter in 1949. In his honor, the chapter awards a Perrine Prize each year to a member of SMU's undergraduate faculty in liberal studies.

Perrine retired in 1980 and was awarded an honorary doctorate by SMU in 1988.

Perrine met his wife, Catherine, when she was teaching freshman English at SMU from 1948 to 1950. She was active in Texas environmental politics, with a special interest in water planning. When she died in 2006, she left a $3.3 million bequest to establish an endowed chair in English at SMU as well as a scholarship fund.

A paragraph about judging a poem by evaluating its perfection and significance from the 15th chapter of Perrine's book Sound and Sense was used in Dead Poets Society (1989). Perrine asks: "How fully has it accomplished its purpose?” and “How important is its purpose?”
