= Lisa Shoman =

Belizean lawyer and politician

Lisa Shoman SC
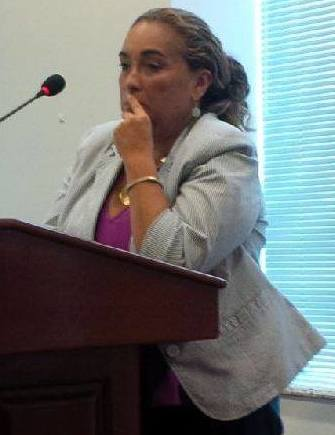
- Shoman in 2015

Foreign Minister of Belize
- In office June 2007 – February 2008
- Preceded by: Eamon Courtenay
- Succeeded by: Wilfred Elrington

Member of the Senate of Belize
- In office June 2007 – 2008

Belizean Ambassador to the United States
- In office 24 August 2000 – 5 June 2007
- Preceded by: James Schoffield Murphy
- Succeeded by: Nestor Mendez

Personal details
- Born: 27 January 1964 (age 62) British Honduras
- Party: People's United Party
- Spouse: Joey Clarke
- Education: University of the West Indies; Norman Manley Law School

Lisa Shoman SC (born 27 January 1964) is a Belizean attorney, politician, judge, and former diplomat. Shoman served as Foreign Minister of Belize and as a member of the Senate of Belize from 2007 to 2008. Prior to this, she served concurrently as Ambassador to the United States and as Permanent Representative to the Organisation of American States (OAS) from 24 August 2000 until 5 June 2007. She was the first woman to serve as Ambassador to the United States.

== Early life ==
Lisa Shoman was born on 27 January 1964. She is the eldest of three daughters born to commercial pilot and businessman Yasin Shoman and Hilda Shoman (née Hoy). She completed her primary and secondary education in her native Belize, followed by legal studies at the University of the West Indies (Mona Campus) and the Norman Manley Law School in Jamaica.

== Career ==
Shoman was called to the bar in October 1988, and appointed Crown Counsel in the Office of the Director of Public Prosecutions (July 1988), serving for over a year before entering private practice. She was elected the first female president of the Bar Association of Belize in 1996.

While in her mid-30s, Shoman was appointed to chair the board of directors of Belize Telecommunications Limited (1998–2000). In December 2009, she was elevated to the rank of Senior Counsel by the then Chief Justice of Belize, Dr Abdulai Conteh.

Her first national appointment came in 2000 when she became Ambassador/Permanent Representative of Belize to the Organization of American States on August 25, 2000, and she served concurrently as High Commissioner of Belize to Canada until 2003. She was also appointed Belize’s ambassador to the United States in August 2000. During her tenure, Shoman served as vice-chair of the Permanent Council of the OAS.

In June 2007, then Prime Minister Said Musa appointed her to the Senate of Belize, and made her the country’s first female Minister of Foreign Affairs & Foreign Trade. Shoman held this position until Musa’s party, the People's United Party, ceded power in 2008, when she returned to private practice.

Shoman has remained an active advocate, heading the legal team challenging controversial constitutional changes proposed by the ruling United Democratic Party. When Prime Minister Dean Barrow alleged that his predecessor, Said Musa had secretly diverted public funds and charged him with theft, Shoman was on the legal team that ensured Musa’s acquittal.

The-then Leader of the Opposition, Johnny Briceño appointed Shoman as a Senator for a second time in 2009. In 2017, Shoman was chosen to serve on the Inter-American Development Bank’s (IDB) Administrative Tribunal. In 2019, it was reported that Shoman would work on proposed cybercrime legislation in Belize.

== Political positions ==
Shoman is a proponent of cannabis legalization in Belize, arguing in a 2017 op-ed that the country should legalize and tax cannabis sales. She argued that legalizing the sale of cannabis would benefit the country's tourism industry.

== Personal life ==
In 2009, Shoman married Caribbean writer Joey Clarke.
