= List of spouses of the prime minister of Belize =

Spouse of the Prime Minister of Belize
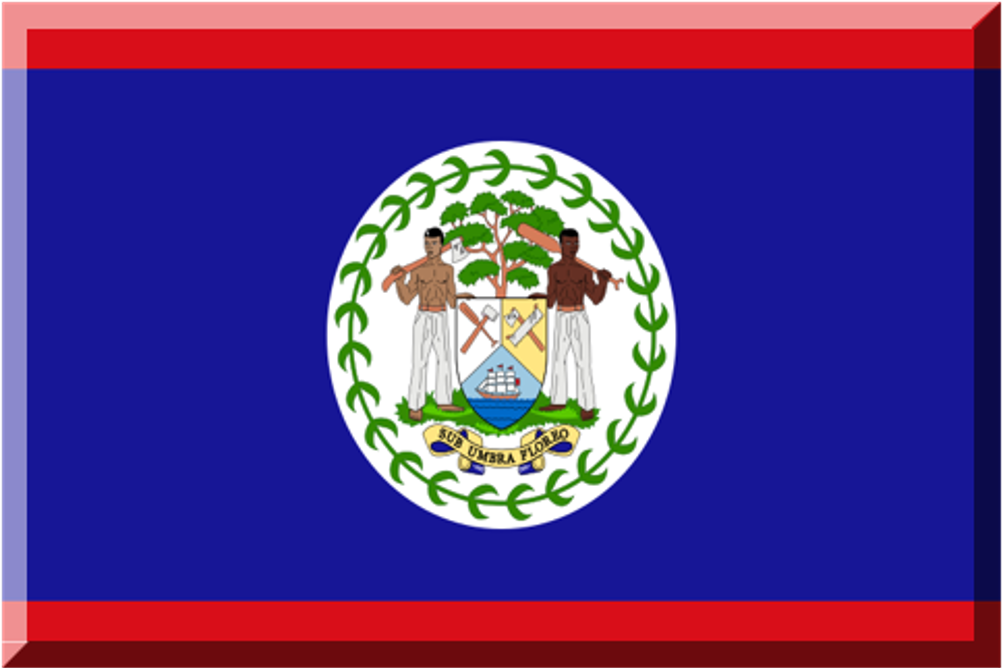

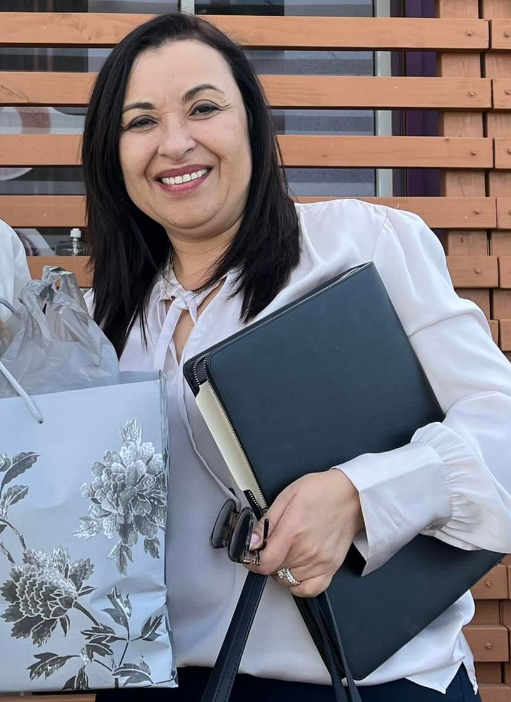
- Incumbent; Rossana Briceño since November 12, 2020

To date, four women have been married to the Prime Minister of Belize. George Cadle Price is the only Prime Minister to be unmarried. The spouse of the prime minister of Belize is not officially defined in the constitution, but the role generally involves a combination of public duties, charity work, and social responsibilities. The role does not involve a salary. The incumbent is Her Excellency Rossana Briceño, who assumed the role on November 12, 2020, upon her husband, Hon. John Briceño, becoming the Prime Minister of Belize.

== Role and Responsibilities ==
The role of the Spouse of the Prime Minister of Belize, while unofficial, typically includes:

- Representing the country at various national and international events.
- Supporting and advocating for social causes and charitable organizations.
- Working to improve the welfare and development of families and children in Belize.
- Participating in cultural, social, and ceremonial activities.

== Her Excellency Rossana Briceño ==
Rossana Maria Briceño (née Pérez) was born on July 26, 1968, in Orange Walk, Belize. She is married to Hon. John Briceño, the current Prime Minister of Belize. They have three children—Daniel, John, and Andre—and a granddaughter named Celeste.

Rossana Briceño holds a master's degree in Educational Leadership from the University of North Florida and a bachelor's degree in Special Education from Northeastern Illinois University (NEIU). She has dedicated her career to education, particularly special education, serving for over three decades at St. Peter's Anglican School, where she also served as principal.

On January 22, 2021, Rossana Briceño was appointed as the Special Envoy for the Development of Families and Children. In this capacity, she advocates for the rights and welfare of Belizean families and children, focusing on inclusive education and support for those with special needs.

== List of Spouses of the Prime Minister of Belize ==
Spouse	Prime Minister	Start of Tenure	End of Tenure
None	George Cadle Price	1981	1984
Kathleen Levy	Manuel Esquivel	1984	1989
None	George Cadle Price	1989	1993
Kathleen Levy	Manuel Esquivel	1993	1998
Joan Musa	Said Musa	1998	2008
Kim Simplis Barrow	Dean Barrow	2008	2020
Rossana Briceño	Johnny Briceño	2020	present
