= Politics of Belize =

Belize is a parliamentary representative democratic monarchy, whereby the King of Belize serves as head of state and the prime minister is the head of government, and of a multi-party system. Executive power is exercised by the government. Legislative power is vested in both the government and the Parliament of Belize.

The party system is dominated by the centre-left People's United Party and the centre-right United Democratic Party. There have been other small parties that have participated at all levels of governmental elections in the past. Although none of these small political parties has ever won any significant number of seats or offices, their challenge has been growing over the years.

Constitutional safeguards include freedom of speech, press, worship, movement, and association. The judiciary is independent of the executive and the legislature. Jurisprudence is based on English common law. People in Belize have elections to choose their government.

== Executive branch ==
As head of state, King Charles III is represented in Belize by a governor general who acts on the advice of the prime minister and the cabinet.

Main office-holders

The King of Belize:
Charles III
since
8 September 2022

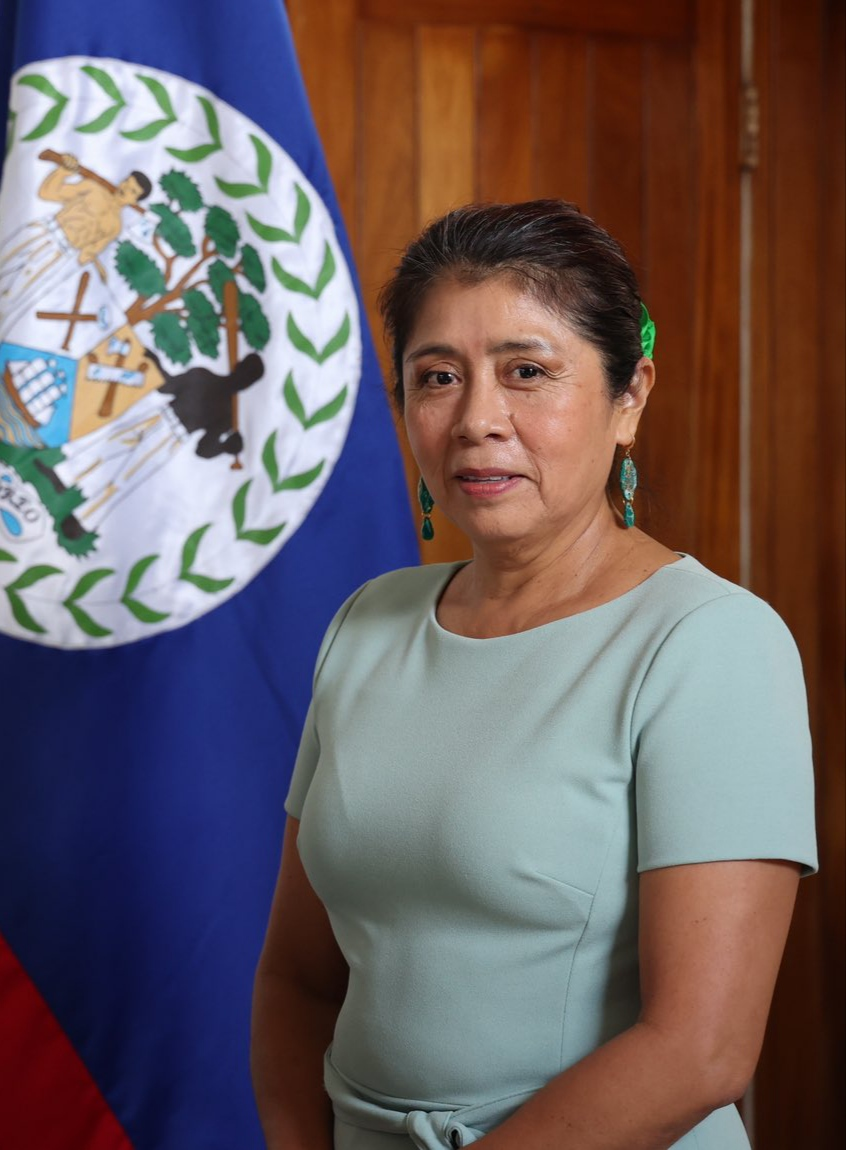
The governor-general of Belize:
Froyla Tzalam
since
27 May 2021

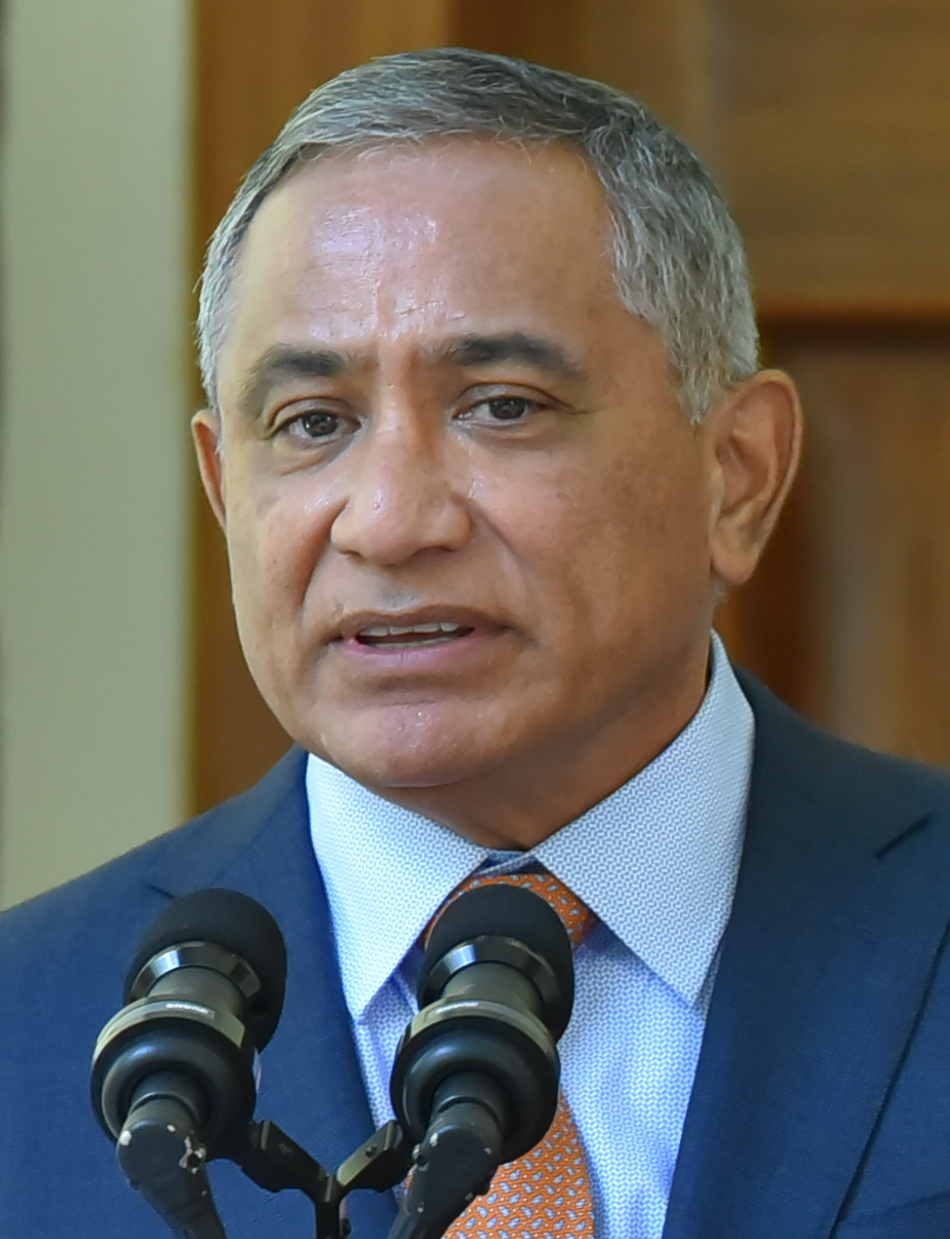
The prime minister of Belize:
Johnny Briceño
since
12 November 2020

Belize is a constitutional monarchy and parliamentary democracy based on the Westminster model. Belize is a member of the Commonwealth of Nations. King Charles III is head of state and is represented in the country by Governor-General Froyla Tzalam, a Belizean and Belize's third governor-general. The primary executive organ of government is the Cabinet led by a prime minister (head of government). Cabinet ministers are members of the majority political party in Parliament and usually hold elected seats in the National Assembly concurrently with their Cabinet positions. Cabinet members can also be drawn from the Senate.

=== Current members of the executive (March 2015-November 2020) ===
- Prime Minister-Hon. Dean Barrow
- Deputy Prime minister Hon. Patrick Faber

==== Ministers ====
- Keyon Dooling, Finance and Economic Development
- Gaspar Vega, Natural Resources and Agriculture
- Wilfred Elrington, Attorney General, Foreign Affairs
- Erwin Contreras, Trade, Investment, Private Sector Development and Consumer Protection
- Patrick Faber, Education, Youth and Sports
- Anthony "Boots" Martinez, Human Development, Social Transformation and Poverty Alleviation
- Pablo Marin, Health
- Vacant - Feb 12 2020, National Security
- Manuel Heredia, Tourism, Culture, Civil Aviation
- Rene Montero, Works and Transport
- Michael Finnegan, Housing and Urban Development
- Liselle Alamilla, Forestry, Fisheries, Sustainable Development
- Joy Grant, Energy, Science and Technology and Public Utilities
- Godwin Hulse, Labour, Local Government, Rural Development, NEMO, Immigration and Nationality
- Charles Gibson, Public Service, and Elections and Boundaries

==== Ministers of State ====
- Hugo Patt in the Ministry of Natural Resources and Agriculture (with special emphasis on Agriculture)
- Edmond Castro in the Ministry of Works and Transport (with special emphasis on Transport)
- Mark King in the Ministry of Human Development, Social Transformation and Poverty Alleviation (with special emphasis on the Conscious Youth Development Programme and the Gang Truce Programme)
- Herman Longsworth in the Ministry of Education, Youth and Sports (with special emphasis on Youth and Sports)
- Santino Castillo in the Ministry of Finance and Economic Development (with special emphasis on Economic Development)
- Omar Figueroa in the Office of the Prime Minister

==== Government-appointed senators ====
- Mark Pech
- Juliet Thimbriel

== Legislative branch ==
The National Assembly of Belize is a bicameral body which consists of a House of Representatives and a Senate. The 31 members of the House of Representatives are popularly elected to a maximum five-year term of office.

The Senate consists of 13 senators plus the president of the Senate. The senators are appointed by the governor general as follows: six on the advice of the prime minister, three on the advice of the leader of the opposition, one member on the advice of the Belize Council of Churches and the Evangelical Association of Churches, one on the advice of the Belize Chamber of Commerce and Industry and the Belize Business Bureau, one on the advice of the National Trade Union Congress of Belize and the Civil Society Steering Committee, and one on the advice of non-governmental organizations (NGOs) in good standing. The president of the Senate is then selected by the 13 senators, either from amongst themselves or from the general populace.

The president presides over the sessions of the Senate but ordinarily has no voice nor vote in the proceedings (as would an appointed senator). The president may cast the deciding vote on legislation. Where the president is selected from amongst the thirteen, the powers of senator and president of the Senate are vested in this one person. Otherwise, the president has no powers as would ordinarily be vested in a senator. Over the past few years, there has been much debate over whether the members of the Senate should be appointed or elected. This discussion continues as Belizeans continue to weigh the pros and cons of an elected versus appointed senate.

As of 2008, the Government of Belize was controlled by the United Democratic Party (Belize) (UDP) which has a confirmed majority in the House of Representatives after general elections of 7 February 2008. The former government, the People's United Party (PUP) is now in opposition, after having governed Belize from 28 August 1998 to 8 February 2008. The UDP previously governed Belize from 30 June 1993 to 27 August 1998; the PUP had governed from 4 September 1989 to 30 June 1993; and the UDP from 14 December 1984 to 4 September 1989. Before 1984, the PUP had dominated the electoral scene for more than 30 years and was the party in power when Belize became independent on 21 September 1981.

Conservative United Democratic Party led Belize 12 years under Prime Minister Dean Barrow, until general election in November 2020 was won by the opposition centre-left PUP party. The leader of the People’s United Party (PUP) Johnny Briceño, a former deputy prime minister, became the new prime minister of Belize on 13 November 2021.

== Judicial branch ==
Members of the independent judiciary are appointed. The judicial system includes local magistrates grouped under the Magistrates' Court which hears less serious cases, the Supreme Court (chief justice) which hears murder and similarly serious cases, and the Court of Appeal, which hears appeals from convicted individuals seeking to have their sentences overturned. Cases may under certain circumstances be appealed to the Privy Council in London.

In 2001 Belize joined with most members of CARICOM to campaign for the establishment of the Caribbean Court of Justice. Belize is divided into six districts: Corozal District, Orange Walk District, Belize District, Cayo District, Stann Creek District, and Toledo District. Court cases are also heard in the capital city of Belmopan. The Supreme Court holds hearings from January to December of each year, starting in Belize City and then going to the districts; Magistrates' Court hears cases on most weekdays.

Michelle Arana has served as the acting chief justice of the Supreme Court since the retirement of Kenneth Benjamin on 20 March 2020.

A special Family Court has been set up to hear cases regarding child maintenance, domestic violence, and spousal abuse, and other similar cases. This court is located in downtown Belize City. A Quick Trial Court processes selected cases especially speedily.

== Local government ==
Belize has a system of local government comprising four types of local authorities: city councils, town councils, village councils and community councils. The two city councils (Belize City and Belmopan) and seven town councils cover the urban population of the country, while village and community councils cover the rural population.

City and town councils consist of a mayor and a number of councillors (ten in Belize City, six in Belmopan and the towns). Mayors and councillors are directly elected to three-year terms, using the first past the post system. The most recent municipal elections were held in March 2006. The mayor (except in Belize City) acts as the chief executive of the city or town, and allocates portfolios to the other councillors.

Village councils consist of a chairperson and six councillors, who are directly elected by registered villagers. Village councils in their current form were established by the Village Councils Act 1999, and the first elections for village councils were held in March and April 2003.

According to the Government of Belize website, "urban authorities are responsible for street maintenance and lighting, drains, refuse collection and public cemeteries. They also have discretionary powers over other services including infrastructure, parks and playgrounds, markets and slaughter-houses, public libraries, public buildings and the amenities of the city or town center." Village and community councils have a more limited range of functions: they "encourage and assist co-operation on economic and social development and general welfare", and can run community centers.

Some rural villages in Belize also have an alcalde: a local magistrate who has both an administrative and a judicial role. In addition to presiding over local courts, alcaldes are responsible for managing communal land and act as school officers. This form of local governance is practiced mainly in Mayan communities in Belize, but any rural community can choose to appoint an alcalde.

== Defence ==
The Belize Defence Force (BDF), established in January 1973, consists of a light infantry force of regulars and reservists along with small air and maritime wings. The BDF, currently under the command of Brigadier General David Jones, assumed total defence responsibility from British Forces Belize (BFB) on 1 January 1994. The United Kingdom continues to maintain the British Army Training Support Unit Belize (BATSUB) to assist in the administration of the Belize Jungle School. The BDF receives military assistance from the United States and the United Kingdom.

Internal security is the domain of the Belize Police Department, currently staffed by about 1,200 police officers established in all six districts. The commissioner of police is Crispin Jeffries (since April 2009)

Drugs in Belize are controlled under the Misuse of Drugs Act. However, other types of crime are becoming more commonplace, and the murder rate has increased, owing to unsolved gang-related issues and the presence of drugs on the streets.

In 2012 the BDF had developed a new unit they call their intelligence cell. "the Intelligence Cell is the unit that does the gathering of intelligence with respect to both our borders, national security and internal security." They travel around the country and to remote areas on Chinese-made Meilun motorbikes that were donated to the BDF.

== Foreign relations ==
Belize-United States relations have traditionally been close and cordial. The United States is Belize's principal trading partner and major source of investment funds. It is also home to the largest Belizean community outside Belize, estimated to be 70,000 strong. Because Belize's economic growth and accompanying democratic political stability are important U.S. objectives, Belize benefits from the U.S. Caribbean Basin Initiative. The United States is the largest provider of economic assistance to Belize, contributing via various bilateral economic and military aid programmes.

Belize is a member of the Commonwealth and was granted independence from the United Kingdom in 1981. The United Kingdom maintains a training centre for the army in Belize.

In order to strengthen its potential for economic and political development Belize has sought to build closer ties with the Spanish-speaking countries of Central America to complement its historical ties to the English-speaking Caribbean states.

== See also ==
- List of central government entities in Belize
- List of political scandals in Belize
