= Erwin Contreras =

Belizean politician and footballer (born 1966)

Member of the Belize House of Representatives for Cayo West
- In office 27 August 1998 – 11 November 2020
- Preceded by: Amin Hegar
- Succeeded by: Jorge Espat

Personal details
- Born: 9 July 1966 (age 60) Benque Viejo del Carmen, British Honduras
- Party: United Democratic Party

Erwin Rafael "Winchi" Contreras (born 9 July 1966) is a Belizean politician and former footballer. From 2008 to 2012 he was the Minister of Economic Development, Commerce, Industry and Consumer Protection in Belize. After the 2012 election he was made Minister of Trade Investment, Private Sector Development and Consumer Protection.

== Biography ==
He was born in Benque Viejo del Carmen, Cayo District, Belize.

At one point, Contreras was second in the line of succession to Prime Minister Dean Barrow, behind Deputy Prime Minister Patrick Faber. He belongs to the United Democratic Party.

Contreras is a former member of the Belize national football team. He played in both of Belize's 1998 World Cup qualification games against Panama in 1996.

== Electoral history ==
Contreras was first elected to the Belize House of Representatives in 1998, defeating Amin Hegar of the People's United Party by 10 votes. Bucking a national trend, Contreras was the only UDP candidate to defeat a PUP House incumbent in 1998 and one of only three UDP members elected nationwide that year. Contreras won re-election with at least 54 percent of the vote in every election through 2015.

Contreras was defeated at the 2020 Belizean general election by Jorge "Milon" Espat .
