= Alamilla =

Alamilla is a surname. Notable people with the surname include:

- Celita Alamilla (born 1943), Mexican politician
- Lisel Alamilla (born 1967), Belizean politician
- Marcela Vieyra Alamilla (1963–2019), Mexican politician
- Nan Alamilla Boyd, American academic and historian
