= Belize People's Front =

- Leader: Nancy Marin
- Chairman: Jaime Marin
- Founded: 2013
- Headquarters: 3 Paslow Lane, San Ignacio, Belize
- Ideology: Progressivism; Social democracy
- Political position: Centre-left
- Continental affiliation: São Paulo Forum
- Colors: Pink, Gray
- Seats in the Senate: 0 / 12
- Seats in the House: 0 / 31
- Local government: 0 / 67

Party flag

Website
- http://belizepeoplesfront.com

The Belize People's Front (Spanish: Frente Popular de Belice, BPF) is a Belizean progressive and social democratic centre-left political party founded in 2013. The BPF made its electoral debut in the 2020 Belizean general election on 11 November 2020, in which it fielded 13 candidates and became the third largest political party in the country. BPF's leader Nancy Marin is the first female political party leader in Belize.

== Political Leader ==
Key:

BPF UDP PUP

PM: Prime Minister

LO: Leader of the Opposition

| Leader | Term of Office | | Position | Prime Minister |
|---|---|---|---|---|
| Nancy Marin | October 2018 | Incumbent | | Barrow |
| Nancy Marin | October 2018 | Incumbent | | Briceño |

== Electoral history ==
=== House of Representatives ===
| Election | Party leader | Votes | | | Seats | | Position | Government |
| Election | Party leader | No. | % | ± | No. | ± | Position | Government |
|---|---|---|---|---|---|---|---|---|
| 2020 | Nancy Marin | 820 | 0.56 | | 0 / 31 | | 3rd | PUP |
