= Elijio Briceño =

Belizean politician and businessman

Minister of Energy and Communications
- In office 1979–1984
- Prime Minister: George Cadle Price

Member of the Belize House of Representatives for Orange Walk North
- In office 1974–1979
- Preceded by: Elito Urbina
- Succeeded by: Ruben Campos

Personal details
- Born: Elijio Eloy Briceño c. 1938 Orange Walk Town, British Honduras
- Died: 21 May 2016 (aged 78) Belize City, Belize
- Party: People's United Party
- Relations: Johnny Briceño (son)
- Education: St. John's College

Elijio Eloy Briceño (c. 1938 – 21 May 2016) was a Belizean politician, businessman and convicted criminal. A member of the People's United Party (PUP), Briceño represented Orange Walk North in the Belize House of Representatives and served as Minister of Energy and Communications under Prime Minister George Cadle Price from 1979 to 1984.

In 1985, he was convicted of conspiring to import marijuana and cocaine into the United States and sentenced to seven years in prison. Briceño is the father of current Prime Minister of Belize Johnny Briceño.

== Early life ==
Briceño was one of five children born to Felipa Chan and John Briceño. His mother was a Mayan woman. He was educated at St. John's College.

== Career ==
Briceño worked as a teacher and served as chairman of the Belize Sugar Cane Farmers Association. He followed his older brother Leopoldo ("Polo"), the mayor of Orange Walk Town, into politics, serving on the Orange Walk Town Council and representing the Orange Walk North constituency in the British Honduras Legislative Assembly and, after independence in 1981, the Belize House of Representatives. He was involved in the construction of Orange Walk People's Stadium.

Briceño served as minister of energy and communications under Prime Minister George Cadle Price until the government's defeat at the 1984 Belize legislative election. In 1999, he was appointed as a commissioner of the Supreme Court of Belize, authorising him to take affidavits and declarations as well as examine witnesses by special order of the court.

== Drug trafficking ==
In April 1985, Briceño was arrested in a hotel in Miami by agents of the U.S. Drug Enforcement Administration. He was subsequently charged with three counts of conspiring to import illegal drugs and one count of "using telephones in furtherance of a felony". It was alleged that he had negotiated with undercover DEA agents to supply 5,000 pounds of marijuana each month through Wilmington, North Carolina, with a value of $175,000 (equivalent to $500,000 in 2025). Briceño had flown to Miami to accept a $35,000 (equivalent to $100,000 in 2025) down payment. Three others, including his brother Renan and nephew Charro, were also indicted but were not present in the United States to be prosecuted. The full indictment alleged that the Briceños were running a "family marijuana business" and that the agents had been told they would "supply airstrips and the marijuana and use the police and military to keep our people away".

In September 1985, Briceño was sentenced to seven years in prison and fined $50,000 (equivalent to $100,000 in 2025). In addition to the marijuana, he was also charged with conspiring to smuggle 50 kilograms (110 lb) of cocaine. His defense attorney argued that the case was politically motivated and delivered a petition signed by 3,100 Belizeans calling for his release. The presiding judge William Earl Britt stated that he would be allowed to serve his sentence in low-security prison camps.

== Personal life ==
Briceño was nicknamed "Don Joe" or "Boss Joe". He had seven sons and three daughters, including future prime minister Johnny Briceño.

Briceño died in a Belize City hospital on 21 May 2016 at the age of 78, having been in poor health since a stroke eleven years earlier. He was buried at the Piemonte Cemetery in Orange Walk, following a state funeral at the Church of La Inmaculada attended by Prime Minister Dean Barrow and Governor-General Colville Young.
