= Cannabis in Belize =

The use of cannabis in Belize is common and largely tolerated; however, possession can result in fines or imprisonment. Possession or use of 10 grams or less on private premises was decriminalized in November 2017.

== History ==
Until the 1980s, Belize was the fourth-largest exporter of cannabis to the United States, behind Colombia, Mexico, and Jamaica. Since the mid-1980s, Belize's production has dropped dramatically due to eradication efforts by the Belizean government, supported by the United States. By 1994, Belizean production was at "negligible levels."

== Use ==
According to a 2016 report by the United Nations Office on Drugs and Crime approximately 8.5% of all Belizeans use cannabis. Belize was ranked 18th out of all countries in prevalence of cannabis use, higher than both the Netherlands and Jamaica.

== Decriminalization ==
In 2012, the Government of Belize announced that it was considering decriminalizing possession of small amounts of cannabis. The US State department claims that "Through the first 10 months of 2014, Belizean authorities eradicated over 100,000 cannabis plants". On October 20, 2017, the House of Representatives passed an amendment to the Misuse of Drugs Act decriminalizing possession or use of 10 grams or less on private premises. The bill was signed into law in early November by the Governor General, despite objections from the National Evangelical Association of Belize.

== Legalization ==
Although legalization of cannabis has never been officially considered by the government, some prominent public figures in Belize have supported the idea. In 2017, the Leader of the Opposition, John Briceño, stated, "It is time for us to stop locking up our young people for a stick of weed. The time has come for us to decriminalize marijuana smoking and prepare the necessary research to move to legalizing marijuana for medicinal purposes and in small quantities."

In a 2017 op-ed, former Senator Lisa Shoman stated, "There is no rational excuse to refuse to move past decriminalization to legalization of personal use amounts for adults." In 2024, it was reported that the Ministry of New Growth Industries was assessing the prospect of cannabis legalization.

== Tourism ==
In 2016, an American tourist off a cruise ship was arrested for purchasing 1.8 grams of cannabis in Belize City. Her charges were dismissed, with the judge noting the cannabis was sold openly to her and she appeared to believe it was legal, and she was cautioned against ever possessing drugs in Belize again.
