= Cayo West =

Electoral constituency in Belize

- Constituency for the Belize House of Representatives
- District: Cayo
- Electorate: 6,351 (2012)
- Major settlements: Benque Viejo del Carmen, San Jose Succotz

Current constituency
- Created: 1984
- Party: United Democratic Party
- Area Representative: Muigel Gurrea

Cayo West is an electoral constituency in the Cayo District represented in the House of Representatives of the National Assembly of Belize since 2025 by Mugiel Gurrea of United Democratic Party (UDP ).

== Profile ==
The Cayo West constituency was one of 10 new seats created for the 1984 general election. Cayo West consists of an area in west-central Cayo District abutting the Guatemalan border. The border town of Benque Viejo del Carmen is the constituency's main settlement.

== Area representatives ==
Election	Area representative	Party
1984	Pedro Guerra Mena	UDP
1989	Miguel Ruiz	PUP
1993	Amin Hegar	PUP
1998	Erwin Contreras	UDP
2003	Erwin Contreras	UDP
2008	Erwin Contreras	PUP
2012	Erwin Contreras	UDP
2015	Erwin Contreras	UDP
2020	Jorge Espat	PUP
2025	Miguel Guerra	UDP

== Elections ==
Election	Political result	Candidate	Party	Votes	%	±%
2025 general election Electorate: 7,674; Turnout: 5,115 (66.65%) −15.95	UDP gain from PUP; Majority: 326 (4.29 6.38%) +2.09	Miguel Guerra	UDP	2,612	51.07	+3.86
2025 general election Electorate: 7,674; Turnout: 5,115 (66.65%) −15.95	UDP gain from PUP; Majority: 326 (4.29 6.38%) +2.09	Jorge Espat	PUP	2,286	44.69	−6.81
2025 general election Electorate: 7,674; Turnout: 5,115 (66.65%) −15.95	UDP gain from PUP; Majority: 326 (4.29 6.38%) +2.09	Esduit Ariel Moralez	Belizeans Justice Movement	66	1.29	-
2020 general election Electorate: 6,465; Turnout: 5,340 (82.60%) +6.48	PUP gain from UDP; Majority: 225 (4.29%) -19.57	Jorge Espat	PUP	2,703	51.50	+14.21
2020 general election Electorate: 6,465; Turnout: 5,340 (82.60%) +6.48	PUP gain from UDP; Majority: 225 (4.29%) -19.57	Erwin Contreras	UDP	2,478	47.21	−13.94
2020 general election Electorate: 6,465; Turnout: 5,340 (82.60%) +6.48	PUP gain from UDP; Majority: 225 (4.29%) -19.57	Eduardo Raul Ayala	Belize People's Front	68	1.29	-
2015 general election Electorate: 7,068; Turnout: 5,380 (76.12%) −1.00	UDP hold Majority: 1,284 (23.86%) -3.37	Erwin Contreras	UDP	3,290	61.15	-1.71
2015 general election Electorate: 7,068; Turnout: 5,380 (76.12%) −1.00	UDP hold Majority: 1,284 (23.86%) -3.37	Lesbia Lissette Guerra	PUP	2,006	37.29	+1.66
2012 general election Electorate: 6,351; Turnout: 4,898 (77.12%) −3.44	UDP hold Majority: 1,334 (27.23%) +2.51	Erwin Contreras	UDP	3,079	62.86	+1.66
2012 general election Electorate: 6,351; Turnout: 4,898 (77.12%) −3.44	UDP hold Majority: 1,334 (27.23%) +2.51	Oscar Sabido	PUP	1,745	35.63	−0.85
2008 general election Electorate: 5,621; Turnout: 4,528 (80.56%) −5.74	UDP hold Majority: 1,119 (24.72%) +15.26	Erwin Contreras	UDP	2,771	61.2	+6.94
2008 general election Electorate: 5,621; Turnout: 4,528 (80.56%) −5.74	UDP hold Majority: 1,119 (24.72%) +15.26	Kendall Mendez	PUP	1,652	36.48	−8.32
2008 general election Electorate: 5,621; Turnout: 4,528 (80.56%) −5.74	UDP hold Majority: 1,119 (24.72%) +15.26	Marta Aguallo Hendrix	VIP	40	0.88	-
2003 general election Electorate: 4,656; Turnout: 4,018 (86.3%) −8.01	UDP hold Majority: 380 (9.46%) +9.13	Erwin Contreras	UDP	2,180	54.26	+4.66
2003 general election Electorate: 4,656; Turnout: 4,018 (86.3%) −8.01	UDP hold Majority: 380 (9.46%) +9.13	Kendall Mendez	PUP	1,800	44.8	−4.47
1998 general election Electorate: 3,286; Turnout: 3,099 (94.31%) +15.68	UDP gain from PUP; Majority: 10 (0.33%) −10.67	Erwin Contreras	UDP	1,537	49.6	+5.1
1998 general election Electorate: 3,286; Turnout: 3,099 (94.31%) +15.68	UDP gain from PUP; Majority: 10 (0.33%) −10.67	Amin Hegar	PUP	1,527	49.27	−6.23
1993 general election Electorate: 3,168; Turnout: 2,491 (78.63%) −0.54	PUP hold Majority: 273 (11.0%) +5.8	Amin Hegar	PUP	1,382	55.5	+4.1
1993 general election Electorate: 3,168; Turnout: 2,491 (78.63%) −0.54	PUP hold Majority: 273 (11.0%) +5.8	Guillermo Valdez	UDP	1,109	44.5	−1.7
1989 general election Electorate: 2,539; Turnout: 2,010 (79.17%) −1.83	PUP gain from UDP; Majority: 104 (5.2%) −6.8	Miguel Ruiz	PUP	1,033	51.4	+8.7
1989 general election Electorate: 2,539; Turnout: 2,010 (79.17%) −1.83	PUP gain from UDP; Majority: 104 (5.2%) −6.8	Carlos Leon	UDP	929	46.2	−8.5
1984 general election Electorate: 2,042; Turnout: 1,654 (81.0%) n/a	UDP win Majority: 198 (12.0%) n/a	Pedro Guerra Mena	UDP	904	54.7	-
1984 general election Electorate: 2,042; Turnout: 1,654 (81.0%) n/a	UDP win Majority: 198 (12.0%) n/a	Mac Alamilla	PUP	706	42.7	-
