= 2020 Belizean general election =

- 11 November 2020

All 31 seats in the House of Representatives 16 seats needed for a majority
- Registered: 182,815
- Turnout: 81.86% (▲9.17pp)
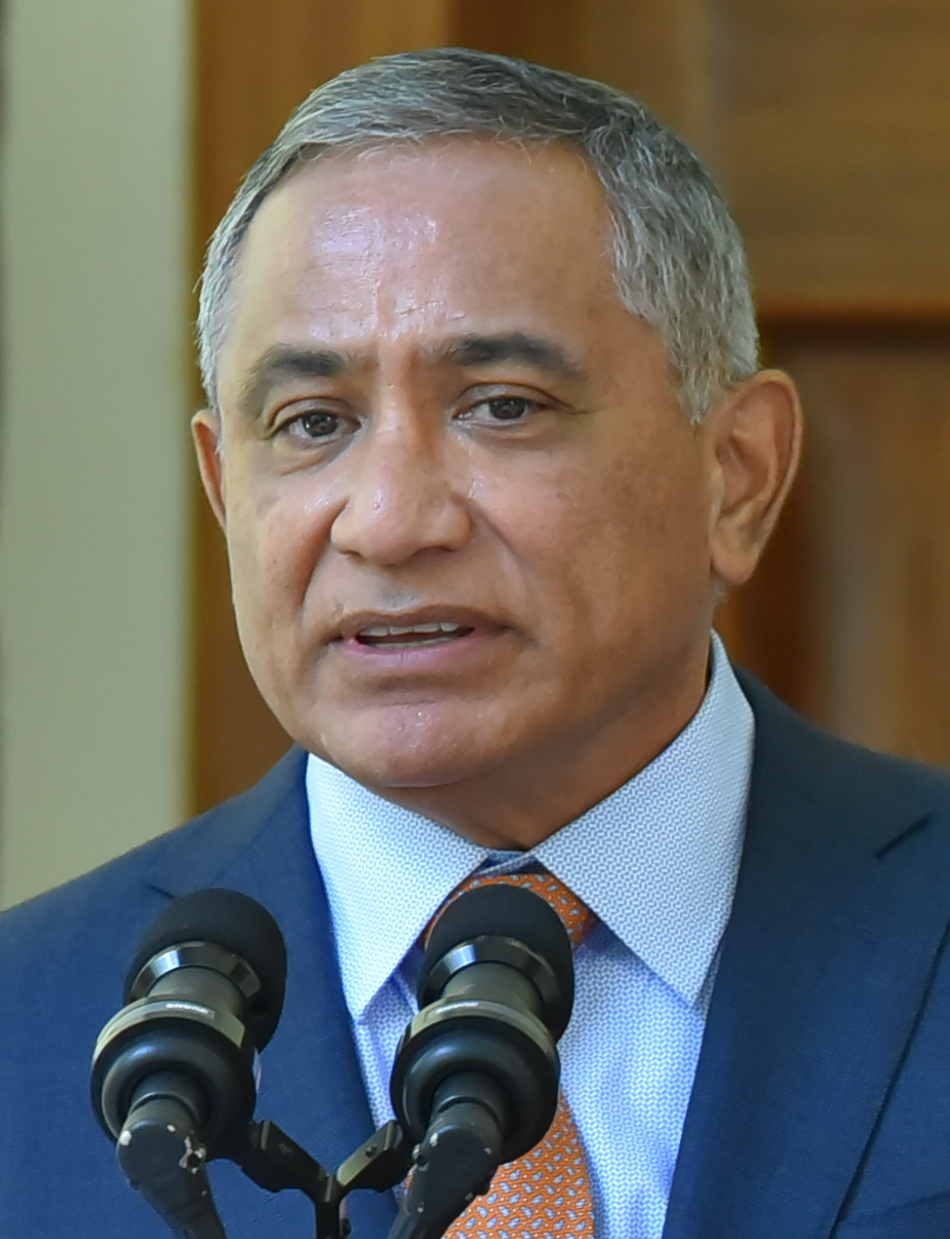

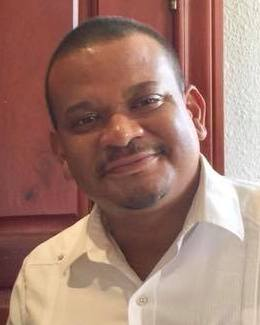
| | First party | Second party |
|---|---|---|
| Leader | Johnny Briceño | Patrick Faber |
| Party | PUP | UDP |
| Leader's seat | Orange Walk Central | Collet |
| Last election | 47.77%, 12 seats | 50.52%, 19 seats |
| Seats won | 26 | 5 |
| Seat change | ▲14 | ▼14 |
| Popular vote | 88,040 | 57,374 |
| Percentage | 59.60% | 38.84% |
| Swing | ▲11.83 pp | ▼11.68 pp |
- Results by constituency
Prime Minister before election
Dean Barrow
UDP
Elected Prime Minister
Johnny Briceño
PUP

General elections were held in Belize on 11 November 2020 to elect the 31 members of the House of Representatives. Nomination day was 21 October.

The People's United Party achieved its first national election victory since 2003, winning 26 seats, while the incumbent United Democratic Party had its worst result since 1998, winning the remaining 5 seats. Despite the effects of the ongoing COVID-19 pandemic and a recent tropical storm, election turnout was over 81%, the highest since 1998.

The election also featured the first female party leader and Prime Ministerial candidate in Belizean general election history: Nancy Marin, leader of the Belize People's Front.

Several high-profile MP's also chose not to contest the elections. The previous prime minister, Dean Barrow (UDP), was constitutionally required to step down after serving three terms in office; having been an MP since 1984, he also decided to retire from the House. His predecessor as prime minister, Said Musa (PUP), also chose to retire; Musa was the last remaining MP to have served before independence in 1981.

== Date ==
The previous general elections were held on 4 November 2015, and the new National Assembly was opened on 13 November 2015. According to Section 84 of the Constitution of Belize, the National Assembly must be dissolved "five years from the date when the two Houses of the former National Assembly first met" unless dissolved sooner by the Governor-General of Belize upon the advice of the prime minister. A general election must be called within three months of a dissolution, which meant the latest possible date for the next Belizean general election would be 13 February 2021.

Despite the five-year term, three of the last four general elections had been called at least a year early. Both Prime Minister Dean Barrow and the opposition People's United Party were on record supporting the reduction of the maximum term of the National Assembly to four years.

Barrow initially stated his intention to retire as Prime Minister no later than the end of 2019, but changed his mind to stay on until 2020 at the urging of his Cabinet. However, he said that he would still retire as the United Democratic Party Leader at the party's national convention and leadership election, which was first tentatively scheduled for 9 February 2020. He strongly hinted at a snap election in early 2020. But in May 2019, Barrow dismissed that remark and said that elections would be held in November 2020.

On 5 October 2020, Barrow called the elections for 11 November, with Nominations Day on 21 October. The Writ of Election was formally filed by the Governor-General immediately afterwards. He advised the Governor-General to dissolve the National Assembly on 6 October.

The Belize Peace Movement (BPM), a civil society organisation, filed a court petition in December 2019 for a redistricting process to be held before the next elections. In the BPM's view, the district map in use did not reflect the distribution of the population, leading to unequal representation. As no action had been taken by the court before the election announcement on 6 October, the BPM filed for a Supreme Court injunction on 13 October to delay the election until this process could be completed. The PUP joined the case on the side of the government, arguing that they would lose their campaign money if the election were to be delayed. On 28 October, acting Chief Justice Michelle Arana ruled in favour of the Government: as the election process had already begun and the National Assembly had already been dissolved, the court did not have jurisdiction to intervene.

During election week, Tropical Storm Eta led to flooding in parts of the country. While Barrow acknowledged that postponing the election would be possible (with the approval of the participating parties), he decided to stay with 11 November as there was no explicit provision for postponement in the Constitution.

== Debates ==
For the first time since 1998, a Prime Ministerial debate was held, organized jointly by the Belize Chamber of Commerce and Industry (BCCI), Galen University and LOVE FM. It was scheduled for 28 October, and the rules and format were taken from the Jamaica Debates Commission. The questions were submitted by a variety of local NGO's, business associations, and unions. As of 23 October, three of the four invited party leaders had announced their participation in the debate. The remaining invitee, Johnny Briceño of the PUP, wanted to meet privately with the organizers before deciding to participate. The organizers had already released the debate rules publicly; since one of the rules prohibited private communication between the organizers and the participants, the organizers did not reply to the PUP. Patrick Faber of the UDP then decided not to participate either. In the end, the debate was held between Belize Progressive Party leader Patrick Rogers and Belize People's Front leader Nancy Marin. The debate was livestreamed on each of the organizer's Facebook pages, attracting 33,500 viewers overall.

At the constituency level, the Dangriga-based NGO "Citizens for Good Governance" (CGG) organized a debate on 3 November between the two challenger candidates, Louis Zabaneh (PUP) and John Suazo (BPF). The incumbent, Frank Mena (UDP), declined to participate. This debate was broadcast live on Dangriga Cable Vision (Channel 58). It was also livestreamed from the Facebook pages of the CGG, Southern Belize Media, and Tropical Vision Limited.

== Background ==
=== Contesting parties ===
With the exception of the Belize Progressive Party, led by Patrick Rogers in the 2015 elections, all parties were contesting under first-time leaders.

| Party | Position | Ideology | Leader (since) | Slogan and Manifesto | Campaign Song |
|---|---|---|---|---|---|
| United Democratic Party (UDP) | Centre-right | Conservatism | Patrick Faber (October 2020) | "Because YOUR Future Matters" | "Your Future Matters!" "Staying with the UDP" |
| People's United Party (PUP) | Centre to centre-left | Christian democracy Social democracy Nationalism | Johnny Briceño (January 2016) | "#PlanBelize" | "Vote BLU, Everybody fi win" (Todos Ganamos)" |
| Belize Progressive Party (BPP) | Centre-left to left-wing | Social democracy Reformism; Republicanism | Patrick Rogers (September 2015) | "Changing the system in Belize" | "For Progress! BPP for Belize!" |
| Belize People's Front (BPF) | Centre to centre-left | Progressivism Christian democracy | Nancy Marin (October 2013) | "Breaking Corruption. Building a Nation." | "Time fi mek di change" "BELIZE" |

=== UDP ===
The ruling United Democratic Party, in power since 2008, attempted to win a fourth consecutive general election. However, as the Constitution of Belize limits the Prime Minister to three terms in office, the UDP needed to contest with a new leader. To this end, the incumbent UDP leader and Prime Minister Dean Barrow had stated his intention to step down from both posts in the months leading up to the election. The UDP tentatively scheduled a May 2019 convention to name Barrow's successor as party leader, but in January 2019 the date was pushed back to February 2020. Deputy Prime Minister Patrick Faber and Belmopan Area Representative John Saldivar contested the position. Minister of Foreign Affairs and Pickstock Area Representative Wilfred Elrington had also been mentioned as a possible candidate, but did not stand in the convention.

On 9 February 2020, Saldivar was elected UDP leader over Faber, but three days later was forced to resign after allegations surfaced he accepted US$50,000 from accused fraudster Lev Dermen, who was on trial in Salt Lake City. Saldivar was also stripped of his Cabinet post.

On 12 July 2020, a second leadership convention was held with Faber, Saldivar, and Elrington as candidates. This time, Faber won with a margin of 19 votes over Saldivar (286 to 267). Elrington received 10 votes. Faber was formally inaugurated as party leader on 9 October, with Barrow continuing to serve as Prime Minister until the elections.

=== PUP ===
Despite gains in Belize City in 2015, most notably Kareem Musa's upset win over Belize City Mayor Darrell Bradley in the Caribbean Shores constituency, the opposition PUP remained at 11 seats overall thanks to losses in the Cayo and Corozal Districts. For its leader, the PUP chose Johnny Briceño, who had served as Deputy Prime Minister in the previous PUP administration. Francis Fonseca, who led the party during the past two general elections, resigned from leadership soon after the party's 2015 loss. Although Briceño served a previous term as PUP leader from 2008 to 2011, he had yet to lead the party during a general election. Briceño, who represented a constituency in Orange Walk Town, was the first PUP member to lead the party in an election from outside Belize City. Belizean news sources pointed out that the PUP nominated only 2 female candidates out of 31 total, while the UDP had nominated 5.

=== BPP ===
The Belize Progressive Party, which made its electoral debut in 2015 but failed to win any seats, announced its intention to contest nine seats, of which they ultimately filed for eight.

=== BPF ===
The Belize People's Front, a progressive party, announced its intention to contest 17 seats, of which they ultimately filed for 13. The party was founded in 2013, but this was its first general election. BPF leader Nancy Marin was the first female political party leader in Belize.

== Retirements ==
The election was marked by several high-profile retirements. Fonseca had initially indicated that he would not stand in this election. However, he decided to stay for the last time. Former PUP leader Said Musa also stood down from his seat in this election. Musa, who contested the Belize City-based Fort George constituency in every election since 1974, was the sole remaining House member from before Belize's 1981 independence from Great Britain.

On the UDP side, former Deputy Prime Minister Gaspar Vega also announced that he would stand down. Other announced UDP retirements include Barrow – who had served in the Belize House continuously since 1984 – and Michael Finnegan, who had been in office since 1993. Moses Barrow, Dean Barrow's son and Finnegan's nephew, was nominated to succeed Finnegan as the UDP standard bearer in the Mesopotamia constituency. Veteran UDP Area Representative Wilfred Elrington also did not seek re-election.

== Results ==
At the invitation of the Belizean Ministry of Foreign Affairs, CARICOM sent a six-member observation team. The team's preliminary statement showed the elections to have been conducted in a smooth and timely manner; they especially commended the election commission's ability to implement COVID-19 sanitary measures while dealing with the effects of Tropical Storm Eta.

The polls closed at 6:15 pm. With the early counts already forecasting a lead for the PUP, Faber delivered a concession speech on television three hours later, congratulating Briceño and the PUP while calling for national unity. Election turnout was over 81%, the highest since 1998.

The results showed the PUP achieving its first national election victory since 2003, winning 26 seats. By contrast, the incumbent United Democratic Party had its lowest result since 1998, winning the remaining 5 seats. Four of the five UDP seats were in Belize City: Faber and Tracy Panton retained their seats, while Denise Barrow and Shyne Barrow won seats of retiring UDP members. The fifth seat was in Corozal, retained by incumbent Deputy Prime Minister Hugo Patt.

Briceño was sworn in as the new Prime Minister on 12 November by the Governor-General. He intended to swear in his cabinet on 16 November.

| Party | Votes | % | Seats | +/– |
|---|---|---|---|---|
| People's United Party | 88,040 | 59.60 | 26 | +14 |
| United Democratic Party | 57,374 | 38.84 | 5 | –14 |
| Belize People's Front | 820 | 0.56 | 0 | New |
| Belize Progressive Party | 548 | 0.37 | 0 | 0 |
| Independents | 924 | 0.63 | 0 | 0 |
| Total | 147,706 | 100.00 | 31 | 0 |
| Valid votes | 147,706 | 98.70 | | |
| Invalid/blank votes | 1,944 | 1.30 | | |
| Total votes | 149,650 | 100.00 | | |
| Registered voters/turnout | 182,815 | 81.86 | | |
Source: Elections and Boundaries Department

=== By division ===
| Division | Electorate | Turnout | % | Candidate | Party | Votes | % |
|---|---|---|---|---|---|---|---|
| Albert | 2,886 | 2,531 | 87.70 | Tracy Ann Panton | United Democratic Party | 1,271 | 50.82 |
| Albert | 2,886 | 2,531 | 87.70 | Paul Adrian Thompson | People's United Party | 1,230 | 49.18 |
| Albert | 2,886 | 2,531 | 87.70 | Rejected votes | | 30 | 1.19 |
| Belize Rural Central | 7,445 | 5,956 | 80.00 | Dolores Balderamos-Garcia | People's United Party | 3,409 | 58.67 |
| Belize Rural Central | 7,445 | 5,956 | 80.00 | Beverly Williams | United Democratic Party | 2,166 | 37.28 |
| Belize Rural Central | 7,445 | 5,956 | 80.00 | Lion Bennett | Belize Progressive Party | 181 | 3.12 |
| Belize Rural Central | 7,445 | 5,956 | 80.00 | Luz Maria Hunter | Belize People's Front | 54 | 0.93 |
| Belize Rural Central | 7,445 | 5,956 | 80.00 | Rejected votes | | 146 | 2.45 |
| Belize Rural North | 4,721 | 3,903 | 82.67 | Marconi Prince Leal | People's United Party | 2,238 | 58.01 |
| Belize Rural North | 4,721 | 3,903 | 82.67 | Edmond "Clear The Land" Castro | United Democratic Party | 1,568 | 40.64 |
| Belize Rural North | 4,721 | 3,903 | 82.67 | Karen Sharon Banner | Belize Progressive Party | 52 | 1.35 |
| Belize Rural North | 4,721 | 3,903 | 82.67 | Rejected votes | | 45 | 1.15 |
| Belize Rural South | 8,586 | 6,887 | 80.21 | "Andre" Perez | People's United Party | 4,336 | 63.84 |
| Belize Rural South | 8,586 | 6,887 | 80.21 | Manuel Heredia | United Democratic Party | 2,419 | 35.62 |
| Belize Rural South | 8,586 | 6,887 | 80.21 | Thomas Henry Greenwood Jr. | Belize People's Front | 37 | 0.54 |
| Belize Rural South | 8,586 | 6,887 | 80.21 | Rejected votes | | 95 | 1.38 |
| Belmopan | 8,758 | 6,943 | 79.28 | Oscar Mira | People's United Party | 4,172 | 60.82 |
| Belmopan | 8,758 | 6,943 | 79.28 | John Birchman Saldivar | United Democratic Party | 2,004 | 29.21 |
| Belmopan | 8,758 | 6,943 | 79.28 | Anna "ABG" Banner-Guy | Independent | 684 | 9.97 |
| Belmopan | 8,758 | 6,943 | 79.28 | Rejected votes | | 83 | 1.20 |
| Caribbean Shores | 4,363 | 3,726 | 85.40 | Kareem David Musa | People's United Party | 2,194 | 59.60 |
| Caribbean Shores | 4,363 | 3,726 | 85.40 | Lee Mark Chang | United Democratic Party | 1,487 | 40.40 |
| Caribbean Shores | 4,363 | 3,726 | 85.40 | Rejected votes | | 45 | 1.21 |
| Cayo Central | 8,107 | 6,219 | 76.71 | Alex Balona | People's United Party | 3,434 | 55.99 |
| Cayo Central | 8,107 | 6,219 | 76.71 | Rene Montero | United Democratic Party | 2,699 | 44.01 |
| Cayo Central | 8,107 | 6,219 | 76.71 | Rejected votes | | 86 | 1.38 |
| Cayo North | 8,058 | 6,679 | 82.89 | Michel "Micho" Chebat | People's United Party | 3,745 | 56.77 |
| Cayo North | 8,058 | 6,679 | 82.89 | Omar Figueroa | United Democratic Party | 2,790 | 42.29 |
| Cayo North | 8,058 | 6,679 | 82.89 | Kurt Mathew Lizarraga | Belize People's Front | 62 | 0.94 |
| Cayo North | 8,058 | 6,679 | 82.89 | Rejected votes | | 82 | 1.23 |
| Cayo North East | 5,706 | 4,764 | 83.49 | Orlando "Landy" Habet | People's United Party | 2,996 | 63.35 |
| Cayo North East | 5,706 | 4,764 | 83.49 | John Francis August Jr. | United Democratic Party | 1,674 | 35.40 |
| Cayo North East | 5,706 | 4,764 | 83.49 | Nefretery "Nancy" Martin | Belize People's Front | 59 | 1.25 |
| Cayo North East | 5,706 | 4,764 | 83.49 | Rejected votes | | 35 | 0.73 |
| Cayo South | 7,069 | 5,261 | 74.42 | Julius Espat | People's United Party | 4,071 | 78.53 |
| Cayo South | 7,069 | 5,261 | 74.42 | Ramon Francisco Witz | United Democratic Party | 1,113 | 21.47 |
| Cayo South | 7,069 | 5,261 | 74.42 | Rejected votes | | 77 | 1.46 |
| Cayo West | 6,465 | 5,340 | 82.60 | Jorge "Milon" Espat | People's United Party | 2,703 | 51.50 |
| Cayo West | 6,465 | 5,340 | 82.60 | Erwin Rafael Contreras | United Democratic Party | 2,478 | 47.21 |
| Cayo West | 6,465 | 5,340 | 82.60 | Eduardo Raul Ayala | Belize People's Front | 68 | 1.29 |
| Cayo West | 6,465 | 5,340 | 82.60 | Rejected votes | | 91 | 1.70 |
| Collet | 3,732 | 3,037 | 81.38 | Patrick Faber | United Democratic Party | 1,834 | 61.63 |
| Collet | 3,732 | 3,037 | 81.38 | Oscar "Polo" Arnold | People's United Party | 1,142 | 38.37 |
| Collet | 3,732 | 3,037 | 81.38 | Rejected votes | | 61 | 2.01 |
| Corozal Bay | 5,410 | 4,475 | 82.72 | David "Dido" Vega | People's United Party | 2,402 | 54.37 |
| Corozal Bay | 5,410 | 4,475 | 82.72 | Pablo Marin | United Democratic Party | 1,994 | 45.13 |
| Corozal Bay | 5,410 | 4,475 | 82.72 | Carlos Javier Sawers | Independent | 22 | 0.50 |
| Corozal Bay | 5,410 | 4,475 | 82.72 | Rejected votes | | 57 | 1.27 |
| Corozal North | 7,000 | 6,155 | 87.93 | Hugo Patt | United Democratic Party | 3,479 | 56.96 |
| Corozal North | 7,000 | 6,155 | 87.93 | David Castillo | People's United Party | 2,563 | 41.96 |
| Corozal North | 7,000 | 6,155 | 87.93 | Alfonso Acosta | Belize People's Front | 66 | 1.08 |
| Corozal North | 7,000 | 6,155 | 87.93 | Rejected votes | | 47 | 0.76 |
| Corozal South East | 7,012 | 6,138 | 87.54 | Florencio Julian Marin Jr. | People's United Party | 3,413 | 55.97 |
| Corozal South East | 7,012 | 6,138 | 87.54 | Antonio "Tony" Herrera | United Democratic Party | 2,614 | 42.87 |
| Corozal South East | 7,012 | 6,138 | 87.54 | Eloim Ellis | Belize People's Front | 57 | 0.93 |
| Corozal South East | 7,012 | 6,138 | 87.54 | Edna Doris Diaz | Belize Progressive Party | 14 | 0.23 |
| Corozal South East | 7,012 | 6,138 | 87.54 | Rejected votes | | 40 | 0.65 |
| Corozal South West | 5,888 | 5,130 | 87.13 | Ramiro Ramirez | People's United Party | 2,898 | 56.91 |
| Corozal South West | 5,888 | 5,130 | 87.13 | Angel Campos | United Democratic Party | 2,142 | 42.07 |
| Corozal South West | 5,888 | 5,130 | 87.13 | Laurencio Lucio Bul | Belize People's Front | 52 | 1.02 |
| Corozal South West | 5,888 | 5,130 | 87.13 | Rejected votes | | 38 | 0.74 |
| Dangriga | 5,482 | 4,212 | 76.83 | "Dr. Zab" Louis Zabaneh | People's United Party | 2,600 | 62.55 |
| Dangriga | 5,482 | 4,212 | 76.83 | Frank "Papa" Mena | United Democratic Party | 1,501 | 36.11 |
| Dangriga | 5,482 | 4,212 | 76.83 | John Francis Suazo | Belize People's Front | 56 | 1.34 |
| Dangriga | 5,482 | 4,212 | 76.83 | Rejected votes | | 55 | 1.31 |
| Fort George | 1,876 | 1,541 | 82.14 | Henry Charles Usher Sr. | People's United Party | 983 | 64.84 |
| Fort George | 1,876 | 1,541 | 82.14 | Melvin "Mello" Hewlett | United Democratic Party | 499 | 32.92 |
| Fort George | 1,876 | 1,541 | 82.14 | William "Wil" Maheia | Belize Progressive Party | 34 | 2.24 |
| Fort George | 1,876 | 1,541 | 82.14 | Rejected votes | | 25 | 1.62 |
| Freetown | 3,782 | 3,114 | 82.34 | Francis Fonseca | People's United Party | 2,114 | 68.79 |
| Freetown | 3,782 | 3,114 | 82.34 | Orson Jerome "OJ" Elrington | United Democratic Party | 959 | 31.21 |
| Freetown | 3,782 | 3,114 | 82.34 | Rejected votes | | 41 | 1.32 |
| Lake Independence | 4,863 | 3,958 | 81.39 | Cordel Hyde | People's United Party | 3,539 | 90.79 |
| Lake Independence | 4,863 | 3,958 | 81.39 | Dianne "Miss D" Finnegan | United Democratic Party | 359 | 9.21 |
| Lake Independence | 4,863 | 3,958 | 81.39 | Rejected votes | | 60 | 1.52 |
| Mesopotamia | 2,277 | 1,715 | 75.32 | Shyne Barrow | United Democratic Party | 910 | 54.79 |
| Mesopotamia | 2,277 | 1,715 | 75.32 | Candice Pitts | People's United Party | 751 | 45.21 |
| Mesopotamia | 2,277 | 1,715 | 75.32 | Rejected votes | | 54 | 3.15 |
| Orange Walk Central | 6,045 | 5,157 | 85.31 | Johnny Briceño | People's United Party | 2,902 | 56.87 |
| Orange Walk Central | 6,045 | 5,157 | 85.31 | Denni Grijalva | United Democratic Party | 2,140 | 41.94 |
| Orange Walk Central | 6,045 | 5,157 | 85.31 | Antonia Cruz Sanchez | Belize People's Front | 61 | 1.19 |
| Orange Walk Central | 6,045 | 5,157 | 85.31 | Rejected votes | | 54 | 1.05 |
| Orange Walk East | 7,033 | 6,038 | 85.85 | Kevin Bernard | People's United Party | 3,277 | 54.96 |
| Orange Walk East | 7,033 | 6,038 | 85.85 | Elodio "Son Of The East" Aragon Jr. | United Democratic Party | 2,612 | 43.80 |
| Orange Walk East | 7,033 | 6,038 | 85.85 | Lorenzo Adrian "Andy" Aldana | Belize People's Front | 74 | 1.24 |
| Orange Walk East | 7,033 | 6,038 | 85.85 | Rejected votes | | 75 | 1.24 |
| Orange Walk North | 7,833 | 6,785 | 86.62 | Ramon "Monchi" Cervantes | People's United Party | 4,043 | 60.09 |
| Orange Walk North | 7,833 | 6,785 | 86.62 | Carlos Zetina | United Democratic Party | 2,628 | 39.06 |
| Orange Walk North | 7,833 | 6,785 | 86.62 | Marino Assi | Belize People's Front | 57 | 0.85 |
| Orange Walk North | 7,833 | 6,785 | 86.62 | Rejected votes | | 57 | 0.84 |
| Orange Walk South | 6,858 | 5,782 | 84.31 | Jose Abelardo Mai | People's United Party | 3,499 | 61.34 |
| Orange Walk South | 6,858 | 5,782 | 84.31 | Guadalupe "Lupe" Dyck Magaña | United Democratic Party | 2,088 | 36.61 |
| Orange Walk South | 6,858 | 5,782 | 84.31 | Eber Misael Herrador | Belize People's Front | 117 | 2.05 |
| Orange Walk South | 6,858 | 5,782 | 84.31 | Rejected votes | | 78 | 1.35 |
| Pickstock | 3,997 | 3,281 | 82.09 | Anthony Robert Mahler | People's United Party | 2,570 | 80.21 |
| Pickstock | 3,997 | 3,281 | 82.09 | Anthony "Uncle Boots" Martinez | United Democratic Party | 574 | 17.92 |
| Pickstock | 3,997 | 3,281 | 82.09 | Patrick Raymond Rogers | Belize Progressive Party | 60 | 1.87 |
| Pickstock | 3,997 | 3,281 | 82.09 | Rejected votes | | 77 | 2.35 |
| Port Loyola | 4,717 | 3,649 | 77.36 | Gilroy Usher Sr. | People's United Party | 2,106 | 58.98 |
| Port Loyola | 4,717 | 3,649 | 77.36 | "Superman" Philip Willoughby | United Democratic Party | 1,313 | 36.77 |
| Port Loyola | 4,717 | 3,649 | 77.36 | "Boo Boo" Evan Thompson | Belize Progressive Party | 152 | 4.25 |
| Port Loyola | 4,717 | 3,649 | 77.36 | Rejected votes | | 78 | 2.14 |
| Queen's Square | 2,714 | 2,431 | 89.57 | Denise "Sista B" Barrow | United Democratic Party | 1,351 | 56.43 |
| Queen's Square | 2,714 | 2,431 | 89.57 | Allan Pollard | People's United Party | 1,020 | 42.61 |
| Queen's Square | 2,714 | 2,431 | 89.57 | Gary Matus | Belize Progressive Party | 23 | 0.96 |
| Queen's Square | 2,714 | 2,431 | 89.57 | Rejected votes | | 37 | 1.52 |
| Stann Creek West | 9,864 | 7,745 | 78.52 | Rodwell Stephen Ferguson | People's United Party | 4,900 | 64.23 |
| Stann Creek West | 9,864 | 7,745 | 78.52 | Ivan Hilbert Williams | United Democratic Party | 2,509 | 32.89 |
| Stann Creek West | 9,864 | 7,745 | 78.52 | Melvin Hulse | Independent | 179 | 2.35 |
| Stann Creek West | 9,864 | 7,745 | 78.52 | Hubert Alexander McCaulay | Belize Progressive Party | 32 | 0.42 |
| Stann Creek West | 9,864 | 7,745 | 78.52 | Mateo Tomas Polanco | Independent | 9 | 0.11 |
| Stann Creek West | 9,864 | 7,745 | 78.52 | Rejected votes | | 116 | 1.50 |
| Toledo East | 6,831 | 4,698 | 68.77 | Michael Espat | People's United Party | 2,869 | 61.65 |
| Toledo East | 6,831 | 4,698 | 68.77 | Dennis Garbutt | United Democratic Party | 1,755 | 37.71 |
| Toledo East | 6,831 | 4,698 | 68.77 | Orlando Albert Muschamp | Independent | 30 | 0.54 |
| Toledo East | 6,831 | 4,698 | 68.77 | Rejected votes | | 44 | 0.94 |
| Toledo West | 7,437 | 6,400 | 86.06 | Oscar Requena | People's United Party | 3,921 | 61.60 |
| Toledo West | 7,437 | 6,400 | 86.06 | Simeon Coc | United Democratic Party | 2,444 | 38.40 |
| Toledo West | 7,437 | 6,400 | 86.06 | Rejected votes | | 35 | 0.55 |
Source: Elections and Boundaries Department

== Reactions ==
- Guatemala: The Ministry of Foreign Affairs congratulated Briceño, as did President Alejandro Giammattei.
- Nicaragua: The President and Vice President sent a joint letter to congratulate "Brother Prime Minister" Briceño and the PUP, invoking the memory of George Cadle Price.
- Taiwan: President Tsai Ing-wen and the Ministry of Foreign Affairs congratulated Briceño and thanked outgoing PM Barrow, acknowledging the "longstanding friendship" between Taiwan and Belize.
- United States: The US Embassy commended the Belizean people "for upholding the democratic heritage of the hemisphere."

Additional congratulations were sent by the Organization of American States.
