= Eamon Courtenay =

Belizean politician (born 1960)

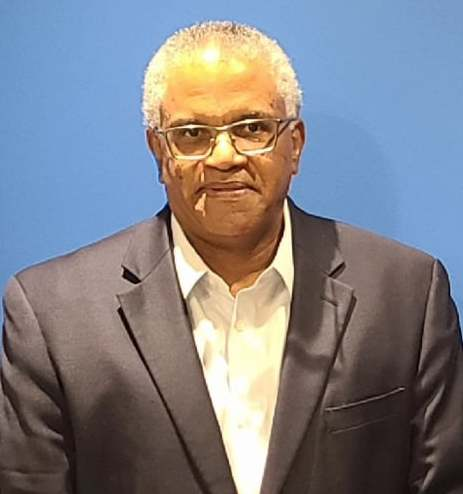
- Eamon Courtenay in 2021

Minister of Foreign Affairs
- In office 13 November 2020 – 31 December 2023
- Prime Minister: Johnny Briceño
- Succeeded by: Francis Fonseca

Member of the Senate
- Incumbent
- Assumed office November 2020

Personal details
- Born: Eamon Harrison Courtenay; 11 July 1960 (age 65)
- Party: People's United Party
- Parent: Vernon Courtenay (father)

Eamon Harrison Courtenay (born 11 June 1960) is a Belizean lawyer and politician. A member of the People's United Party, he has served as a member of the Senate since November 2020. Courtenay served as Minister of Foreign Affairs from 13 November 2020 to 31 December 2023, having previously held the position from 2006 to 2007.

== Family ==
His father Vernon Harrison Courtenay served as Minister of Foreign Affairs in the 1980s.

== Political career ==
Courtenay was first appointed to the Senate of Belize in 2006, and served at the helm of the Senate's Special Select Committee on Immigration between November 2017 to December 2018. He resigned from the Senate on 11 June 2019. He was appointed Minister of Foreign Affairs by Prime Minister Johnny Briceño in November 2020. His resignation from the Ministry of Foreign Affairs was confirmed by the government in December 2023. During his time as Foreign Minister, he established diplomatic relations with the Kingdom of Saudi Arabia.

== Political positions ==
Courtenay has expressed frustration over the ICJ's handling of the Belizean–Guatemalan territorial dispute. he has also criticized the "global north" for failing to ratify the Migrant Workers Convention leading to what he called abuses at Western borders, and also criticized developed countries for hoarding COVID-19 vaccines. Regarding foreign policy stances, he has supported Kenya's leadership of UN-approved forces in Haiti during the Haitian crisis, has condemended the United States designation of Cuba as a state sponsor of terrorism, endorsed Palestinian and Taiwanese statehood, and called for an end of the Russian invasion of Ukraine.

Specifically regarding Palestine, he has accused Israel of war crimes since 7 October, and called for an independent Palestine that followed the pre-Six-Day War borders. However, he has also called for the release of Israeli hostages.
