= Ministry of Finance (Belize) =

Government ministry of Belize

Agency overview
- Formed: 1961
- Jurisdiction: Belize Government of Belize
- Headquarters: 3rd Floor, Right Wing, Sir Edney Cain Building, Belmopan
- Minister responsible: John Briceño
- Parent agency: Government of Belize
- Website: mof.gov.bz

The Ministry of Finance is a government ministry of Belize responsible for public finances. Traditionally, Prime Minister of Belize has also held the portfolio of Minister of Finance.

== Ministers of Finance ==
- George Cadle Price, 1961-1984
- Manuel Esquivel, 1984-1989
- George Cadle Price, 1989-1993
- Manuel Esquivel, 1993-1998
- Said Musa, 1998-2003
- Ralph Fonseca, 2003-2004, first non-PM Minister of Finance
- Said Musa, 2004-2008
- Dean Barrow, 2008-2020
- John Briceño, 2020-

== See also ==
- Government of Belize
- Central Bank of Belize
- Economy of Belize
