= Collet (Belize House constituency) =

- Constituency for the Belize House of Representatives
- District: Belize
- Electorate: 3,741 (2022)
- Major settlements: Belize City (part)

Current constituency
- Created: 1961
- Party: People's United Party
- Area Representative: Devin Daly

Collet is an electoral constituency in the Belize District represented in the House of Representatives of the National Assembly of Belize since 2025 by Devin Daly of the People's United Party .

== Profile ==
The Collet constituency was created for the 1961 general election as part of a major nationwide redistricting. The constituency is based in areas of Belize City west of the city center, bordered by the Lake Independence, Port Loyola, Pickstock, Albert, Mesopotamia and Queen's Square constituencies.

Although less competitive in recent years, Collet has historically been the scene of several very close elections. Between 1965 and 1993 the winner was decided with less than one percent of the vote on four occasions.

== Area representatives ==
Election	Area representative	Party
1961	Albert Cattouse	PUP
1965	Albert Cattouse	PUP
1969	Vernon Courtenay	PUP
1974	Vernon Courtenay	PUP
1979	Vernon Courtenay	PUP
1984	Frank Lizama	UDP
1989	Remijio Montejo	PUP
1993	Faith Babb	UDP
1998	Remijio Montejo	PUP
2003	Patrick Faber	UDP
2008	Patrick Faber	UDP
2012	Patrick Faber	UDP
2015	Patrick Faber	UDP
2020	Patrick Faber	UDP
2025	Devin Daly	PUP

== Elections ==
Election	Political result	Candidate	Party	Votes	%	±%
2025 general election Electorate: 3,625; Turnout: 2,432 (67.09%) -14.29	PUP gain from UDP; Majority: 163 (7.00%) −15.78	Devin Daly	PUP	1,271	52.26	+12.89
2025 general election Electorate: 3,625; Turnout: 2,432 (67.09%) -14.29	PUP gain from UDP; Majority: 163 (7.00%) −15.78	Patrick Faber	UDP	1,108	45.56	-14.83
2020 general election Electorate: 3,732; Turnout: 3,037 (81.38%) +15.55	UDP hold Majority: 692 (22.78%) −6.41	Patrick Faber	UDP	1,834	60.39	−5.44
2020 general election Electorate: 3,732; Turnout: 3,037 (81.38%) +15.55	UDP hold Majority: 692 (22.78%) −6.41	Oscar "Polo" Arnold	PUP	1,142	38.37	+4.25
2012 general election Electorate: 4,627; Turnout: 3,046 (65.83%) −5.79	UDP hold Majority: 889 (29.19%) +10.95	Patrick Faber	UDP	1,949	63.99	+6.7
2012 general election Electorate: 4,627; Turnout: 3,046 (65.83%) −5.79	UDP hold Majority: 889 (29.19%) +10.95	Carolyn Trench-Sandiford	PUP	1,060	34.8	−4.25
2008 general election Electorate: 3,890; Turnout: 2,786 (71.62%) +5.19	UDP hold Majority: 508 (18.24%) +15.13	Patrick Faber	UDP	1,596	57.29	+7.19
2008 general election Electorate: 3,890; Turnout: 2,786 (71.62%) +5.19	UDP hold Majority: 508 (18.24%) +15.13	Carolyn Trench-Sandiford	PUP	1,088	39.05	−7.94
2008 general election Electorate: 3,890; Turnout: 2,786 (71.62%) +5.19	UDP hold Majority: 508 (18.24%) +15.13	Patrick Rogers	VIP	77	2.76	-
2003 general election Electorate: 2,848; Turnout: 1,892 (66.43%) −19.9	UDP gain from PUP; Majority: 59 (3.11%) −19.46	Patrick Faber	UDP	948	50.1	+12.39
2003 general election Electorate: 2,848; Turnout: 1,892 (66.43%) −19.9	UDP gain from PUP; Majority: 59 (3.11%) −19.46	Remijio Montejo	PUP	889	46.99	−13.29
2003 general election Electorate: 2,848; Turnout: 1,892 (66.43%) −19.9	UDP gain from PUP; Majority: 59 (3.11%) −19.46	Paul Jones	Independent	55	2.9	-
1998 general election Electorate: 2,479; Turnout: 2,140 (86.33%) +26.67	PUP gain from UDP; Majority: 483 (22.57%) +22.56	Remijio Montejo	PUP	1,290	60.28	+10.58
1998 general election Electorate: 2,479; Turnout: 2,140 (86.33%) +26.67	PUP gain from UDP; Majority: 483 (22.57%) +22.56	Faith Babb	UDP	807	37.71	−12.09
1998 general election Electorate: 2,479; Turnout: 2,140 (86.33%) +26.67	PUP gain from UDP; Majority: 483 (22.57%) +22.56	Leigh Harrison "Gerilee" Flowers	NABR	19	0.89	-
1998 general election Electorate: 2,479; Turnout: 2,140 (86.33%) +26.67	PUP gain from UDP; Majority: 483 (22.57%) +22.56	Enrique Silva	PDP	13	0.61	-
1993 general election Electorate: 3,203; Turnout: 1,911 (59.66%) +10.46	UDP gain from PUP; Majority: 1 (0.1%) −17.2	Faith Babb	UDP	951	49.8	+8.9
1993 general election Electorate: 3,203; Turnout: 1,911 (59.66%) +10.46	UDP gain from PUP; Majority: 1 (0.1%) −17.2	Remijio Montejo	PUP	950	49.7	−8.5
1993 general election Electorate: 3,203; Turnout: 1,911 (59.66%) +10.46	UDP gain from PUP; Majority: 1 (0.1%) −17.2	Hugh Meighan	Independent	10	0.5	-
1989 general election Electorate: 2,656; Turnout: 1,616 (49.2%) −15.53	PUP gain from UDP; Majority: 279 (17.3%) +9.6	Remijio Montejo	PUP	940	58.2	+13.0
1989 general election Electorate: 2,656; Turnout: 1,616 (49.2%) −15.53	PUP gain from UDP; Majority: 279 (17.3%) +9.6	Frank Lizama	UDP	661	40.9	−12.0
1984 general election Electorate: 2,112; Turnout: 1,367 (64.73%) −21.44	UDP gain from PUP; Majority: 7.7% (+2.7)	Frank Lizama	UDP		52.9	+5.9
1984 general election Electorate: 2,112; Turnout: 1,367 (64.73%) −21.44	UDP gain from PUP; Majority: 7.7% (+2.7)	Remijio Montejo	PUP		45.2	−6.8
1979 general election Electorate: 5,293; Turnout: 4,561 (86.17%) +24.69	PUP hold Majority: 5.0% (+5.0)	Vernon Courtenay	PUP		52.0	+5.2
1979 general election Electorate: 5,293; Turnout: 4,561 (86.17%) +24.69	PUP hold Majority: 5.0% (+5.0)	Kenneth Tillett	UDP		47.0	+0.2
1974 general election Electorate: 3,502; Turnout: 2,153 (61.48%) −13.01	PUP hold Majority: <0.1% (−2.5)	Vernon Courtenay	PUP		46.8	−3.7
1974 general election Electorate: 3,502; Turnout: 2,153 (61.48%) −13.01	PUP hold Majority: <0.1% (−2.5)	Kenneth Tillett	UDP		46.8	-
1974 general election Electorate: 3,502; Turnout: 2,153 (61.48%) −13.01	PUP hold Majority: <0.1% (−2.5)	Evan X Hyde	UBAD		4.1	-
1969 general election Electorate: 3,359; Turnout: 2,502 (74.49%) +5.14	PUP hold Majority: 2.5% (+1.8)	Vernon Courtenay	PUP		50.5	+1.0
1969 general election Electorate: 3,359; Turnout: 2,502 (74.49%) +5.14	PUP hold Majority: 2.5% (+1.8)	Edward Flowers	NIP		48.0	−0.8
1965 general election Electorate: 3,850; Turnout: 2,670 (69.35%) −10.77	PUP hold Majority: 0.7% (0)	Albert Cattouse	PUP		49.5	+4.9
1965 general election Electorate: 3,850; Turnout: 2,670 (69.35%) −10.77	PUP hold Majority: 0.7% (0)	Edward Flowers	NIP		48.8	+4.9
1961 general election Electorate: 2,706; Turnout: 2,168 (80.12%) n/a	PUP win Majority: 0.7% (n/a)	Albert Cattouse	PUP		44.6	-
1961 general election Electorate: 2,706; Turnout: 2,168 (80.12%) n/a	PUP win Majority: 0.7% (n/a)	Edward Flowers	NIP		43.9	-
1961 general election Electorate: 2,706; Turnout: 2,168 (80.12%) n/a	PUP win Majority: 0.7% (n/a)	Mervin Hulse	CDP		9.3	-
