= Patrick Faber (politician) =

Belizean politician

The Honourable Patrick Faber
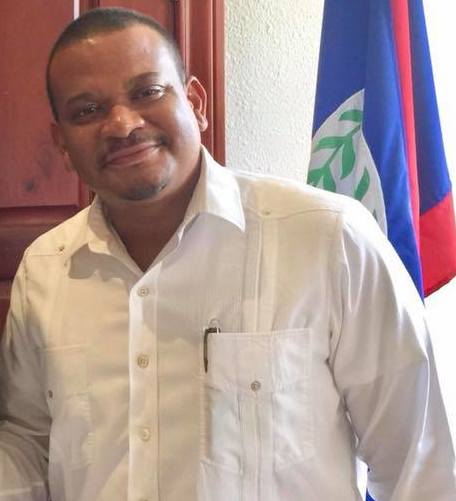

Leader of the Opposition
- In office 16 September 2021 – 1 February 2022
- Prime Minister: Johnny Briceño
- Deputy: Hugo Patt
- Preceded by: Shyne Barrow
- In office 12 November 2020 – 25 June 2021
- Prime Minister: Johnny Briceño
- Preceded by: Johnny Briceño
- Succeeded by: Shyne Barrow

Member of the Belize House of Representatives for Collet
- Incumbent
- Assumed office 5 March 2003
- Preceded by: Remijio Montejo

Personal details
- Born: Patrick Jason Faber; 21 March 1978 (age 48) Belize City, Belize (British Honduras), British Empire
- Party: United Democratic Party
- Children: Krischnxn, Patrick Faber Jr., Amani Faber
- Education: Valdosta State University; University of North Florida

Patrick Jason Faber (born 21 March 1978) is a Belizean politician. He was the leader of the Opposition. He formerly served as the minister of Education, Youth Sports and Culture. In July 2020 he was appointed the leader of the United Democratic Party, after Prime Minister Dean Barrow stated his plans to retire at the end of his term.

== Early life and education ==
Faber was born in Belize City, Belize. He received a Bachelor of Arts in Economics in 1998 from Valdosta State University in Valdosta, Georgia, as well as a Master's in Educational Leadership from the University of North Florida in 2003. He is currently working on a Doctor of Public Administration degree from Valdosta State University.

== Political career ==
Faber has been a member of the United Democratic Party of Belize since he worked as a street campaigner at the age of 14. He has since served as youth director, member of the party's central executive, and candidate for the Belize City Council. In 2010, at the National Convention of the United Democratic Party, he was elected overwhelmingly to the role of Party Chairman.

Faber is currently one of the youngest members of the Belizean House of Representatives. According to Belizean media, public confidence in Faber, the Ministry of Education and its restructuring has been positive. Consequently, Sir Colville Young, the Governor General of Belize, entrusted Faber with also running the Ministry of Youth. Faber has even served occasionally as acting prime minister, being responsible for running the affairs of state when the Prime Minister and Deputy Prime Minister are out of the country.

Despite recent political difficulties, Faber will stand as a candidate for UDP party leader in a leadership convention set for 9 February 2020 to succeed the retiring Barrow. His opponent will be Minister of National Security, John Saldivar who is eyeing for the same position as him.

On the other hand, Former Deputy Prime Minister, Gaspar Vega has publicly indicated he would return to Politics. He will contest for UDP Deputy Leader to succeed Faber, along with Minister of Health, Pablo Marin who is eyeing for the same position as him.

Faber previously went against Saldivar in 2010 for Chairman of the UDP and 2016 for first Deputy Leader, winning both times.

In July 2020, Faber was appointed as Leader of the UDP after Prime Minister Dean Barrow stated his plans to retire. In the November General Elections, his party suffered one of the largest losses in its history, losing 14 seats from 19 down to only 5.

== Personal life ==
Faber has a Fiance and has three sons and one daughter, Krischnxn (2005), Patrick Jr (2008), Amani (2018) and Phoenix (2023). On 17 November 2017, Faber was a passenger in a Cessna 208B Grand Caravan aircraft of Tropic Air which struck a vehicle shortly after take-off from Placencia Airport for Punta Gorda Airport and subsequently ditched in the sea. All seven people on board survived.
