= San Jose Succotz =

- Location within Belize
- Coordinates: 17.0849°N 89.1299°W
- Country: Belize
- District: Cayo District
- Constituency: Cayo West

Population (2010)
  - Total: 2,322
- Time zone: UTC-6 (Central)

San Jose Succotz

San Jose Succotz is a Maya village in Cayo District, Belize, consisting mainly of people of Yucatec Maya descent. According to the 2010 census, it has a population of 2,322 people in 472 households. San Jose Succotz was founded in the 1860s and mostly settled by refugees of the Caste War of Yucatán.
