= Misuse of Drugs Act =

Misuse of Drugs Act may refer to:

- Misuse of Drugs Act 1971 (c. 38) in the United Kingdom
- Misuse of Drugs Act 1975 in New Zealand
- Misuse of Drugs Act 1977 in Ireland
- Misuse of Drugs Act (Belize) (1990)
- Misuse of Drugs Act (Singapore) (1973)

== See also ==
- Controlled Substances Act
