= Faith Babb =

Belizean politician

Faith L. Babb OBE was a member of the House of Representatives of Belize representing Collet from 1993 to 1998, for the United Democratic Party. She was Deputy Speaker of the House of Representatives and Minister of State of Youth Development and Human Resources during this period.

She was appointed as a JP in 1980. She was an executive member of the National Women's Commission which brought about the creation of a women's department in the government, replacing the previous women's bureau. When she was elected in Collet in 1993 it was with a majority of just one vote: 951 to 950, with 10 votes for an independent candidate and 3 rejected ballots.

In 2010 she was honoured with the Order of Distinction.

She was appointed OBE in the 2020 New Year Honours "For services to the Community to Politics and to Womens development".
