= Orange Walk North =

Electoral constituency in Belize

- Constituency for the Belize House of Representatives
- District: Orange Walk

Current constituency

Orange Walk North is an electoral constituency in the Orange Walk District represented in the House of Representatives of the National Assembly of Belize.

== Area representatives ==
Election	Area representative	Party
1961	Victor Orellana	PUP
1965	Elito Urbina	PUP
1969	Elito Urbina	PUP
1974	Elijio Briceño	PUP
1979	Elijio Briceño	PUP
1984	Ruben Campos	UDP
1989	Ruben Campos	UDP
1993	Elito Urbina	UDP
1998	Servulo Baeza	PUP
2003	Servulo Baeza	PUP
2008	Gaspar Vega	UDP
2012	Gaspar Vega	UDP
2015	Gaspar Vega	UDP
2020	Ramon Cervantes	PUP
2025	Ramon Cervantes	PUP

== Elections ==
Election	Political result	Candidate	Party	Votes	%	±%
2025 general election Electorate: 8,534; Turnout: 5,904 (69.18%) −17.44	PUP hold Majority: 1,859 (31.48%) +10.45	Ramon Cervantes	PUP	3,829	64.85	+4.76
2025 general election Electorate: 8,534; Turnout: 5,904 (69.18%) −17.44	PUP hold Majority: 1,859 (31.48%) +10.45	Carlos Grabiel Zetina	UDP	1,970	33.37	−10.43
