= Carla Barnett =

Belizean economist and politician

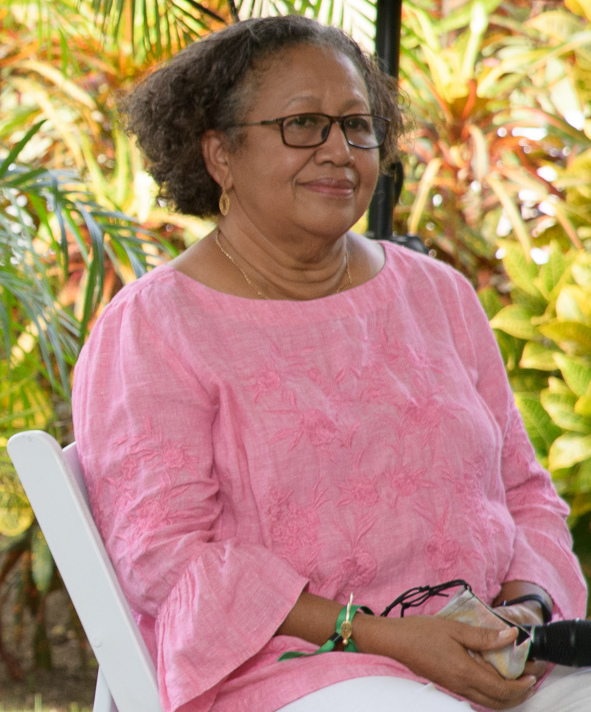
- Barnett in 2021

Secretary-General of the Caribbean Community
- Incumbent
- Assumed office 15 August 2021
- Preceded by: Irwin LaRocque

Personal details
- Born: 16 February 1958 (age 67) Belize City, Belize

Carla Natalie Barnett (born 16 February 1958) is a Belizean economist and politician, currently serving as Secretary-General of the Caribbean Community (CARICOM) since 2021.

Barnett is a former Deputy Speaker of the Senate and has held various ministerial positions in her country's government. She succeeds Irwin LaRocque, who served as Secretary-General from 2011 to 2021.

== Early life and education ==
Barnett was born on 16 February 1958 in Belize City, Belize. She earned a Bachelor of Science in economics from the University of the West Indies (UWI) and a Master of Science in economics from the University of Western Ontario in Canada. In 1990 she received her doctorate in social sciences from the UWI Mona Campus in Jamaica.

== Economic career ==
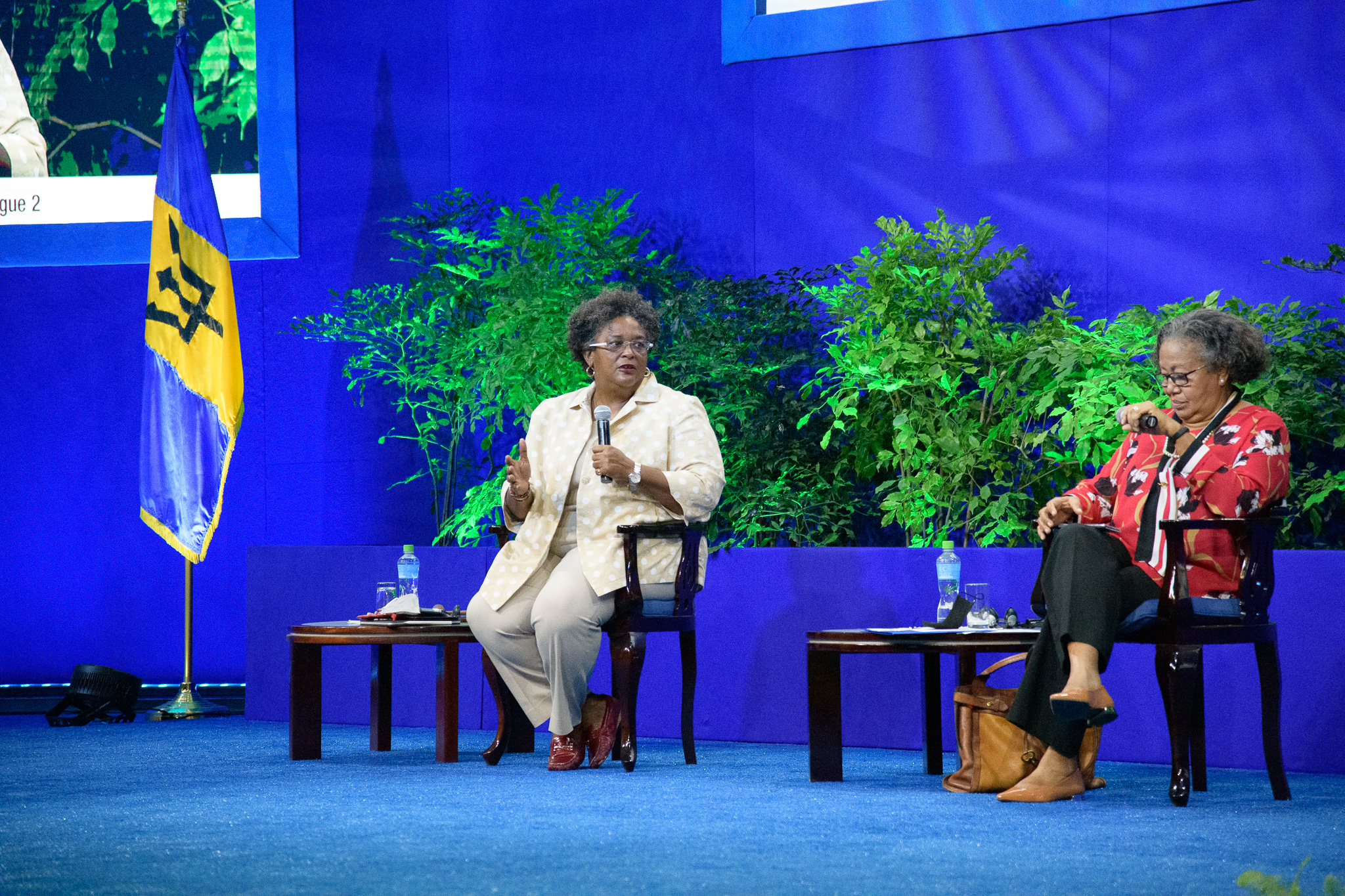
Carla Barnett with PM Mia Mottley at UNCTAD XV- World Leaders Summit in 2021

From 1989 to 1990, Barnett was an economist at the Caribbean Development Bank. She was appointed Deputy Governor of the Central Bank of Belize in 1991, the first woman to do so; she held the position until 1996. In 1997, again as the first woman and the youngest person ever, she assumed the position of Deputy Secretary General of CARICOM. From 2004 to 2007, she was Belize's first Treasury Secretary. In 2012, Barnett worked again at the Caribbean Development Bank, where she was responsible for operations in a managerial position. She resigned from this position in 2014.

== Political career ==
As a candidate for the United Democratic Party (UDP), Barnett first ran for a seat in the House of Representatives in the Freetown constituency in 2015, but lost to opposition leader Francis Fonseca. Nevertheless, she was appointed Vice President of Senate by Prime Minister Dean Barrow. On 30 August 2016, she became Minister of State for Finance and on 10 August 2017, she also took over the department for Natural Resources. As part of a cabinet reshuffle on 12 June 2018, she had to give up the powerful department for natural resources and instead took over the less important departments for labour, local administration and rural development.

== Diplomatic career ==
As a consultant, Barnett has worked for a number of multilateral and bilateral organizations in the CARICOM region, including the Inter-American Development Bank, the Canadian International Development Agency (now Global Affairs Canada), the UK Department for International Development and the United Nations Development Programme.

In May 2021, Barnett was unanimously appointed Secretary-General by the heads of government of the Caribbean Community, the first woman to do so. She officially took office on 16 August 2021.

== Views and other work ==
Barnett is a longtime advocate for gender equality "not only because it's the right thing to do to create a more stable and just society, but also because implementing equality means good economic policies." She is a member of the Caribbean Institute of Women in Leadership (CIWiL)[13] and was formerly President of the YWCA in Belize.

== Awards ==
- Commander of the Order of the British Empire (2005)
