= Misuse of Drugs Act (Belize) =

The Misuse of Drugs Act is a national drug control law of Belize. "Like the Misuse of Drugs Acts of other nations, this statute is designed to implement the provisions of the Single Convention on Narcotic Drugs and its supplementary drug control treaties."

The act deals with "dangerous or otherwise harmful drugs" and provides for the forfeiture of the proceeds of drug trafficking. It encompasses the importation/exportation, production and supply, and possession of controlled drugs, as well as the cultivation of cannabis, opium poppy and coca plants. It divides these drugs into three classes—A, B, and C—though it makes no provision for a drug to be added to or removed from a class or for its transfer to a different class. A person found to have "more than 2 grams of heroine, 1 gram of cocaine, 30 grams of opium, 3 grams of morphine, or 60 grams of cannabis will be deemed complicit in drug trafficking." It also mandates the establishment of a National Drug Abuse Control Council of Belize.

The Misuse of Drugs Act No. 22 of November 12, 1990, repealed Dangerous Drugs Act, Chapter 87 of the Laws of Belize, 1980. It has been amended several times, by Criminal Justice Act No. 26 of December 14, 1992, Criminal Justice Act No. 6 of May 30, 1994, and Law Reform Miscellaneous Provisions Act No. of 1998. The 1992 act dictates mandatory sentences for drug trafficking. The 1994 act strengthens the forfeiture provisions for trafficking. The 1998 act allows for higher fines for summary trafficking convictions.

== See also ==
- Politics of Belize
