= Vernon Harrison Courtenay =

Belizean politician

Minister of Foreign Affairs of Belize
- In office 1983–1984
- Preceded by: George Cadle Price
- Succeeded by: Dean Barrow

Personal details
- Born: Vernon Harrison Courtenay; 1932
- Died: 15 August 2009
- Political party: People's United Party
- Children: Eamon Courtenay

Vernon Harrison Courtenay (1932 – 15 August 2009) was a Belizean lawyer and politician who served as Minister of Foreign Affairs from 1983 to 1984.

== Family ==
His son Eamon Courtenay also served as Minister of Foreign Affairs.
