= Ministry of Foreign Affairs (Belize) =

Government ministry of Belize

Agency overview
- Formed: 1981; 45 years ago
- Type: Executive department
- Jurisdiction: Government of Belize
- Headquarters: Leigh Richardson Building, Belmopan, Belize
- Minister responsible: Hon. Francis Fonseca
- Agency executive: H. E. Amalia Mai, Chief Executive Officer
- Parent department: Ministry of Foreign Affairs, Foreign Trade and Immigration
- Website: www.mfa.gov.bz

The Ministry of Foreign Affairs of Belize is the government ministry of Belize which oversees foreign relations of the country.

== List of ministers ==
This is a list of ministers of foreign affairs of Belize:

- George Cadle Price, 1981–1983
- Vernon Harrison Courtenay, 1983–1984
- Dean Barrow, 1984–1989
- Said Musa, 1989–1993
- Dean Barrow, 1993–1998
- Said Musa, 1998–2002
- Assad Shoman, 2002–2003
- Godfrey Smith, 2003–2006
- Eamon Courtenay, 2006–2007
- Lisa Shoman, 2007–2008
- Wilfred Elrington, 2008–2020
- Eamon Courtenay, 2020–2023
- Francis Fonseca, 2024–present

== See also ==
- Cabinet of Belize
- List of prime ministers of Belize
