= Lisel Alamilla =

Belizean politician

- Born: September 5, 1967 (age 58); Belize City, Belize
- Occupations: conservationist; politician

Lisel Alamilla is a conservationist and politician from Belize. In 2012, Alamilla was appointed as a senator and member of the Belize Cabinet as Minister of Forestry, Fisheries & Sustainable Development. She served until 2015. Alamilla won the 2012 Whitley Award for Inspirational Conservational Leadership.

== Early life and education ==
Lisel Alamilla was born in Belize City on September 5, 1967 to parents Maclovio Alamilla and Rose Magda Alamilla. She has four siblings: Luis, Giovanni, Tania and Eder++. As a child she lived in Belize City and Benque Viejo del Carmen. Alamilla earned a master's degree in Conservation Social Science from the University of Idaho College of Natural Resources in 1995 and a bachelor's degree in 1993 from Northeastern Illinois University. She is a graduate from Saint John's Junior College and Saint Catherine's Academy, an all girls high school.

Lisel Alamilla was the executive director of the Ya’axché Conservation Trust from 2008 until 2012, where she worked to protect the Mayan Golden Landscape in southern Belize. Prior to her job at Ya’axché, Alamilla worked at Fauna and Flora International as Country Director for Belize. In 2012, Alamilla won the Whitley Award for Inspirational Conservational Leadership from the Whitney Fund for Nature.

== Political career ==
In 2012, Alamilla was appointed as a senator and member of the Belize Cabinet as Minister of Forestry, Fisheries & Sustainable Development by Prime Minister, Dean Barrow. With new appointments by Barrow in November 2015, Alamilla is no longer a senator or Belize Cabinet Minister.

In November 2015 Alamilla was appointed to establish and Chair the Toledo Maya Land Rights Commission which is tasked to implement in consultation with the Maya people or their representative the Consent Order, which aims to develop the legislative, administrative and governance framework to recognize Maya customary land tenure is the Toledo District, Belize.
