= Queen's Square (Belize House constituency) =

- Constituency for the Belize House of Representatives
- District: Belize
- Electorate: 4,278 (2015)
- Major settlements: Belize City (part)

Current constituency
- Created: 1984
- Party: United Democratic Party
- Area Representative: Godwin Haylock

Queen's Square is an electoral constituency in the Belize District represented in the House of Representatives of the National Assembly of Belize since 2025 by Hon . Godwin Haylock of the United Democratic Party.

== Profile ==
The Queen's Square constituency was one of 10 new seats created for the 1984 general election. It occupies a southern portion of central Belize City, bordering the Collet, Mesopotamia and Port Loyola constituencies. A UDP stronghold, Queen's Square is the only constituency in the Belize District which has never been won by the People's United Party.

== Area representatives ==
Election	Area representative	Party
1984	Dean Barrow	UDP
1989	Dean Barrow	UDP
1993	Dean Barrow	UDP
1998	Dean Barrow	UDP
2003	Dean Barrow	UDP
2008	Dean Barrow	UDP
2012	Dean Barrow	UDP
2015	Dean Barrow	UDP
2020	Denise Barrow	UDP
2025	Godwin Haylock	UDP

== Elections ==
Election	Political result	Candidate	Party	Votes	%	±%
2025 general election Electorate: 2,824; Turnout: 2,026 (89.57 71.74%) −17.83	UDP hold Majority: 430 (12.86 21.23%) +8.37	Godwin Haylock	UDP	1,192	58.84	+2.41
2025 general election Electorate: 2,824; Turnout: 2,026 (89.57 71.74%) −17.83	UDP hold Majority: 430 (12.86 21.23%) +8.37	Lorna Marie McKay	PUP	687	42.61 33.91	−8.70
2025 general election Electorate: 2,824; Turnout: 2,026 (89.57 71.74%) −17.83	UDP hold Majority: 430 (12.86 21.23%) +8.37	Shane Devon Williams	UDP	1,234	3.26	-53.17
2025 general election Electorate: 2,824; Turnout: 2,026 (89.57 71.74%) −17.83	UDP hold Majority: 430 (12.86 21.23%) +8.37	Garry Matus	People's Democratic Movement (Belize)	9	0.44	-
2020 general election Electorate: 2,714; Turnout: 2,431 (89.57%) +22.83	UDP hold Majority: 308 (12.86%) -46.02	Denise Barrow	UDP	1,351	56.43	-21.96
2020 general election Electorate: 2,714; Turnout: 2,431 (89.57%) +22.83	UDP hold Majority: 308 (12.86%) -46.02	Allan Pollard	PUP	1,020	42.61	+25.45
2020 general election Electorate: 2,714; Turnout: 2,431 (89.57%) +22.83	UDP hold Majority: 308 (12.86%) -46.02	Garry Matus	BPP	23	0.96	-1.39
2015 general election Electorate: 4,278; Turnout: 2,855 (66.74%) +1.66	UDP hold Majority: 1,681 (58.88%) -1.23	Dean Barrow	UDP	2,238	78.39	-0.73
2015 general election Electorate: 4,278; Turnout: 2,855 (66.74%) +1.66	UDP hold Majority: 1,681 (58.88%) -1.23	Anthony Glenford Sylvestre	PUP	490	17.16	−1.85
2015 general election Electorate: 4,278; Turnout: 2,855 (66.74%) +1.66	UDP hold Majority: 1,681 (58.88%) -1.23	Garry Matus	BPP	67	2.35	-
2012 general election Electorate: 3,960; Turnout: 2,577 (65.08%) −3.94	UDP hold Majority: 1,549 (60.11%) +7.54	Dean Barrow	UDP	2,039	79.12	+3.02
2012 general election Electorate: 3,960; Turnout: 2,577 (65.08%) −3.94	UDP hold Majority: 1,549 (60.11%) +7.54	Anthony Glenford Sylvestre	PUP	490	19.01	−4.52
2008 general election Electorate: 3,977; Turnout: 2,745 (69.02%) −11.76	UDP hold Majority: 1,443 (52.57%) +41.07	Dean Barrow	UDP	2,089	76.10	+20.74
2008 general election Electorate: 3,977; Turnout: 2,745 (69.02%) −11.76	UDP hold Majority: 1,443 (52.57%) +41.07	Anthony Sylvestre Jr.	PUP	646	23.53	−20.33
2008 general election Electorate: 3,977; Turnout: 2,745 (69.02%) −11.76	UDP hold Majority: 1,443 (52.57%) +41.07	Ebony Babb	NRTCP	10	0.36	-
2003 general election Electorate: 2,690; Turnout: 2,173 (80.78%) −9.4	UDP hold Majority: 250 (11.5%) +8.76	Dean Barrow	UDP	1,203	55.36	+4.57
2003 general election Electorate: 2,690; Turnout: 2,173 (80.78%) −9.4	UDP hold Majority: 250 (11.5%) +8.76	Richard Bradley	PUP	953	43.86	−4.19
1998 general election Electorate: 1,904; Turnout: 1,717 (90.18%) +32.61	UDP hold Majority: 47 (2.74%) −34.46	Dean Barrow	UDP	872	50.79	−17.81
1998 general election Electorate: 1,904; Turnout: 1,717 (90.18%) +32.61	UDP hold Majority: 47 (2.74%) −34.46	Richard Bradley	PUP	825	48.05	+16.65
1998 general election Electorate: 1,904; Turnout: 1,717 (90.18%) +32.61	UDP hold Majority: 47 (2.74%) −34.46	Russell August	PDP	9	0.52	-
1993 general election Electorate: 2,943; Turnout: 1,694 (57.57%) −1.03	UDP hold Majority: 630 (37.2%) +7.9	Dean Barrow	UDP	1,162	68.6	+4.7
1993 general election Electorate: 2,943; Turnout: 1,694 (57.57%) −1.03	UDP hold Majority: 630 (37.2%) +7.9	Juliet Soberanis	PUP	532	31.4	−3.2
1989 general election Electorate: 2,896; Turnout: 1,697 (58.6%) −7.16	UDP hold Majority: 497 (29.3%) −4.9	Dean Barrow	UDP	1,085	63.9	−2.6
1989 general election Electorate: 2,896; Turnout: 1,697 (58.6%) −7.16	UDP hold Majority: 497 (29.3%) −4.9	Thomas Greenwood	PUP	588	34.6	+2.3
1984 general election Electorate: 2,544; Turnout: 1,673 (65.76%) n/a	UDP win Majority: 580 (34.2%) n/a	Dean Barrow	UDP	1,029	66.5	-
1984 general election Electorate: 2,544; Turnout: 1,673 (65.76%) n/a	UDP win Majority: 580 (34.2%) n/a	Ralph Fonseca	PUP	449	32.3	-

National Assembly of Belize
Preceded by Fort George	Constituency represented by the leader of the opposition 1998–2008	Succeeded by Fort George
Preceded by Fort George	Constituency represented by the prime minister 2008–present	Succeeded by incumbent
