= Nan Alamilla Boyd =

American historian

Nan Alamilla Boyd is an American historian and scholar of gender, sexuality, and urban space, known for her work on LGBTQ histories in San Francisco and queer oral history methodology. She is professor emeritus in the Department of Women & Gender Studies (WGS) at San Francisco State University.

She is an oral historian at the Oral History Center at the Bancroft Library at the University of California, Berkeley. Her seminal book, Wide Open Town: A History of Queer San Francisco to 1965, charts the rise of gay and lesbian politics in San Francisco.

== Biography ==
Boyd earned her B.A. in history from the University of California, Berkeley. She completed her M.A. and Ph.D. in American civilization at Brown University, finishing her doctoral studies in 1995.

Prior to her tenure at San Francisco State University, Boyd taught in the Women's and Gender Studies Department at Sonoma State University from 2003 to 2007. She was previously the first departmental line in the Women's Studies Department at the University of Colorado Boulder, where she received tenure in 2003. At CU Boulder, she helped found and served as program director from 1997 to 1999 of a new interdisciplinary program in LGBT Studies (now Queer and Trans Studies).

Her earlier career includes positions at the University of California at Santa Barbara, Stanford University, and the City University of New York Graduate Center, where she held fellowships and visiting scholar roles.

At San Francisco State University (SFSU), she has taught in the Department of Women & Gender Studies since 2007 and held the rank of professor. She is now professor emeritus at SFSU. At SFSU, Boyd served in administrative and leadership roles, including as chair of the Department of Women's & Gender Studies.

She founded the GLBT Historical Society's oral history project in the 1990s, served on the organization's Archives Committee and Board of Directors, and has contributed as a volunteer and public scholar.

Her research materials from the Wide Open Town project are housed in the GLBT Historical Society archives.

== Research and scholarly works ==
Boyd's research focuses on the intersections of sexuality, urban space, queer community formation, and the political economy of tourism. Her work also addresses themes of queer visibility, identity formation, and community activism.

In her book, Wide Open Town: A History of Queer San Francisco to 1965 (2003), Boyd combines oral interviews, archival records, and mapping of queer bar districts in San Francisco from the late 19th century through 1965 to demonstrate how the city has functioned as a space for gay and lesbian life.

In 2012, Boyd co-edited Bodies of Evidence: The Practice of Queer Oral History, which addresses methodological approaches to oral history within queer contexts and emphasizes themes of memory, testimony, and the ethics of representation.

In her later research, Boyd examines the commodification of race, gender, and urban space in San Francisco, with particular attention to the ways in which queer tourism, gentrification, and urban redevelopment reshape both social identity and the urban landscape. Her scholarship addresses the social and economic consequences of queer visibility, the politics of spatial organization and mobility, and historical processes.

Among her other publications are "San Francisco's Castro District: From Gay Liberation to Tourist Destination" (Journal of Tourism and Cultural Change, 2011) and "Who is the Subject? Queer Theory Meets Oral History" (Journal of the History of Sexuality, 2008).
