= Rossana Briceño =

First Lady of Belize, politician

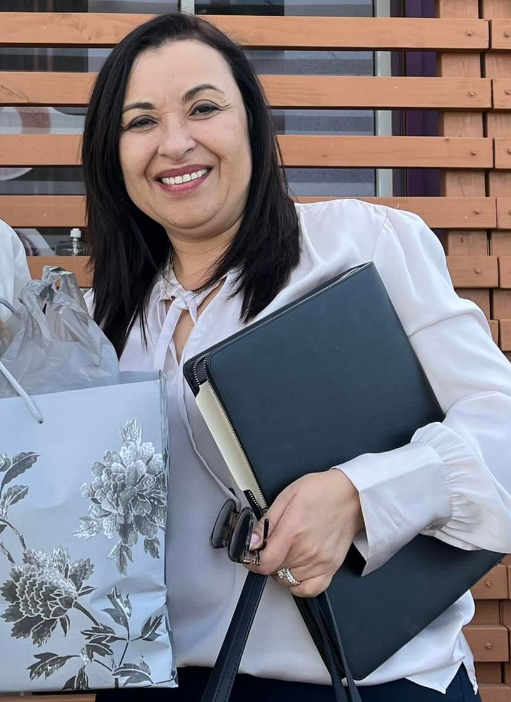
- Born: Rossana Maria Briceño; 26 July 1968 (age 58); Orange Walk Town, Belize
- Education: Master Degree in Educational Leadership from the University of North Florida
- Occupations: Spouse of the Prime Minister of Belize, Special Envoy of Belize for the Development of Families and Children
- Years active: 2020–present
- Spouse: Johnny Briceño (m. 1987)
- Children: 3
- Website: https://specialenvoyofbelize.com/

Rossana Maria Briceño (born 26 July 1968) is the spouse of the prime minister of Belize Hon. John Briceño. She is the special envoy of Belize for the development of families and children.

== Early life and education ==
Rossana Maria Briceño was born on July 26, 1968, in the vibrant town of Orange Walk, Belize. She holds a bachelor's degree in special education from Northeastern Illinois University (NEIU) and a master's degree in educational leadership from the University of North Florida. In 2018, she furthered her education by completing a specialized program at Houston Baptist University, focusing on diagnostics assessment and curriculum development at the master's level.

== Personal life ==
Rossana Briceño has been married to the current prime minister of Belize, Hon. John Briceño, since November 9, 1987. The couple has three children named Daniel, John, and Andre and a granddaughter named Celeste.

== Career in education ==
Rossana Briceño's career in education began at the Stella Maris Government School, the only school in Belize dedicated to teaching students in special education. Her passion for inclusive education was nurtured here as she worked with these remarkable students. She then spent 33 years at St. Peter’s Anglican School, where she transitioned from teacher to principal, serving in the latter role for 13 years. As principal, she oversaw the implementation of a fully functional special needs center within the school, fostering an environment of equal opportunity and growth for her students and their families.

== Role as Special Envoy of Belize ==
On January 22, 2021, Rossana Briceño stepped down as principal of St. Peter’s Anglican School to become the special envoy for the development of families and children. In this distinguished role, she advocates for vulnerable families and children, aiming to empower them to fully participate in Belize’s development.

== Former chair of SCLAN ==
Rossana Briceño served as the chair of SCLAN from 2022 to 2024 and remains as an executive member. SCLAN, a network launched by First Ladies and Spouses of the Heads of Government of the Caribbean Community (CARICOM) in 2017, addresses the region's social and human development. SCLAN has partnered with the private and public sectors, United Nations agencies, and civil society on 15 projects within CARICOM. Its aim is to advance the global strategy for women, adolescents, and girls, the "Every Woman, Every Child Initiative," and the 2030 SDG Agenda.
