= Gaspar Vega =

Belizean politician

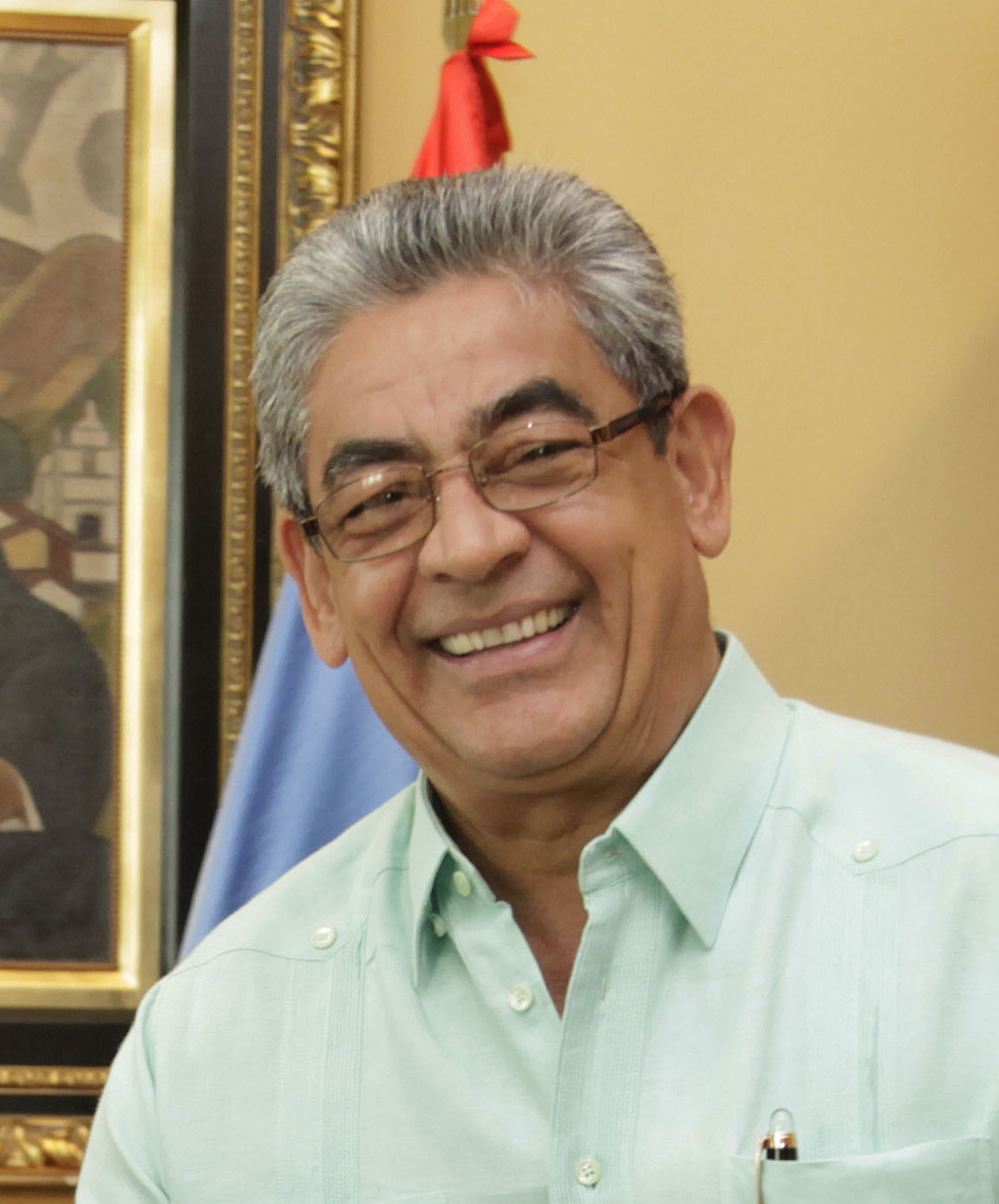
Gaspar Vega, 2015

Gaspar Vega is a Belizean politician. He was the deputy prime minister of Belize from 2008 to 2016. He held the office of minister of Natural Resources and the Environment in Belize (2008–2012). He also served as Minister of Natural Resources and Agriculture. Vega is a member of the United Democratic Party (UDP).

== Biography ==
He was the area representative for the Orange Walk North constituency until 2020. Vega is originally from San Estevan Village, Orange Walk District. As a child, Gapi, as he is known by family and friends, got his first introduction to work on the family farm. Later, he attended and graduated from Muffles College in Orange Walk Town. After spending much of his adult career working in the insurance business, in 1988, Gasper founded Vega’s Imports Ltd. – a merchandising import-distribution company. After several years, Vega’s Imports Ltd evolved into a well established and very successful family business.

Gaspar entered the political arena in 2006. In 2008 he was elected to represent the people of the Orange Walk North constituency.

== Land scandals ==
In August 2016 Belize news agencies would start to report on a land scandal involving Gaspar Vega and his son Andre Vega, which led to his resignation from the Cabinet of Belize. The land scandal involved government repossession of Andre Vega's land for resale, which would result in the government reimbursing him the lands market value of approximately $400,000 BZD. Following his resignation various other land schemes would come to light, leading to further accusations of corruption.

In 2019 the Supreme Court of Belize would rule that Andre Vega had to repay the $400,000 BZD that he had been given in compensation as part of the land scandal.

== Demonstration against corruption ==
In 2017 the leader of the opposition Johnny Briceño organized a demonstration against corruption and the demand that Vega be investigated at once. Being just planned within 3 days over a thousand residents showed up. Holding up posters of Vega in Handcuffs and others demanding that his son return $400,000 wrongly compensated money. They marched until arriving at the Central Park in the Orangewalk Town. Gaspar Vega organized a counter protest which was attended by less than 200 people who camped outside of his residence. The military of Belize separated both political parties and the NGOs by blocking the road and being on guard since the protest began near his residence.

After speeches at the Central Park John briceño led the residents to the a nearby bridge linking Belize City to Orangewalk in order to block it. The police would use tear gas to disperse the protestors, which also resulted in injury to members of the media. They would also prevent access to the toll bridge for some protestors, by stopping the buses which they were on. Following the protests the government would claim that blocking the toll bridge had constituted and illegal demonstration.

On that day Vega declared publicly that he would return into the political arena.
