= Johnny Briceño =

Prime Minister of Belize since 2020

The Honourable Johnny Briceño
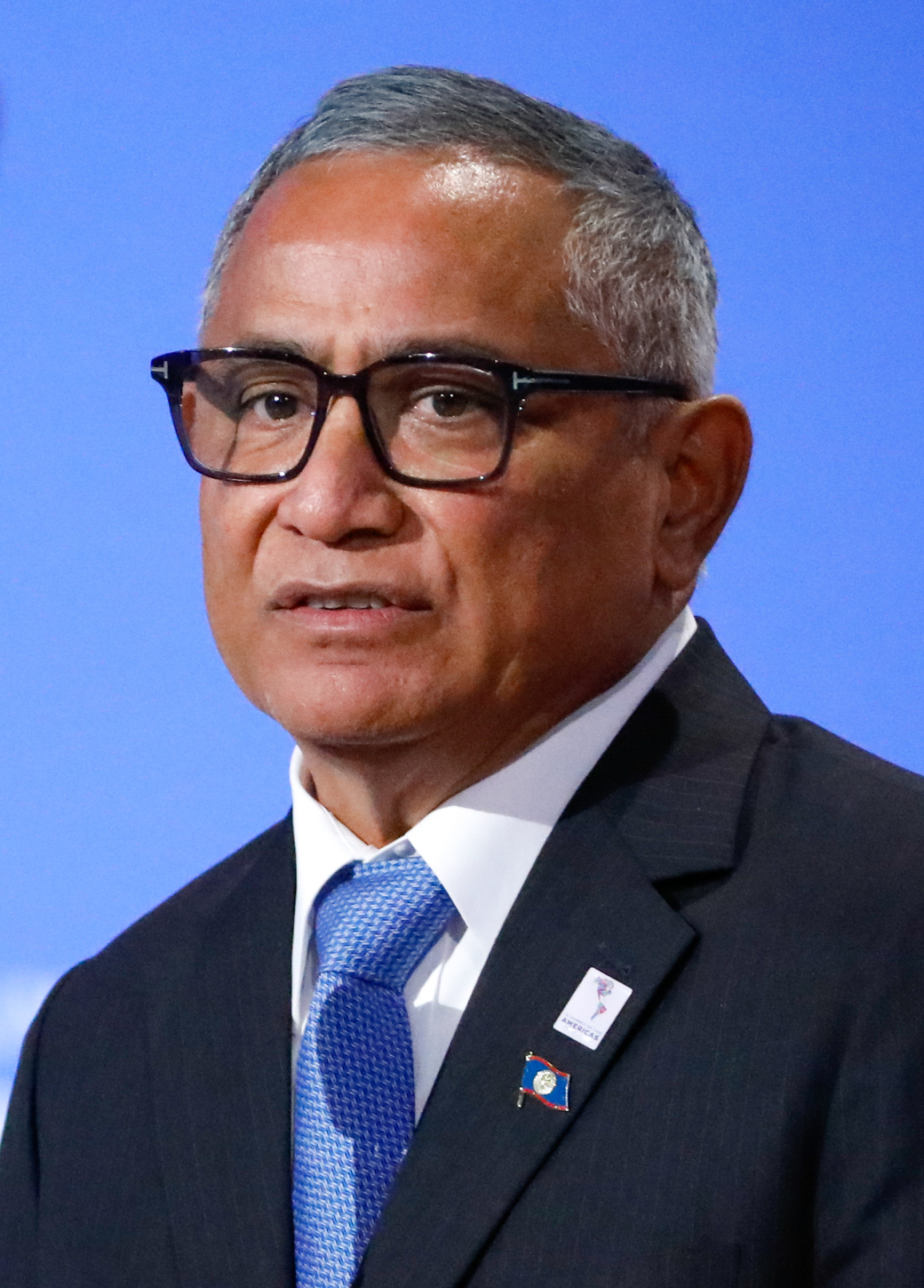
- Briceño in 2022

5th Prime Minister of Belize
- Incumbent
- Assumed office 12 November 2020
- Monarchs: Elizabeth II; Charles III
- Governors-General: Sir Colville Young; Dame Froyla Tzalam
- Deputy: Cordel Hyde
- Preceded by: Dean Barrow

Leader of the Opposition
- In office 31 January 2016 – 12 November 2020
- Prime Minister: Dean Barrow
- Preceded by: Francis Fonseca
- Succeeded by: Patrick Faber

Member of the Belize House of Representatives for Orange Walk Central
- Incumbent
- Assumed office 30 June 1993
- Preceded by: Leopold Briceño

Chairman of the Caribbean Community
- In office 1 January 2022 – 30 June 2022
- Secretary General: Carla Barnett
- Preceded by: Gaston Browne
- Succeeded by: Chan Santokhi

Personal details
- Born: John Antonio Briceño; 17 July 1960 (age 66) Orange Walk Town, British Honduras (now Belize)
- Party: People's United Party
- Spouse: Rossana Briceño
- Children: 3
- Parent: Elijio Briceño (father)
- Education: St. John's College; University of Texas at Austin

John Antonio Briceño (born 17 July 1960) is a Belizean politician who has served as the fifth and current prime minister of Belize since 2020 and the leader of the People's United Party (PUP) since 2016. He was Leader of the Opposition from 2008 to 2011 and from 2016 to 2020. From 1998 to 2007, he served as the deputy prime minister under Prime Minister Said Musa.

== Early life and education ==
Briceño was born in Orange Walk Town, British Honduras, on 17 July 1960. His father Elijio Briceño was a government minister in the 1980s, but in 1985 was convicted of conspiring to smuggle marijuana and cocaine into the United States, with the indictment naming a brother and a nephew as co-conspirators; in September 1985, his father was sentenced to seven years in prison.

Briceño graduated from Muffles College in 1978. He earned an associate degree in business administration from St. John's College in 1980, and a bachelor's degree in business administration from the University of Texas at Austin in 1985.

In 1990, Briceño and his brother Jaime founded Centaur Communications, a cable television provider which later branched out into Internet service, television news, and radio.

== Career ==
Briceño was first elected to the Belizean House of Representatives from the Orange Walk Central constituency in 1993; in 1994 he successfully ran in the town council elections of Orange Walk Town.

In 1994, Briceño was elected Co-Chairman of the People's United Party; in 1996, he was elected Deputy Party Leader. When the PUP won the 1998 elections, Briceño was appointed Deputy Prime Minister and Minister of the Natural Resources and the Environment.

In August 2004, he led a group of ministers, known as the G-7 alliance, who made a number of reform demands, including the dismissal of Ralph Fonseca from the Cabinet. When Prime Minister Said Musa failed to meet these demands, the group resigned; however, Musa subsequently agreed to all of the demands except for the dismissal of Fonseca and the G-7 ministers remained in the Cabinet. Briceño also gained an additional portfolio, the Ministry of Finance. Briceño was later one of the ministers who opposed Musa's proposal to settle the country's Universal Health Services debt; as a result of this, Musa attempted to demote Briceño from his position as Deputy Prime Minister, but Briceño refused to accept the lesser posts in the Cabinet that he was offered and instead resigned from the Cabinet on 5 June 2007.

At a national convention of the PUP in July 2007, Briceño was re-elected as one of the party's deputy leaders. In the February 2008 general election, in which the PUP was defeated, Briceño was re-elected in his constituency of Orange Walk Central; he was one of only six successful PUP candidates.

On 30 March 2008, Briceño was elected as the leader of the PUP at a party convention in Belmopan, succeeding Musa. He defeated Francis Fonseca, who was considered to be the candidate preferred by the party establishment, receiving 330 votes against 310 for Fonseca.

Citing unspecified health issues, Briceño abruptly resigned as both PUP and opposition leader in October 2011 without leading the party in a general election. He retained his seat in the National Assembly. He was succeeded in both leadership positions by Fonseca.

=== 2015 recording incident ===
In March 2015, shortly after the PUP's decisive defeat in municipal elections, a recording was made public of Briceño sharply criticizing the 1998–2008 Musa government. In the recording, Briceño accused Musa and Ralph Fonseca of stealing "millions, tens of millions of dollars", and stated, "... had this been another country they would have been in jail right now". Briceño also claimed he went deeply into debt personally as PUP leader on the party's behalf, and blamed Francis Fonseca for losing the 2012 general election and local elections. Briceño claimed the recording was made without his consent and refused to comment on it. Francis Fonseca characterized the incident as an "internal party matter".

== Prime Minister of Belize (2020–present) ==
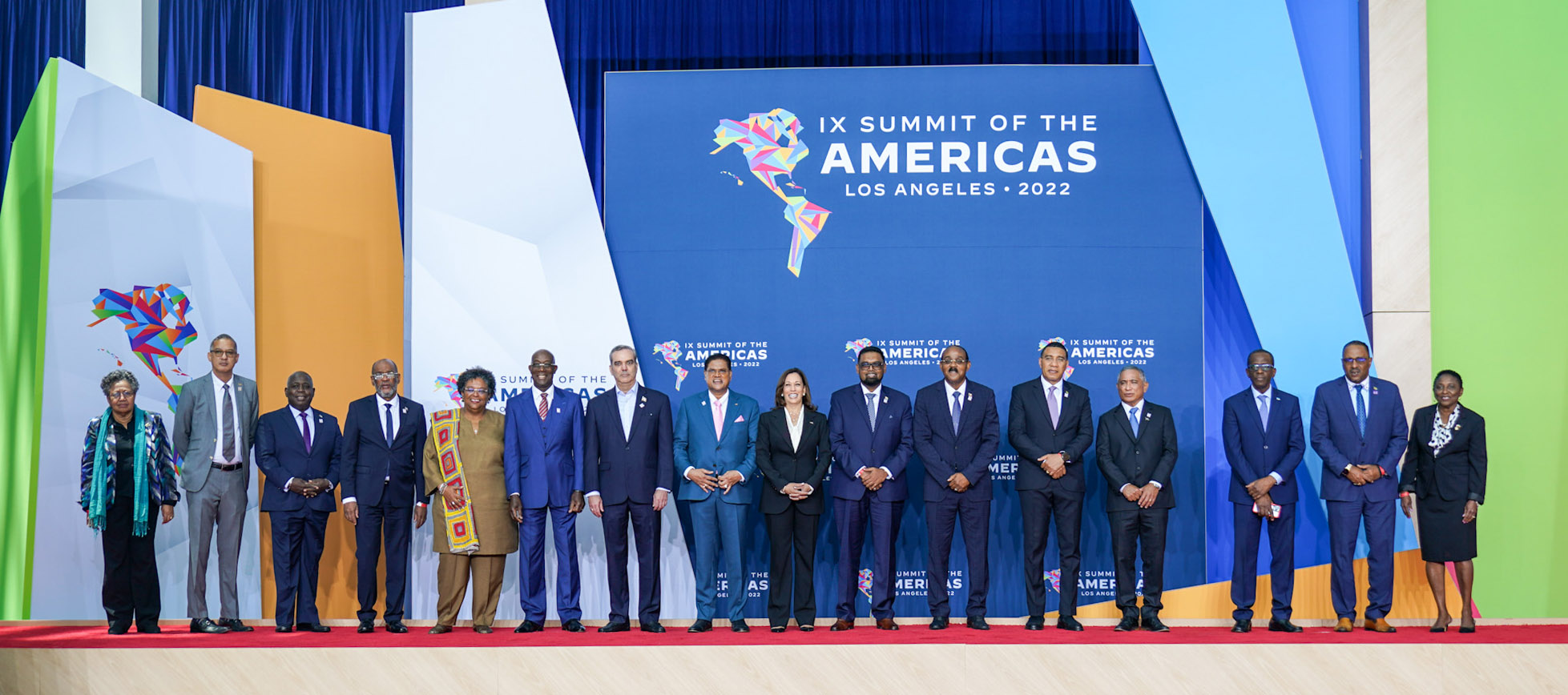
Briceño at the 2022 Americas summit in Los Angeles June 9, 2022

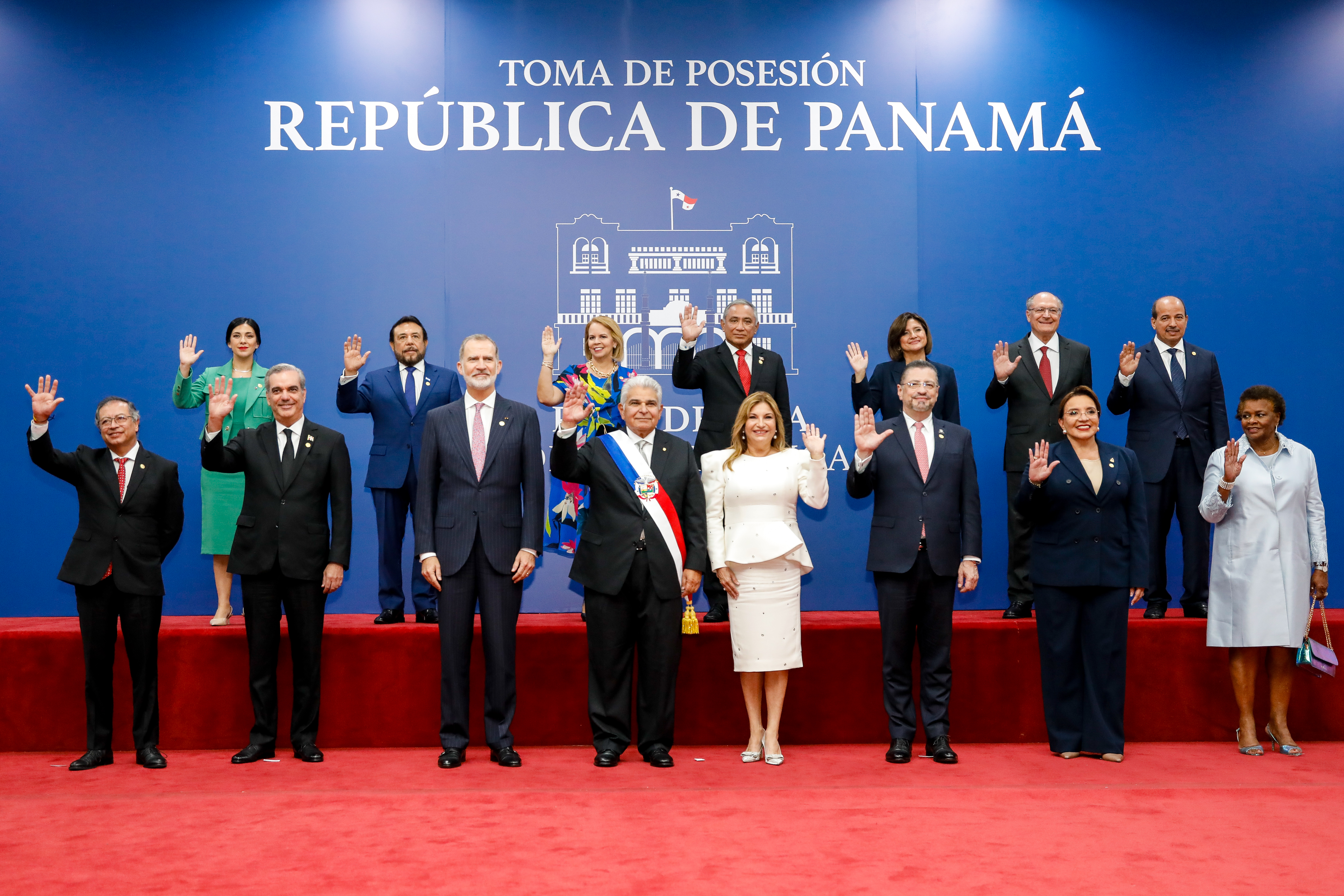
Briceño at José Raúl Mulino inauguration on July 1, 2024

In November 2020, Briceño's People's United Party won government at the 2020 general election, defeating the United Democratic Party (UDP) led by Patrick Faber. He took office as Prime Minister of Belize on 12 November 2020. He is the first prime minister who is not from Belize City.

Briceño's government passed legislation in July 2021 establishing a fixed seven-year term for the Governor-General of Belize. During the debate on the bill, he stated that Belize should begin to consider the replacement of the monarchy with a republic.

In January 2022, Briceño publicly accused the opposition UDP of involvement in drug trafficking, specifically that "the highest level of the UDP was involved in landing drug planes". In response, UDP leader Shyne Barrow accused Briceño of involvement with drug cartels himself and made reference to the conviction of Briceño's father and other family members on drug trafficking charges. Briceño subsequently sued Barrow for defamation in the Supreme Court of Belize, but the suit was dismissed in January 2023. In May 2024, Barrow made further comments describing Belize as a "narco-state", which Briceño described as "unfortunate and reckless".

In March 2025, the PUP was elected with an increased majority at the 2025 Belizean general election, with Briceño sworn in again the next day.

== Personal life ==
Briceño and his wife Rossana Briceño (a 1986 graduate of Muffles College) have three sons. On 24 November 2020, two weeks after starting his term as prime minister, he declared he was diagnosed with COVID-19 and was doing well. On 1 February 2022, it was announced that Briceño tested positive for COVID-19 again.

Briceño is of Mayan descent through his grandmother on his father’s side.

== See also ==
- List of current heads of state and government
- List of heads of the executive by approval rating

== Honours ==
- (Taiwan) : The Order of Propitious Clouds with Grand Cordon

Assembly seats
Preceded by Leopold Briceño	Member of the Belize House of Representatives for Orange Walk Central; 1993–present	Incumbent
Party political offices
Preceded by Francis Fonseca	Leader of the People's United Party; 2016–present	Incumbent
Political offices
Preceded by Francis Fonseca	Leader of the Opposition; 2016–2020	Succeeded by Patrick Faber
Preceded by Dean Barrow	Prime Minister of Belize; 2020–present	Incumbent
Diplomatic posts
Preceded by Gaston Browne	Chairman of the Caribbean Community; 2022	Succeeded by Chan Santokhi
