= Dean Barrow =

Prime Minister of Belize from 2008 to 2020

The Right Honourable Dean Barrow SC PC
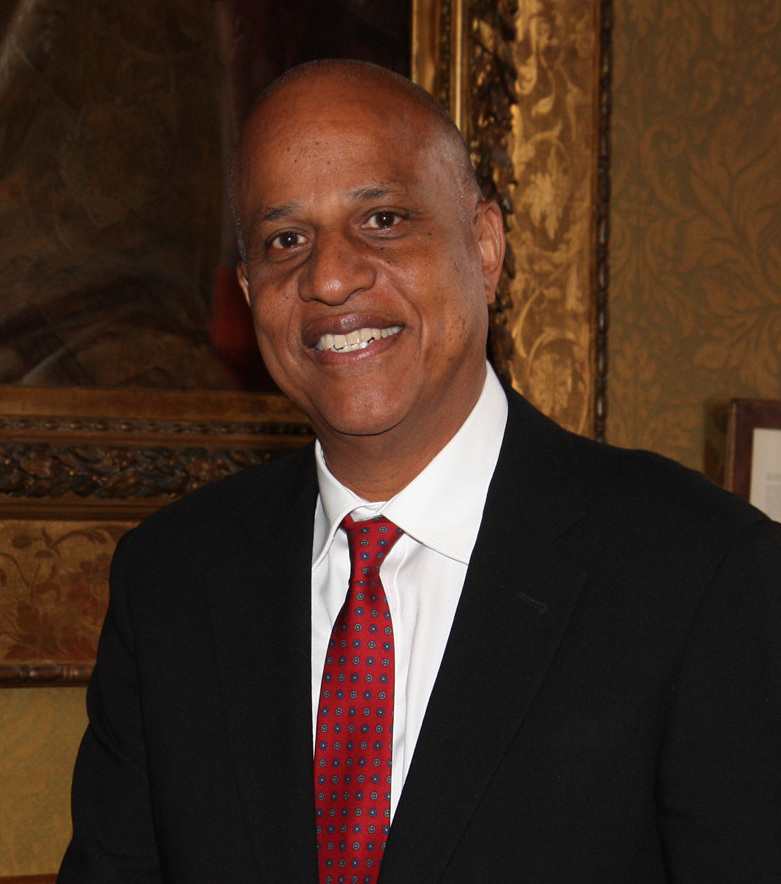
- Barrow in 2013

4th Prime Minister of Belize
- In office 8 February 2008 – 12 November 2020
- Monarch: Elizabeth II
- Governor-General: Sir Colville Young
- Deputy: Gaspar Vega (2008–2016); Patrick Faber (2016–2020); Hugo Patt (2020–2020)
- Preceded by: Said Musa
- Succeeded by: Johnny Briceño

Leader of the Opposition
- In office 30 August 1998 – 8 February 2008
- Prime Minister: Said Musa
- Preceded by: Said Musa
- Succeeded by: Johnny Briceño

Member of the Belize House of Representatives for Queen's Square
- In office 14 December 1984 – 12 November 2020
- Preceded by: Constituency established
- Succeeded by: Denise Barrow

Personal details
- Born: Dean Oliver Barrow; 2 March 1951 (age 75) Belize City, British Honduras (now Belize)
- Party: United Democratic Party (1984–present)
- Spouse(s): Lois Young (before 2009); Kim Simplis (2009–present)
- Education: University of the West Indies at Cave Hill; Norman Manley Law School; University of Miami

Dean Oliver Barrow, SC PC (born March 2, 1951) is a Belizean politician who served as the fourth prime minister of Belize from 2008 until 2020 and as leader of Belize's United Democratic Party.

An attorney by profession, Barrow served as Belize's deputy prime minister and minister of foreign affairs from 1993 to 1998 and was Leader of the Opposition from 1998 until the UDP won the February 2008 election. Barrow was elected to his first term as prime minister in 2008. He started his second term after the UDP again won an election on March 7, 2012 and his third term when the UDP won again on November 4, 2015.

== Early life and education ==
Barrow was born and raised in Belize City, British Honduras (now Belize). He is a grandson of Ebenezer Oliver Buntin Barrow, a district commissioner in British Honduras and officeholder in the National Party. He attended the University of Miami in Coral Gables, Florida, where he graduated with a degree in economics and political science.

== Legal career ==
Following his graduation from the University of Miami, Barrow returned to Belize, where he entered the legal profession in 1974, working with his maternal uncle Dean Lindo and rising to partner in Lindo's firm in 1977. He eventually left to form his own law firm, Barrow and Williams, with partner Rodwell Williams. He left the firm in 2008, but maintains the title of senior partner. Among his firm's more controversial clients was Lord Ashcroft and Ashcroft's associated businesses, including Belize Bank and Belize Telemedia Limited, formerly known as Belize Telecommunications Limited.

== Political career ==
In December 1983, Barrow entered electoral politics as a candidate in Belize City's elections for city council, which he won as part of a nine-man slate. Before that year's redistricting, in 1984 Barrow was preselected as the UDP candidate for Collet but after redistricting chose to contest the newly created Queen's Square constituency instead, as was his prerogative under UDP party rules. In the ensuing election Barrow handily defeated Ralph Fonseca of the People's United Party. Soon after he was appointed to the first Manuel Esquivel Cabinet as Attorney-General and Minister of Foreign Affairs.

In the 1989 general election, Barrow defeated Thomas Greenwood but his party lost the election. Barrow continued in his law practice. In 1990, he became deputy UDP leader under Esquivel after the death of Curl Thompson. In 1993, Barrow won his third straight general election and returned to the Cabinet in the posts he held from the previous administration in addition to Minister of National Security. His detractors called him "Minister of Everything" during this period because he was a particularly high-profile spokesman for the Esquivel government.

After the UDP's devastating 1998 election loss in which he was one of only three UDP winners, Barrow was elevated to UDP party leader and Leader of the Opposition, succeeding the defeated Esquivel. Barrow presided over the smallest oppositions (three and seven respectively) in the House of Representatives since 1974 and ever in the UDP's history. Barrow was reelected in 1998 and 2003 by closer margins than his previous elections over attorney Richard "Dickie" Bradley. He has since been re-elected by comfortable majorities.

Prior to his retirement in 2020, Barrow was the most senior member of the UDP delegation in the Belize House as well as the Area Representative with the longest tenure of uninterrupted service. Among other Area Representatives, only Said Musa has had a longer cumulative time in office.

=== Prime Minister of Belize ===
The UDP won a massive victory, with 25 out of 31 seats, in the general election held on 7 February 2008, and Barrow was sworn in as prime minister on 8 February. He is the country's first black Prime Minister. He announced his Cabinet, including himself as Minister of Finance, on 11 February.

The UDP won a reduced majority in the 2012 general election and Barrow started his second term as prime minister on 9 March 2012. He announced his cabinet, including himself as the Minister of Finance and Economic Development, on 12 March 2012.

Barrow led the UDP to a third consecutive general election victory in November 2015, however he stated the election would be his last as party leader.

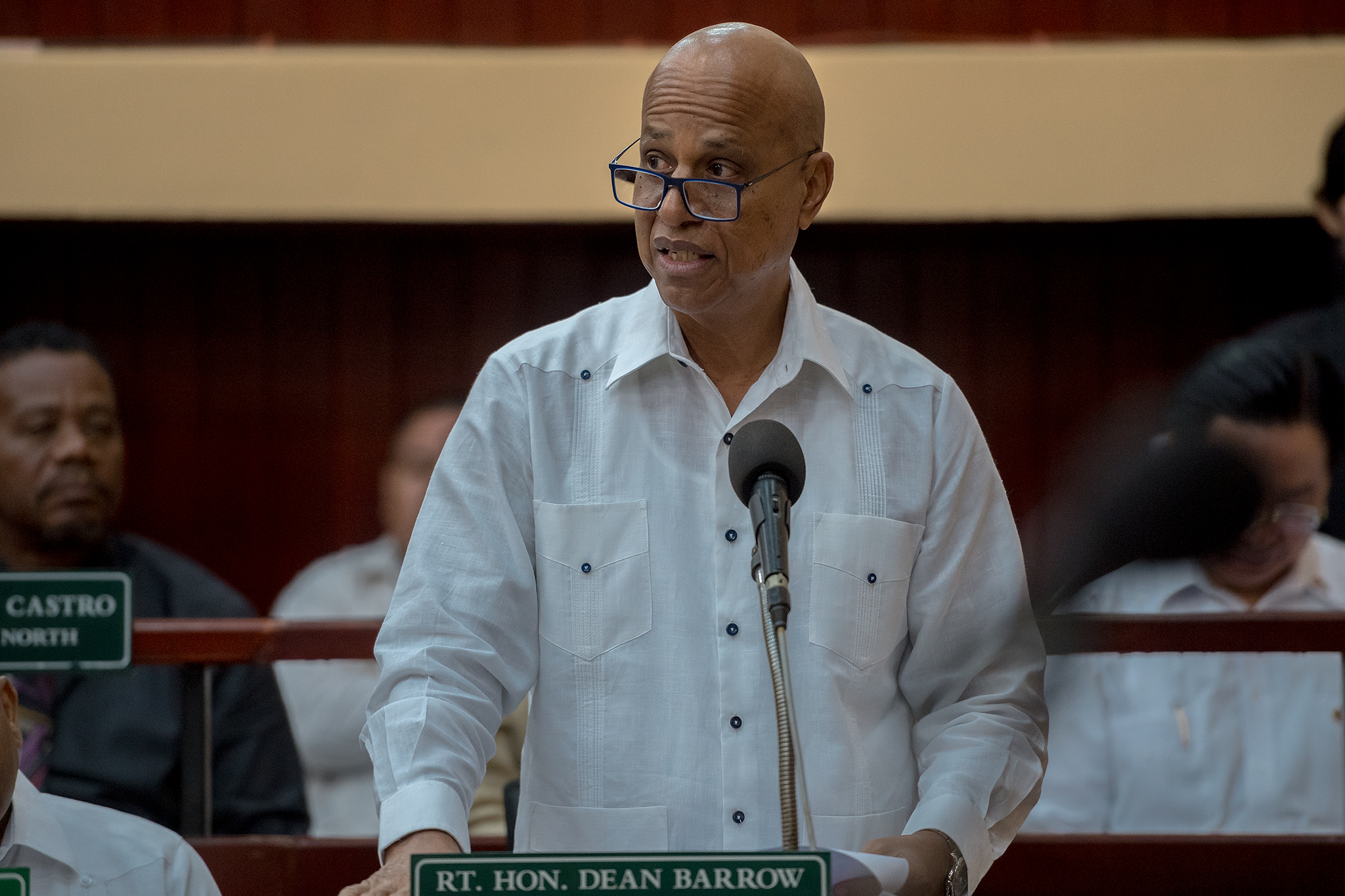
Dean Barrow addresses the National Assembly of Belize in Belmopan in 2018

=== Retirement from politics in 2020 ===
Citing health issues, Barrow initially said he would step down as prime minister no later than the end of 2019 and hinted he could do so earlier.

However, on 18 November 2018, Barrow's Cabinet urged him to remain as Prime Minister of Belize until the 2020 Belizean general election. He said that he would take that move.

A convention to name Barrow's successor as UDP party leader was tentatively scheduled for May 2019, but in August 2019, the UDP postponed the date to 9 February 2020.

There were two confirmed candidates for the leadership convention, with the first one being Deputy Prime Minister, Patrick Faber and the other being National Security Minister, John Saldivar.

Barrow also stood down from his House seat in Queen's Square in the 2020 general election, endorsing his sister, Denise "Sister B" Barrow, to succeed him.

=== Return to private practice ===
Barrow returned to private practice and resumed his position as head of litigation at the law firm of Barrow & Williams LLP. He has since then been involved in many high-profile cases.

== Personal life ==
Barrow has four children. The oldest, born Jamal Barrow, is a former rapper who performed under the name Shyne. He has since changed his name to Moses Michael Levi Barrow. He was elected to the Belize House of Representatives with the center-right Belize United Democratic Party in the Belize City-based Mesopotamia constituency in the 2020 Belizean general election. He was subsequently also appointed the Opposition Leader in the House of Representatives and the leader of the Belize United Democratic Party, in both June 2021 (until September 2021) and February 2022.

With his first wife, Lois Young SC, their son Anwar runs a small-scale lending institution. Their daughter Deanne is a chemical engineer and an attorney. She practiced law out of her mother's (Lois Young) firm and is now an international patent attorney.

Barrow was married a second time 7 February 2009 in Savannah, Georgia to his long-time girlfriend Kim Simplis. They have one daughter, Salima.

== Education ==
Barrow attended St. Michael's College in Belize and the University of the West Indies at Cave Hill in Barbados (LL.B. 1973); Norman Manley Law School, Mona, Kingston, Jamaica (Certificate of Legal Education, 1975); University of Miami School of Law (LL.M., 1981); University of Miami (M.A. International Relations).

Party political offices
Preceded by Manuel Esquivel	Leader of the United Democratic Party; 1998–2020	Succeeded by Patrick Faber
Political offices
Preceded by George Cadle Price	Leader of the Opposition; 1998–2008	Succeeded by Said Musa
Preceded by Said Musa	Prime Minister of Belize; 2008–2020	Succeeded by Johnny Briceño
