= Elections in Belize =

Elections in Belize are the duly held elections held at various levels of government in the nation of Belize.

== Dissolving elected bodies ==
=== The Legislature ===
Dissolving the National Assembly of Belize is the prerogative of the Governor General of Belize, currently Dame Froyla Tzalam. Under sections 84 and 85 of the Constitution, the Governor General can at any time dissolve or prorogue the Assembly under the advice of the Prime Minister of Belize, with the caveat that a general election must be called within three months of such dissolution, unless the Governor General sees no reason to do so.

=== City and town councils ===
City and town councils dissolve on the last Sunday of February in every third year, with the election called for the first Wednesday in March in every third year.

=== Example ===
Amandala columnist Henry Gordon, refuting a statement by former Prime Minister Said Musa, laid out the boundaries under which national elections can be called in a recent article. Musa had said that elections would be held by March 2008 and that he would not take an election into "the extra three months", as he claimed Gordon had supposed. Gordon responded that there is no such provision in the Constitution and that Musa was being obscure on the matter.

Mr. Musa had requested a dissolution of the National Assembly on January 24, 2003, 4 years, 7 months and 4 days after the last general election, August 27, 1998. That dissolution was granted by Young on February 4, 2003, at which time the Assembly stood dissolved while preparations were made for elections on March 5, 2003. The PUP won the elections, with Musa continuing as Prime Minister. But his term did not begin, says Gordon, until the first meeting of the new National Assembly, on April 4, 2003. Since a National Assembly must continue for five years from this first sitting under Section 84, subsec. 2, the current assembly shall stand dissolved- unless sooner dissolved- on April 3, 2008. It follows that the latest a general election can be called after that date is July 3, 2008. Mr. Musa ended speculation over the date of general elections by calling them for February 7, 2008.

- Gordon's full statement

== General elections ==
On the national level Belize elects a bicameral legislature called the National Assembly. The more powerful lower chamber, the House of Representatives, currently has 31 members elected for terms up to five years in single-seat constituencies on a first past the post basis. Members of the Belize House are called "area representatives" and are accorded the title of "The Honourable."

=== Parties ===
Belize has a two-party system, which has been in place since the pre-independence 1974 election, consisting of the centre-left People's United Party (PUP) and the centre-right United Democratic Party (UDP). It has been extremely difficult for anybody to achieve electoral success as an independent or under the banner of any other party. Philip Goldson, a longtime UDP area representative who ran under the National Alliance for Belizean Rights banner in 1993, is the only successful candidate outside the two major parties since independence.

Only once in recent general elections has an independent candidate received more votes than a major party candidate. Wilfred Elrington, running independently in 2003, finished second in front of the UDP candidate in the Pickstock constituency. Like Goldson, Elrington also had a longstanding prior relationship with the UDP. He later rejoined the UDP and won election to the Belize House from Pickstock in 2009.

Despite the overall abysmal record of independent candidates and third parties, the political process in Belize still sees its fair share of well-intentioned people stepping forward to serve the nation.

=== Process ===
All major Belizean political parties nominate House candidates via a preselection process similar to those used in other Westminster systems. These nominees are called "standard-bearers." In most cases, incumbent House members retain standard-bearer status for their party, while the opposition party in a given constituency often nominates its standard-bearer months or even years in advance of a general election. Standard bearers are considered party officials responsible for overall political organization in their particular constituencies regardless of whether they currently serve in the Belize House or not.

Members of the 13-seat upper house of the National Assembly, the Senate, are officially appointed by the Governor-General of Belize. In current practice, the majority party in the House appoints six senators and the minority party appoints three. The remaining four senators are appointed by nonpartisan groups.

The most recent general election was held on 11 November 2020.

=== Constituencies ===
Since 2008 the six Districts of Belize have been subdivided into 31 constituencies. Constituency breakdown by district is as follows:

- Belize District: 13 (including 10 in Belize City)
- Cayo District: 6
- Corozal District: 4
- Orange Walk District: 4
- Stann Creek District: 2
- Toledo District: 2

== Municipal elections ==
Unlike general elections which are held every five years or at the pleasure of the governor-general, by statute cities and towns hold municipal elections on the first Wednesday in March every third year. Belize has seven towns and two recognized cities, Belize City (since 1945) and Belmopan (since 2000). The seven settlements with town status are Benque Viejo del Carmen, Corozal Town, Dangriga, Orange Walk Town, Punta Gorda, San Ignacio/Santa Elena and San Pedro Town. Smaller settlements hold elections independent of this schedule.

Belize City, due to its size, carries greater representation and importance, with one mayor and ten councilors elected (previously nine individuals out of which the mayor was selected), as opposed to one mayor and six councilors for Belmopan and the towns. The two-party system is in effect here as well, but independents and third party candidates have of late been doing relatively well in local elections. The last municipal election was held on 4 March 2015. The next municipal election is tentatively scheduled for 6 March 2024.

== By-elections and referendums ==
These types of elections are held on a less regular basis. By-elections are usually held to replace representatives either locally or nationally, who are lost during the course of their term for various reasons.

Referendums are normally held on issues of local or national importance. Belize had never held a national referendum before 2008, though one has consistently been demanded in order to settle the Guatemalan claim to Belize. Provisions have been made for a treaty to settle this claim to go to a referendum. In 1999, residents of Belmopan held a referendum to determine whether they would be responsible for their own affairs as a city; a majority voted yes, and Belmopan held its first City Council election less than a year later.

Prime Minister Said Musa announced on 7 January 2008 that a nonbinding national referendum would be held on the same date as general elections, asking the people of Belize to decide whether they wanted the country's upper house, the Senate, to be elected. The referendum passed with 61 percent of voters supporting an elected Senate.

=== List of by-elections in Belize ===
Only six by-elections have been called for Belize House seats since the country became independent in September 1981. In all but two, the incumbent party failed to retain the seat. Several other by-elections have been held at the municipal level.

Constituency	Date	Incumbent	Party	Winner	Party	Cause	Retained
Toledo East	17 July 2024	Michael Espat	PUP	Osmond Martinez	PUP	Death (heart failure)	Yes
Corozal Bay	3 March 2021	David Vega	PUP	Elvia Vega-Samos	PUP	Death (COVID-19)	Yes
Dangriga	8 July 2015	Ivan Ramos	PUP	Frank Mena	UDP	Resignation	No
Cayo North	5 January 2015	Joseph Mahmud	PUP	Omar Figueroa	UDP	Resignation	No
Cayo South	29 October 2003	Agripino Cawich	PUP	John Saldivar	UDP	Death (cancer)	No
Freetown	January 1993	Derek Aikman	NABR	Jorge Espat	PUP	Expelled from House due to bankruptcy	No

== Government of elections ==
In Belize, elections are supervised by the Elections and Boundaries Commission under the control of a Chief Elections Officer, responsible for conducting fair elections. Stuart Leslie was appointed to the post in August 2005, replacing veteran Myrtle Palacio. The EBC also has a board of directors which includes party representatives. The EBC was established in 1978 to relieve the public service of the duties of holding elections by themselves; an Elections and Boundaries Department was added in 1988. The EBD maintains a list of voters at offices countrywide and new voters regularly come in to sign on to the voter registration list for elections. The list was last revamped in 1997. The vote is restricted to Belizeans 18 years and older; the 18-year-old vote has been in place since 1978.

Stuart Leslie confirmed to local television station 7 News that he would not serve as Chief Elections Officer beyond December 2006, having accepted a post in the Ministry of Foreign Affairs. 7 News also reported that the usual reregistration exercise conducted every decade is about due (the last one having taken place nine years ago), but that the political parties are willing to delay it until after 2008 elections take place. 7 News article

In December 2006 career public officer Dorothy Bradley succeeded Leslie as Chief Elections Officer and immediately committed herself to streamlining the electoral process and restoring voter confidence. News 5 report Bradley has reportedly resigned as of September 2007, leaving the position vacant.

=== List of Chief Election Officers since 1988 ===
- 1988-1994: Winston Carr
- 1994-1999: Urban A. Reyes
- 1999-2005: Myrtle Palacio
- 2005-2006: Stuart Leslie
- December 2006-September 2007: Dorothy Bradley
- September 2007 – 2010: Ruth Meighan (acting)
- February 2010 – October 2011: Dorothy Bradley
- October 2011 – present: Josephine Tamai

== See also ==
- List of political parties in Belize
