= The Nationalist Movement (Belize) =

- 1930s–1950s
The Belizean Labor Movement	The Declaration of Independence
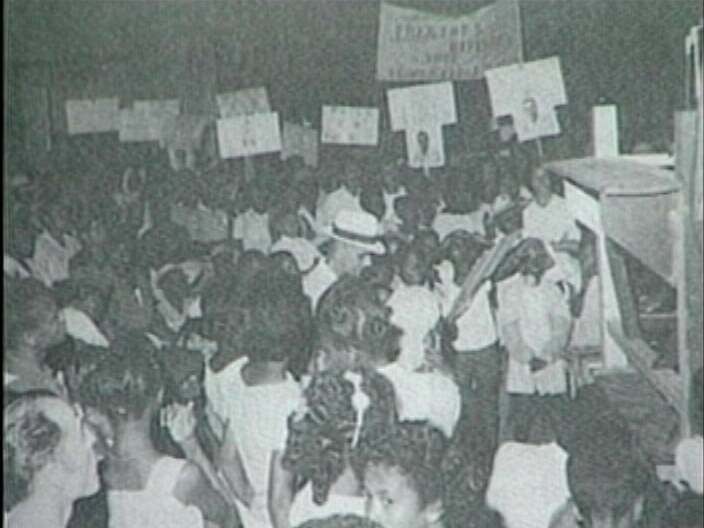
- A Major Event in the Political Campaign for Nationalism
- Including: The passing of Universal Adult Suffrage
- Leader(s): Antonio Soberanis Gómez, Leigh Richardson, George Cadle Price and Philip Goldson

The Nationalist Movement seeking independence for Belize (then called British Honduras) first arose in the 1930s and 1940s. Three groups played important roles in developing the movement. One group consisted of working-class individuals and emphasised labour issues. This group originated with Antonio Soberanis Gómez and the Labourers and Unemployed Association (LUA) between 1934 and 1937 and continued through the General Workers Union (GWU). The second group, a radical black nationalist movement, emerged during World War II. Its leaders came from the LUA and the local branch of Marcus Garvey's Universal Negro Improvement Association (UNIA). This group called itself variously the British Honduras Independent Labour Party, the People's Republican Party, and the People's National Committee. The third group consisted of people such as the Christian Social Action Group (CSAG) who engaged in electoral politics within the narrow limits defined by the constitution. From the 1950s onwards the nationalist movement came to be dominated by the People's United Party which led the country to independence in 1981.

== Labour Movement ==
Around the 1930s and 1940s, the Belizean economy was mainly based on forestry which was an industry that was declining quickly at the time. The Labour movement came into being in 1934 when Antonio Soberanis Gómez led a group of struggling workers in the movement called the Labourers and Unemployed Association (LUA) to fight for more jobs and better pay. This made the people begin to question what being colonized by England had done for Belize. The people then thought how a country with many resources, wealthy landowners and merchants, had so much poverty.

Soberanis was jailed under a new sedition law in 1935. Still, the labour agitation achieved a great deal. Of most immediate importance was the creation of relief work by a governor who saw it as a way to avoid civil disturbances. Workers built more than 300 kilometres of roads. The greatest achievements of the agitation of the 1930s, and the ensuing Report of West India Royal Commission, were the labour reforms passed between 1941 and 1943. Trade unions were legalised in 1941, but the laws did not require employers to recognise these unions. The Employers and Workers Bill, passed on 27 April 1943, finally removed breach-of-labour-contract from the criminal code and enabled British Honduras's infant trade unions to pursue the struggle for improving labour conditions. The General Worker's Union (GWU), was registered in 1943, and quickly expanded into a nationwide organisation.

Pressure resulting from forestry industry unemployment was eased during World War II (1939–1945) because workers in the thousands emigrated to Britain for jobs there in forestry, to work in Panama for the building of the Panama Canal and to the United States of America for jobs in agriculture.

== Black nationalists ==
A branch of Marcus Garvey's Universal Negro Improvement Association (UNIA) movement formed in British Honduras in 1920. William Campbell was president of the branch and Samuel Haynes was its general secretary. Garvey himself came to British Honduras to visit the new branch in 1921, and spoke at public meetings about the aims and activities of the UNIA. His visit was a success, with one meeting attracting about 800 people. Despite the concerns of the Governor and the British Honduras establishment, Garvey insisted he was a loyal subject of the British empire and that the UNIA wished only to help black people to build a government of their own. Samuel Haynes left British Honduras along with Garvey, something which hampered further organisation of the British Honduras UNIA Branch. The Branch later became embroiled in a dispute over a legacy left by a benefactor named Isaiah Morter, and even though Garvey returned to British Honduras again in 1929 to try to settle the dispute, the branch split as a result. The UNIA therefore became relatively inactive from this time onwards, however it still exercised great influence over the nationalist movement throughout the 1930s and 40s. Among its leaders were Lionel Francis, L.D. Kemp, and Calvert Staine, (vice president).

A radical nationalist group, first called the British Honduras Independent Labour Party, then the People's Republican Party, and finally the People's Nationalist Committee was formed in 1940. At their meetings the group called for the expulsion of all white men, the creation of a republic in union with the United States of America and the substitution as the national flag of the Union Jack with the flag of 'Belize Honduras'. Among its leaders were John Lahoodie, Gabriel Adderley, and its chief leader Joseph Campbell, also known as the 'Lion of Judah'. They were frequently attacked at their meetings by loyalists, and Campbell was repeatedly jailed. Lahoodie and Adderley later went to live in Guatemala.

Later in 1969, Evan X Hyde, a young black middle-class Creole, and graduate Dartmouth College, formed the United Black Association for Development (UBAD) on a black nationalist platform and began seriously attacking the PUP's economic and social policies, equating them with neo-colonialism and denouncing them as "politricks". He joined trained lawyers Said Musa and Assad Shoman in the formation of their People's Action Committee (PAC), which was against "the North Atlantic economic domination (of Belize)" (Shoman) and in the analogue movement RAM (Revolutionary Action Movement) formed by a fusion of the two. Although none of these movements lasted for very long, they all left serious impressions on the psyche of the PUP, which prided itself on being the party of the people.

== Christian Social Action Group ==
In 1947, a group of graduates of the elite Catholic Saint John's College formed the Christian Social Action Group (CSAG) which won control of the Belize City Council. The goals of the CSAG included a "Natives First" campaign and an extension of the franchise to elect a more representative government. One member of this group, George Cadle Price, topped the polls in the 1947 election when he opposed immigration schemes and import controls and rode a wave of feeling against a British proposal for a federation of its colonies in the Caribbean. The CSAG also started a newspaper, the Belize Billboard edited by Philip Goldson and Leigh Richardson. The CSAG went on to play a major role in the formation of the People's United Party (PUP). Price joined the PUP and remained the predominant politician in the country from the early 1950s until his retirement in 1996.

== People's United Party ==
On December 31, 1949, there was a devaluation of the Belize dollar which caused the situation of the workers to worsen. The People's Committee was formed as a protest against the devaluation and quickly became a campaign against the entire colonial system. The People's Committee became the People's United Party (PUP) on September 29, 1950. The newly formed group was a political party's objective against colonialism and towards political and economic independence.

In 1951, the group split and the leaders of the party now were Leigh Richardson, George Cadle Price and Philip Goldson.The main political task set by these leaders was to create national unity from the colonially created divisions.

They traveled throughout the country trying to get people to unite to fight for their rights and the country's independence. The leaders educated people about the problems of colonialism and how the poor living conditions were caused by the system of exploitation. These motivated leaders were concerned with raising the standard of living of the people and were determined to end colonialism.

=== Crusade Against Colonialism ===
The PUP for the moment turned its attention to the labour front. George Price was named head of the GWU in April 1952, and returning leaders Richardson and Goldson called for a "Crusade against Colonialism". The national holiday, on September 10, was dominated by a PUP-sponsored parade that clearly showed how much it had grown beyond its early years.

An opportunity came in October 1952 after workers at a Stann Creek citrus factory called a strike and were joined by their fellows in the Colonial Development Cooperation, United Fruit Company, Public Works Department and Belize Estate and Produce Company (B.E.C.) sawmill operations. The PUP had formed a strong alliance with the GWU and supported the striking workers. A national strike to protest against the economic conditions was called in October 1952. Originally called for two days, after ten days with the support of Belizeans across the country, the colonial government was forced to capitulate and call for negotiations with the management of all the companies involved.

However, the B.E.C. did not agree to negotiate with the union for wage improvements and better working conditions and shut down its sawmill leaving 268 workers jobless. There was a forty nine day holdout by the B.E.C. where they stopped the strike by using scab labour that was protected by police. This was met with violence from demonstrators and a number of people were arrested, but by December 8 some 48 workers were on the job and the GWU called off the strike.

Despite the non-compliance of the B.E.C., the leaders felt that the strike was a success because it showed that working class solidarity gave workers power and with that they gained benefits. The strike placed the People's United Party in the public domain as a party for working people. Membership in the GWU (and support for the PUP) rose dramatically.

=== Struggle for universal suffrage ===
Although the PUP emphasized change in the economic conditions of the country, they also wanted to change the colonial political system. The PUP began to demand political power for the people which required constitutional change. Firstly, the right to vote had to be given to the people. While fighting for universal adult suffrage (the right for all adults to vote), the nationalist leaders had to convince people to change their attitudes.

Some people (the "loyalists") in the country felt threatened by any change to the system. The "loyalists" were those people in the "middle class", such as traders and civil servants, that benefited from the colonial system and argued against adult suffrage. They thought the colony was too underdeveloped and its people were too illiterate to have a voting right. Instead of universal suffrage, they suggested a literacy test for voters; a system of indirect voting by the districts outside of Belize City; and reserved powers for the governor.

The political struggle was long and it took civil action to enable the people to make gains in the 1950s. It took a lot of hard work to organize the movement for decolonization. This major struggle became violent at times. For example, a crowd stoned the homes of some politicians regarded as Pro-Britishers and harmed the police guard at the Governor's residence. Due to such violence the government declared a state of emergency which lasted 137 days. The poor economic and social conditions of many people living in Belize in the 1950s encouraged them to think about self-government and independence, thus strengthening the nationalist movement.

The administrators of the colony created a new party financed by the Belize Estate and Produce Company. When declaring a state of emergency, force was used by passing laws, prosecuting and jailing leaders. The colonial administrators gave in to small reforms. Later on, they appealed the people's loyalty to the King and the British Empire, but nothing relieved the major political uprising. After years of political struggle, Universal adult suffrage was won in 1954 by the PUP with the support of the people. On April 28, 1954, the first general elections were held and the PUP won eight of the nine elected seats and 67 per cent of the vote. After, Belizeans began to win increased participation through new constitutions. All leading to self-governance and eventually, the country's independence.
