= 1993 Belizean general election =

- 30 June 1993

All 29 seats in the House of Representatives 15 seats needed for a majority
- Registered: 98,371
- Turnout: 72.10% (▼0.52pp)
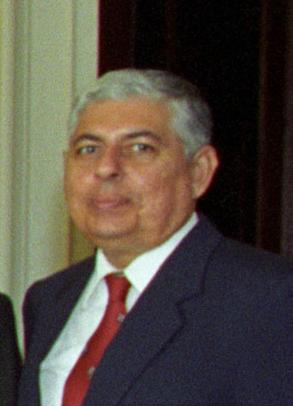

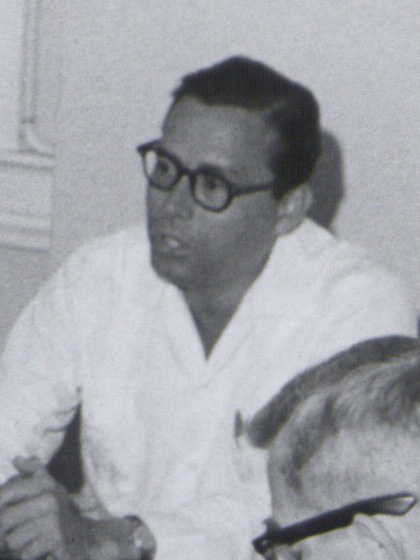
	First party	Second party
Leader	Manuel Esquivel	George Cadle Price
Party	UDP–NABR	PUP
Leader since	1983	1956
Leader's seat	Caribbean Shores	Pickstock
Last election	49.02%, 13 seats	50.87%, 15 seats
Seats won	16	13
Seat change	▲3	▼2
Popular vote	34,306	36,082
Percentage	48.71%	51.23%
Swing	▼0.31 pp	▲0.36 pp
- Results by constituency
Prime Minister before election
George Cadle Price
PUP
Elected Prime Minister
Manuel Esquivel
UDP

General elections were held in Belize on 30 June 1993. Although the People's United Party received the most votes, the United Democratic Party–National Alliance for Belizean Rights alliance won the most seats. Voter turnout was 72%.

== Background ==
British forces, kept in Belize by agreement of its government since independence in 1981, were scheduled to leave in 1993 or 1994. There was widespread belief that Belize would fall prey to Guatemalan incursions if the British left.

The PUP won the previous election with a two-seat majority. However, by early 1993 its majority had increased to six thanks to newly elected UDP Area Rep. William Usher of Toledo West crossing the floor to the PUP days after the 1989 election, and a January 1993 by-election win in Freetown after the UDP's Derek Aikman was forced to resign due to bankruptcy. Success in the subsequent March municipal elections also gave the PUP added confidence.

Meanwhile, the UDP had been in apparent disarray since 1991, when a group led by longtime Area Rep. Philip Goldson broke with the party to form the National Alliance for Belizean Rights over disagreements on how to handle the longstanding Belizean–Guatemalan territorial dispute. This all compelled Prime Minister George Price to call elections nearly 18 months early (they were not constitutionally due until at least December 1994).

With Price's move the UDP and NABR promptly sought a coalition to achieve victory at the polls. However, Goldson was the NABR's only successful candidate.

== Results ==
The results were extremely close in several constituencies. In Caribbean Shores and Stann Creek West the UDP–NABR candidates won by 40 and 34 votes. The UDP–NABR candidate in Cayo North won by 18 votes. In Orange Walk North, the UDP–NABR won by five votes. The PUP candidate in Belize Rural North won by four votes, while the UDP–NABR candidate in Toledo East was elected by the same margin. The PUP candidate in Corozal Southwest won by three votes, while in Collet, the UDP–NABR candidate won by a single vote.

One NABR candidate, Philip Goldson, was elected.

Although the PUP won a majority of votes nationwide, due to the first past the post voting system the UDP/NABR coalition won a slim majority of seats and therefore formed the next government. The election would be Price's last as PUP leader after over 35 years. He was succeeded as party leader in 1996 by Said Musa.

Party	Votes	%	Seats	+/–
People's United Party	36,082	51.23	13	–2
UDP–NABR	34,306	48.71	16	+3
Independents	43	0.06	0	0
Total	70,431	100.00	29	+1
Valid votes	70,431	99.30		
Invalid/blank votes	499	0.70		
Total votes	70,930	100.00		
Registered voters/turnout	98,371	72.10		
Source: Elections and Boundaries Department

=== Results by constituency ===
Constituency	PUP		UDP-NABR		Ind.		Valid	Total	Turnout	Registered
Freetown (Belize City)	1214	61.5%	761	38.5%			1975	1977	72%	2758
Caribbean Shores (Belize City)	1275	49.2%	1315	50.8%			2590	2613	67%	3901
Pickstock (Belize City)	740	52.9%	659	47.1%			1399	1407	58%	2424
Fort George (Belize City)	1084	68.3%	504	31.7%			1588	1608	57%	2832
Albert (Belize City)	664	43.4%	865	56.6%			1529	1532	57%	2701
Port Loyola (Belize City)	1130	43.7%	1457	56.3%			2587	2621	62%	4196
Queen's Square (Belize City)	532	31.4%	1162	68.6%			1694	1707	58%	2943
Mesopotomia (Belize City)	735	42.0%	1016	58.0%			1751	1769	58%	3052
Lake Independence (Belize City)	1184	47.6%	1301	52.4%			2485	2504	60%	4139
Collet (Belize City)	950	49.7%	951	49.8%	10	0.5%	1911	1914	60%	3203
Belize Rural Central	1431	72.9%	532	27.1%			1963	1983	71%	2805
Belize Rural North	943	50.1%	939	49.9%			1882	1905	71%	2699
Belize Rural South	1005	56.2%	784	43.8%			1789	1796	81%	2218
Corozal North	1696	59.1%	1172	40.9%			2868	2885	85%	3413
Corozal Bay	1526	53.5%	1329	46.5%			2855	2869	74%	3868
Corozal South East	1950	60.1%	1294	39.9%			3244	3268	89%	3672
Corozal South West	1464	50.1%	1461	49.9%			2925	2938	81%	3646
Orange Walk Central	1408	55.7%	1119	44.3%			2527	2546	78%	3246
Orange Walk North	1421	49.9%	1426	50.1%			2847	2859	85%	3364
Orange Walk South	1498	47.0%	1687	53.0%			3185	3188	87%	3649
Orange Walk East	1404	46.4%	1624	53.6%			3028	3034	81%	3734
Cayo South	1379	52.6%	1212	46.2%	33	1.3%	2624	2664	70%	3795
Cayo North	1872	49.8%	1890	50.2%			3762	3797	76%	4964
Cayo Central	1420	48.5%	1508	51.5%			2928	2953	75%	3934
Cayo West	1382	55.5%	1109	44.5%			2491	2513	79%	3168
Dangriga (Stann Creek)	1151	43.6%	1489	56.4%			2640	2653	64%	4123
Stann Creek West	1016	49.2%	1050	50.8%			2066	2091	77%	2716
Toledo East	1548	49.9%	1552	50.1%			3100	3111	75%	4135
Toledo West	1060	48.2%	1138	51.8%			2198	2225	72%	3073
Total	36082	51.2%	34306	48.7%	43	0.1%	70431	70930	72%	98371
Source: PDBA
