= George Cadle Price =

Leader of Belize (1961–1984, 1989–1993)

The Right Honourable George Cadle Price
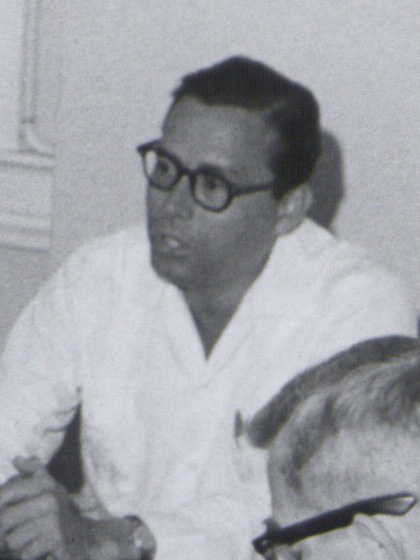
- Price in 1965

1st Prime Minister of Belize
- In office 7 September 1989 – 13 July 1993
- Monarch: Elizabeth II
- Governor-General: Elmira Minita Gordon
- Deputy: Florencio Marin
- Preceded by: Manuel Esquivel
- Succeeded by: Manuel Esquivel
- In office 12 September 1981 – 17 December 1984
- Monarch: Elizabeth II
- Governor-General: Elmira Minita Gordon
- Deputy: Florencio Marin
- Preceded by: Himself (as Prime Minister)
- Succeeded by: Manuel Esquivel

Premier of Belize
- In office 1 June 1973 – 12 September 1981
- Preceded by: Himself (as Prime Minister of British Honduras)
- Succeeded by: Himself (as Prime Minister)

Premier of British Honduras
- In office 1 January 1964 – 1 June 1973
- Preceded by: Himself (as First Minister)
- Succeeded by: Himself (as Prime Minister of Belize)

First Minister of British Honduras
- In office 7 April 1961 – 1 January 1964
- Preceded by: office created
- Succeeded by: Himself (as Prime Minister)

Leader of the Opposition
- In office 3 July 1993 – 10 November 1996
- Monarch: Elizabeth II
- Governors General: Elmira Minita Gordon; Colville Young
- Prime Minister: Manuel Esquivel
- Preceded by: Manuel Esquivel
- Succeeded by: Said Musa

Member of the Belize House of Representatives for Pickstock
- In office 4 September 1989 – 5 March 2003
- Preceded by: Jane Ellen Usher
- Succeeded by: Godfrey Smith

Member of the Belize House of Representatives for Freetown
- In office 26 March 1961 – 14 December 1984
- Preceded by: (constituency created)
- Succeeded by: Derek Aikman

Member of the British Honduras Legislative Assembly for Belize North
- In office 28 April 1954 – 26 March 1961
- Preceded by: (constituency created)
- Succeeded by: (constituency abolished)

Personal details
- Born: 15 January 1919 Belize City, British Honduras (now Belize)
- Died: 19 September 2011 (aged 92) Belize City, Belize
- Party: People's United Party

George Cadle Price (15 January 1919 – 19 September 2011) was a Belizean statesman who served as the head of government of Belize from 1961 to 1984 and 1989 to 1993. He was the first minister and premier under British rule until independence in 1981 and was the nation's first prime minister after independence that year. He is considered one of the principal architects of Belizean independence. Today he is referred to by many as the "Father of the Nation". Price effectively dominated Belizean politics from the early 1960s until his 1996 retirement from party leadership, having been the nation's head of government under various titles for most of that period.

He entered politics in 1947 with his election to the Belize City Council. In 1949, with the devaluation of the British Honduran dollar he, together with a group of citizens, formed the People's Committee. It was the start of the "peaceful, constructive Belizean revolution". On 29 September 1950, he co-founded the People's United Party, which he led for four decades and which was devoted to the political and economic independence of the British colony, then known as British Honduras.

== Early life and education ==
George Price was born in Belize City in what was then British Honduras, to William and Irene Secilia (née Escalante) Price. His father was an upper middle-class Creole businessman and officer of partial Scottish descent. His mother was a woman of mixed Maya and Mestizo descent from Orange Walk who had later moved to Belize City following the death of her mother. He was the third eldest child and had eight sisters and two brothers in total. Price lived in the Price family house on Pickstock Street in the North Side of Belize City, and the family had five servants including a cook and maid.

Price received his early education at Holy Redeemer Primary School and St. John's College High School (SJC). He survived the hurricane of 1931 which destroyed SJC at Loyola Park, swimming away from the wreckage. Under the Jesuits, he was exposed to the teachings of Catholic social justice, in particular the encyclical Rerum novarum. Upon graduation, the young Price felt a call to the priesthood, so he went to study abroad, first attending Saint Augustine's Minor Seminary in Mississippi, United States, and later the Mayor Seminario Conciliar in Guatemala City. Witnessing the development of Guatemala compared to British Honduras at the time radicalized Price as he believed that the British were holding the colony back from achieving the development of its Central American neighbors.

The war in Europe prevented him from completing his studies in Rome and, instead, George Price returned to Belize. Price never went on to become a priest, although throughout his life Price remained a devout Roman Catholic and attended Mass daily. Upon his return to Belize he was hired by local businessman Robert Sidney Turton as his private secretary. Price also contributed to the Belize Billboard, then run by Philip Goldson.

== Early political career ==
After receiving encouragement from Turton, Price ran for election to the Belize City Council in 1944 and 1947, being successful in 1947. Upon the formation of the People's Committee (PC) in 1950, Price was named its Assistant Secretary, and in a famous speech later that year claimed that "National Unity" propelled the PC's actions. Later that year, in September of 1950, the PC was dissolved and in its place, Price, alongside other prominent Belizean activists John Smith, Leigh Richardson, and Philip Goldson, founded the People's United Party (PUP). With the formation of the PUP, Price's stature rose and he ascended through the party ranks until he became Party Leader following a leadership dispute with Leigh Richardson and Philip Goldson in 1956 over whether or not Belize should seek to join the West Indies Federation. Price vehemently opposed joining the federation, while Richardson and Goldson were in favor of it. Richardson and Goldson left the party following the dispute, leaving Price to assume the leadership of the PUP, a position he would hold until 1996. Following the dispute, Richardson and Goldson left the PUP went on to found the short-lived Honduran Independence Party (HIP).

In addition to his position in the PUP, Price also oversaw the integration of the General Workers' Union (GWU) with the PUP, becoming the union's President in 1952. Price was behind the 1952 General Strike, aiming to strengthen the party. Following Price's takeover of the party, the GWU sided with the new HIP, causing Price and the PUP to found the rival Christian Democratic Union (CDU). This schism caused the power of trade unions in Belize to be eclipsed by those of political parties, and the primary movement in Belize going forward became the Price-led nationalist movement.

Price was first elected to the colony's newly created Legislative Assembly in 1954, the first election held in Belize under universal adult suffrage. In 1957, despite the formation of the HIP, the PUP in its first election under Price easily swept all nine seats in the Legislative Assembly. Price repeated the same electoral feat in 1961 following the expansion of the legislature from 9 to 18 seats. From 1956 to 1962, Price also served as mayor of Belize City.

== Achieving self-rule and independence ==
Price led negotiations with the British to achieve self-rule for British Honduras, and eventually independence. His efforts were hampered by accusations that Price had taken bribes from Guatemala, and the British authorities accused Price of sedition, charging him with the act in 1958. The British accusations of sedition did not have the desired effect on Price and the PUP, and did not affect their popularity.

In 1961, British Honduras was struck by Hurricane Hattie, devastating much of Belize City. Price, who envisioned a Belize that included the rural areas and was not as centered on Belize City, took the opportunity to propose building a new capital farther inland. Price successfully lobbied the British in the period following Hattie, and the construction of a new capital, Belmopan, was included in the British aid and rehabilitation projects. However, following his trial for sedition, and the reliance the country had on British aid in the aftermath of Hurricane Hattie, Price was pushed into closer cooperation with the British.

=== Self-government ===
In 1963, the British government agreed to grant Belize full internal self-government, which was seen as the last step prior to achieving independence. From the beginning of self-rule until independence, Price maintained his position as First Minister and later Premier of Belize, with the PUP continuing to dominate every single election. The PUP did however, lose its status as the only party in government to the National Independence Party (NIP), led by Philip Goldson. Goldson and the NIP consistently campaigned that Price and the PUP were too lenient on the issue of Guatemala, and that pursuing independence too quickly or without British guarantees would open the country up to a Guatemalan invasion.

While Goldson and the NIP pressed Price from the right, Price and the PUP also faced insurgent political movements from the left, accusing the PUP of not doing enough to materially improve the lives of Belizeans, and criticizing the PUP's anti-communist stance. The primary movements in this sector were the United Black Association for Development (UBAD) led by Evan X Hyde, which sought to import American ideals of "black power" to Belize, and the People's Action Committee (PAC) led by Assad Shoman and Said Musa. The two movements briefly joined into the Revolutionary Action Movement (RAM), but broke apart over internal disagreements. The PUP distrusted these new movements, although Price assured them he shared their same goals. While UBAD fractured and disbanded, Hyde continued to be a frequent critic of Price as editor and founder of the Amandala newspaper, accusing him of being a shepherd who treated the Belizean people like sheep. Meanwhile, Price successfully absorbed the PAC along with Shoman and Musa into the PUP, offering them the ability to run for seats in Legislative Assembly during the 1974 election. This was also the first election in which the PUP's main opponent was the new United Democratic Party (UDP), led by Dean Lindo, which had formed as a merger of the NIP, the People's Development Movement, and the Liberal Party in 1973 to present a stronger unified opposition to the PUP.

=== Internationalisation and the Guatemala dispute ===
The primary roadblock in securing Belize's independence was the unresolved border dispute with Guatemala. The British were reluctant to give Belize independence while the issue remained live, and while Price desired independence without a British guarantee of security, as had been the case with other independent Commonwealth countries, the opposition led by Goldson demanded a guarantee be a prerequisite for independence. The British on the other hand, refused the possibility of a guarantee. During negotiations between Belize, the British, and Guatemala over the dispute, Guatemala demanded a quarter of Belize's territory to recognize Belizean independence. The British and the United States urged Price to accept the deal, but Price was adamant about independence without ceding any Belizean territory.

To avoid ceding territory to Guatemala, Price shifted tactics, and instead sought to internationalise the dispute, and draw international support to Belize's claim. In 1972, deputy prime minister C.L.B. Rogers toured the Middle East and Africa garnering support. Price and the PUP also secured the support of nations from the Commonwealth and the Non-Aligned Movement, and further sought to integrate itself internationally by becoming a founding member of the Caribbean Community (CARICOM). In 1975, Price took Belize's initiative to the United Nations (UN), and set up an office at the General Assembly headed by Shoman, which lobbied for successive resolutions to guarantee Belize's independence in 1981 with all of its territory intact. As Belize gained the support of the international community, barriers remained in Belize's lack of support amongst the nations of Latin America (aside from Cuba) and the United States, which backed Guatemala's right-wing military dictatorship as a bulwark against communism.

The momentum shifted towards Belize's position amongst the nations of Latin America when Price secured the support of Panamanian military leader Omar Torrijos in 1976. Torrijos promised to Panamanian military support to Belize and its backing in the case of an invasion, and went on to campaign for Belize's stance with other Latin American countries by referring to Price as the "José Martí of Belize", eventually flipping the support of Mexico, Venezuela, Argentina, and Peru. In 1979, with the fall of the Somoza dictatorship in Nicaragua, Honduras and El Salvador were left as the only countries in the region to not back Belize's claim.

=== Independence ===
The 1979 election was one of the last critical tests the Price-led PUP administration faced in achieving independence in 1981. It was largely expected that due to fatigue with successive PUP governments, the UDP could finally win an election. The election was also treated as a referendum on whether to pursue independence in 1981, as the UDP were in favor of delaying it until a British security guarantee could be assured. The election was the closest in regards to the popular vote that Belize had seen up until that point, although the PUP emerged with a stronger majority than before by one seat. With a mandate guaranteed until 1981, Price and the PUP were set to achieve Belizean independence.

In 1981 prior to the expected independence date, Belize hit a major flashpoint. Price, alongside ministers V.H. Courtenay and Assad Shoman, drafted up a document known as the "Heads of Agreement". The Heads of Agreement assured Belize's territorial sovereignty while compromising on certain things, such as allowing Guatemala to have access to the ports at Belize City and Punta Gorda, and use of the Ranguana and Sapodilla cayes. The Heads of Agreement was poorly received in Belize as it was perceived that the government had sold out to Guatemala, and led to mass social unrest including strikes and riots, ending in the government imposing a state of emergency and a country-wide curfew. After negotiations under the Heads of Agreement broke down, the British agreed to maintain a military presence in Belize after independence.

On 21 September 1981, Belize officially became an independent nation, and Price its first prime minister. The Belizean constitution had been ratified the day prior, and at midnight the British flag was lowered for the Belizean flag. Four days later, Belize became the 156th member of the UN. Addressing a national and international audience, Price kept his remarks on independence to only six minutes.

== Post-independence ==
=== First premiership ===
Following independence, Price's tenure as prime minister was dominated by concerns over the economy and budget. Belize sought to open itself up to foreign investment, with Price pitching the nation as a bridge between Central America and the Caribbean. Economic woes during Price's first term were compounded by the Guatemalan President Efraín Ríos Montt's refusal to negotiate under the Heads of Agreement and by deteriorating relations with the United States. Price refused to back the American invasion of Grenada in 1983, and the United States under Ronald Reagan began to supply Guatemala with more military aid to isolate the left-wing Sandanista government in Nicaragua. The Americans also disapproved of Price's willingness to keep socialists within his government.

Issues were further compounded by divisions within the PUP, with a reformist faction led by Said Musa, Assad Shoman and V.H. Courtenay, a conservative faction led by Louis Sylvestre and Fred Hunter. The opposition UDP attacked Price's association with the reformist faction and accused the three ministers, particularly Shoman, of seeking to turn Belize into a communist state.

During the 1984 election, the country's first after independence, economic woes alongside accusations of corruption in the Price administration resulted in the PUP finally losing to the rival UDP under Manuel Esquivel, ending Price's 23 year-long tenure as head of government in Belize. Price himself lost his Freetown constituency to rival Derek Aikman, who used new methods of campaigning, as opposed to Price who stuck to his traditional ways of door-to-door campaigning.

=== Opposition and second premiership ===
Price remained in charge of PUP during their period in opposition under the Esquivel government, while Florencio Marin became the Leader of the Opposition. Instead of challenging Aikman for the Freetown constituency, Price instead ran in the Pickstock constituency, held by his older sister Jane Ellen Usher. Capitalizing on notions that the UDP were arrogant and out-of-touch, as well as selling the country out the United States, Price led the PUP to a narrow victory in the 1989 election, becoming prime minister for a second time. He received personal congratulations from President Jimmy Carter following his victory.

Price's second term avoided reversing many of the policies implemented by the Esquivel government regarding increased privitisation, and instead adopted the liberal fiscal policy of the previous government. Diplomatically, Price's second term was marked by the establishment of full relations with Guatemala, and Guatemala's recognition of Belizean independence in 1991. New relations with Guatemala resulted in the Maritime Areas Bill, which extended Belize's territorial seas to 12 miles off the coast, except in the southern Toledo district near Guatemala, where it remained 3 miles. The bill had bipartisan support, although popular discontent from the UDP voter base resulted in Goldson splitting off to establish the National Alliance for Belizean Rights (NABR). Eventually the UDP acquiesced to their base's discontent with the bill, but the Price government managed to pass it nonetheless.

After the passage of the bill, Price's ministers Said Musa and Ralph Fonseca convinced him that with the PUPs success they should call a snap election, which was set for 1993. The snap election caught the UDP off-guard as they sought to mend ties with the NABR, but the PUP lost traction after the British announced they would remove their troops, in accordance with their agreement. Despite winning the popular vote, the PUP lost the election to the UDP, and Esquivel returned to the premiership over Price, breaking the PUP's hold over Belizean politics.

=== Later political career ===
In 1996, Price resigned as leader of the PUP, ending his 40-year tenure in charge of the party. His successor was expected to be one of Said Musa or Florencio Marin. While Price privately preferred Musa, he made no explicit endorsement. At the convention, Musa was elected over Marin, and became the leader of the PUP. Price remained as area representative for the Pickstock constituency until 2003.

== Ideology and political positions ==
Ideologically, Price was a populist and Belizean nationalist. His political positions and emphasis on social justice were heavily informed by his Catholic faith and by Catholic social teachings, and Price described himself as a Christian democrat. He never considered himself a socialist or communist, and actively tried to distance himself from being considered too left-wing despite his early associations with trade unions and the labour movement, and was occasionally deemed a communist by his critics. Instead, Price favored an economic policy that combined a centralised government alongside a private sector and foreign investment.

Price viewed Belize as a multicultural nation, and emphasized decentering the country's politics from Belize City and on campaigning into remote rural regions of the country. He viewed bilingualism as a core part of this strategy, with Belize positioned as an English-speaking country surrounded by Spanish-speaking ones. Price historically sought to connect Belize more to Central America than to the Caribbean, although he integrated Belize more into the Caribbean during his tenure.

== Personal life ==
Price never married, and never had any children. He was known for his humble personality and led a famously ascetic lifestyle, relying on few material comforts and stuck to the same routine of waking up at 5am and attending 6am mass at Holy Redeemer Cathedral every day. Despite the fact that efforts to reach out and connect to the Belizean public on a personal level was a cornerstone of his political strategy, Price had few close friends or associates besides his political allies, and was known for being very closed off regarding his personal life.

Price was bilingual, speaking both English and Spanish.

== Honours ==
In September 2000, Price became the first person to receive Belize's highest honour, the Order of the National Hero, for the prominent role he played in leading his country to independence. In 2000 he also received the Order of the Caribbean Community. In 2005 he was awarded Cuba's highest honour, the Order of José Martí by Cuban President Fidel Castro. He also received honours from Honduras, Mexico and Venezuela.

In 1982, he was made a member of the Privy Council of the United Kingdom. In 2003 a street in Belmopan was named George Price Boulevard and in 2012 the Western Highway was renamed the George Price Highway. The George Price Centre for Peace and Development is named after Price. The Centre was officially inaugurated in September 2002 and opened to the public in January 2004.

Since June 2025 an image of Price is featured on every $5, $20, and $100 Belize dollar banknote. In 2006 to celebrate 25 years since independence the Belize Postal Service released a commemorative stamp featuring Price.

In Belize, since 2021, the 15th of January, Price's birthday, is celebrated as a public holiday known as George Price Day. National Service Day is celebrated every 19 September to commemorate the anniversary of Price's death..

In 2024 a 16-foot bronze statue of Price was unveiled in Battlefield Park in Belize City.

== Death and funeral ==
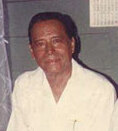
Price in his later years

"I look out at this great crowd of mourners today. I think of all those that have filed past the casket, signed the tribute books, lined the streets, and thronged the Cathedral on Saturday. And I know this is exactly the way it should be. Thousands of grateful Belizeans saying goodbye to the avatar of the nation. It is destiny fulfilled. What Mr Price strove for all his life, he has been able to produce in his death. We are now a country totally united. United in homage to our National Hero, and his creed of one Belize."

— Opening of the speech given by Dean Barrow at the state funeral.

On the 14 September 2011 Price fell at his home hitting his head on the floor which caused a blood clot on his brain. He was taken to hospital for emergency surgery and put into an induced coma. Price died a few days later on the morning of 19 September 2011, at the age of 92. Seven days of mourning was ordered and on 26 September 2011, a state funeral was held. Price was laid to rest at the Lord's Ridge Cemetery in Belize City.

== See also ==
- List of prime ministers of Belize
- Ministry of Finance (Belize)

Political offices
Preceded by office created	Prime Minister of Belize; 1981–1984	Succeeded by Manuel Esquivel
Preceded by Manuel Esquivel	Prime Minister of Belize; 1989–1993	Succeeded by Manuel Esquivel
Preceded by Leigh Richardson (acting)	Leader of the People's United Party; 1956–1996	Succeeded by Said Musa
