= 2024 Belizean municipal elections =

2024 Belizean local elections
← 2021	6 March 2024

All 9 Municipalities
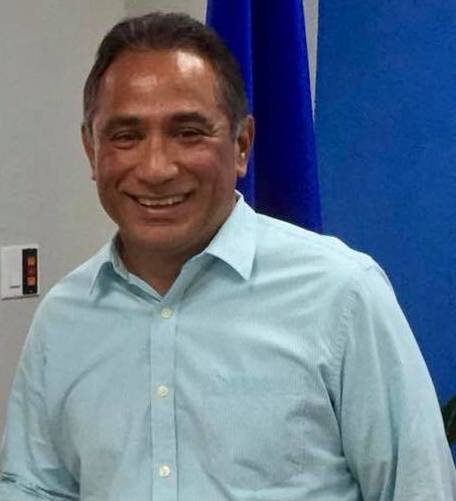

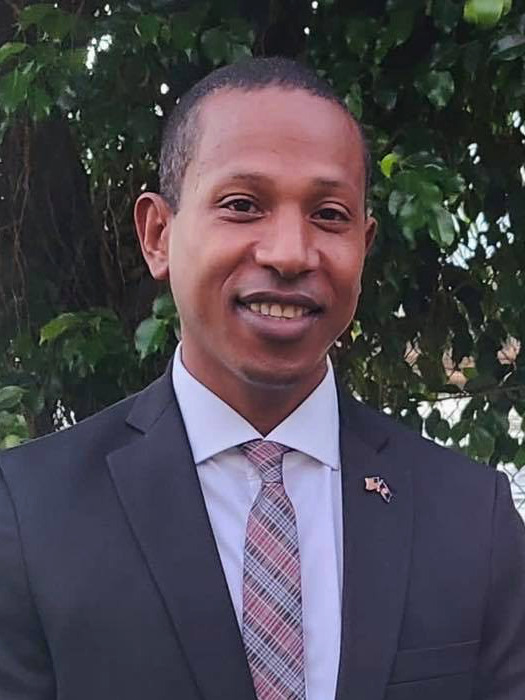
Leader	Johnny Briceño	Moses Barrow
Party	PUP	UDP
Leader since	31 January 2016	1 February 2022
Last election	65 municipal seats 9 municipalities	2 municipal seats 0 municipalities
Municipalities	8 / 9	1 / 9
Swing	▼1	▲1
Municipal seats	61 / 67	6 / 67
Swing	▼4	▲4
Popular vote	285,868	158,889
Percentage	63.2%	35.2%

Municipal elections were held in Belize on 6 March 2024. Local offices were elected, including the Mayor of Belize City and the City of Belmopan.

== Conduct ==
Elections took place across the eight towns and two cities in Belize; Punta Gorda, Dangriga, San Ignacio and Santa Elena, Benque Viejo del Carmen, Orange Walk Town, Corozal Town, San Pedro Town, Belmopan and Belize City.

163 candidates stood for the 67 seats available.

== Results ==
The People's United Party won the most seats over the opposition United Democratic Party.

Party	Votes	%
People's United Party	285,868	63.24
United Democratic Party	158,889	35.15
People's Democratic Party	5,282	1.17
Belize Progressive Party	1,033	0.23
Independents	958	0.21
Total	452,030	100.00
Source: ArcGIS Online

=== Full list ===
Province	Before	Elected
Belize City	People's United Party (11 seats)	People's United Party (11 seats)
Belmopan	People's United Party (7 seats)	People's United Party (7 seats)
Benque Viejo del Carmen	People's United Party (7 seats)	People's United Party (7 seats)
Corozal Town	People's United Party (7 seats)	People's United Party (7 seats)
Dangriga	People's United Party (7 seats)	People's United Party (7 seats)
Orange Walk Town	People's United Party (7 seats)	People's United Party (7 seats)
Punta Gorda	People's United Party (7 seats)	People's United Party (7 seats)
San Ignacio and Santa Elena	People's United Party (5 seats); United Democratic Party (2 seats)	United Democratic Party (6 seats); People's United Party (1 seat)
San Pedro Town	People's United Party (7 seats)	People's United Party (7 seats)

== See also ==
- Elections in Belize
