= Freetown (Belize House constituency) =

- Constituency for the Belize House of Representatives
- District: Belize
- Electorate: 4,592 (2015)
- Major settlements: Belize City (part)

Current constituency
- Created: 1961
- Party: People's United Party
- Area Representative: Francis Fonseca

Freetown is an electoral constituency in the Belize District represented in the House of Representatives of the National Assembly of Belize since 2003 by Francis Fonseca of the People's United Party. Fonseca served as PUP leader and Leader of the Opposition from 2011 to 2016.

== Profile ==
The Freetown constituency was created for the 1961 general election as part of a major nationwide redistricting. The constituency hugs the Caribbean Sea shoreline on the northwest outskirts of Belize City, also taking in some of the city center. It borders the Belize Rural Central, Lake Independence, Pickstock, Fort George and Caribbean Shores constituencies.

Freetown was represented by longtime People's United Party leader and Prime Minister George Cadle Price from 1961 to 1984, when he was upset by the United Democratic Party's Derek Aikman, a relative political newcomer. Aikman was one of two UDP area representatives who defected to the newly created National Alliance for Belizean Rights party in early 1992.

A by-election was held in January 1993 after Aikman was expelled from the House for bankruptcy. At that election the seat returned to PUP control.

== Area representatives ==
Election	Area representative	Party
1961	George Cadle Price	PUP
1965	George Cadle Price	PUP
1969	George Cadle Price	PUP
1974	George Cadle Price	PUP
1979	George Cadle Price	PUP
1984	Derek Aikman	UDP
1992	Derek Aikman	NABR
1993 by-election	Jorge Espat	PUP
1993	Jorge Espat	PUP
1998	Jorge Espat	PUP
2003	Francis Fonseca	PUP
2008	Francis Fonseca	PUP
2012	Francis Fonseca	PUP
2015	Francis Fonseca	PUP
2020	Francis Fonseca	PUP
2025	Francis Fonseca	PUP

== Elections ==
Election	Political result	Candidate	Party	Votes	%	±%
2025 general election Electorate: 4,055; Turnout: 2,421 (59.70%) −22.70	PUP hold Majority: 1,948 (80.46%) +42.88	Francis Fonseca	PUP	2,364	89.38	+20.59
2025 general election Electorate: 4,055; Turnout: 2,421 (59.70%) −22.70	PUP hold Majority: 1,948 (80.46%) +42.88	Abraham Flowers	UDP	16	8.92	−22.29
2020 general election Electorate: 3,782; Turnout: 3,114 (82.4%) +14.50	PUP hold Majority: 1,155 (37.58%) +32.58	Francis Fonseca	PUP	2,114	68.79	+13.25
2020 general election Electorate: 3,782; Turnout: 3,114 (82.4%) +14.50	PUP hold Majority: 1,155 (37.58%) +32.58	Orson Elrington	UDP	959	31.21	−10.91
2015 general election Electorate: 4,592; Turnout: 3,115 (67.84%) +5.21	PUP hold Majority: 365 (5.0%) +11.72	Francis Fonseca	PUP	1,777	55.54	+3.59
2015 general election Electorate: 4,592; Turnout: 3,115 (67.84%) +5.21	PUP hold Majority: 365 (5.0%) +11.72	Carla Barnett	UDP	1,312	42.12	−4.83
2015 general election Electorate: 4,592; Turnout: 3,115 (67.84%) +5.21	PUP hold Majority: 365 (5.0%) +11.72	Elizabeth Villanueva Dena	BPP	53	1.70	-
2012 general election Electorate: 4,230; Turnout: 2,031 (62.63%) −12.25	PUP hold Majority: 150 (5.0%) +4.42	Francis Fonseca	PUP	1,558	51.95	+2.37
2012 general election Electorate: 4,230; Turnout: 2,031 (62.63%) −12.25	PUP hold Majority: 150 (5.0%) +4.42	Lee Mark Chang	UDP	1,408	46.95	−2.05
2008 general election Electorate: 3,687; Turnout: 2,761 (74.88%) −1.82	PUP hold Majority: 16 (0.58%) −19.42	Francis Fonseca	PUP	1,369	49.58	−10.42
2008 general election Electorate: 3,687; Turnout: 2,761 (74.88%) −1.82	PUP hold Majority: 16 (0.58%) −19.42	Michael Peyrefitte	UDP	1,353	49.0	+9.0
2008 general election Electorate: 3,687; Turnout: 2,761 (74.88%) −1.82	PUP hold Majority: 16 (0.58%) −19.42	Jorge Ernesto "Prophet" Babb	NRTCP	19	0.69	-
2003 general election Electorate: 2,509; Turnout: 1,925 (76.7%) −12.69	PUP hold Majority: 383 (20.0%) −25.3	Francis Fonseca	PUP	1,154	60.0	−11.81
2003 general election Electorate: 2,509; Turnout: 1,925 (76.7%) −12.69	PUP hold Majority: 383 (20.0%) −25.3	Dough Singh	UDP	771	40.0	+13.49
1998 general election Electorate: 1,988; Turnout: 1,777 (89.39%) +17.78	PUP hold Majority: 805 (45.3%) +22.3	Jorge Espat	PUP	1,276	71.81	+10.31
1998 general election Electorate: 1,988; Turnout: 1,777 (89.39%) +17.78	PUP hold Majority: 805 (45.3%) +22.3	Marisa Marisol Quan	UDP	471	26.51	−11.99
1998 general election Electorate: 1,988; Turnout: 1,777 (89.39%) +17.78	PUP hold Majority: 805 (45.3%) +22.3	Abel J. Rodriguez	PDP	21	1.18	-
1993 general election Electorate: 2,758; Turnout: 1,975 (71.61%) +11.38	PUP hold Majority: 453 (23.0%) −18.43	Jorge Espat	PUP	1,214	61.5	−6.36
1993 general election Electorate: 2,758; Turnout: 1,975 (71.61%) +11.38	PUP hold Majority: 453 (23.0%) −18.43	Owen Morrison	UDP	761	38.5	+12.07
January 1993 by-election Electorate: 3,166; Turnout: 1,907 (60.23%) −2.71	PUP gain from NABR; Majority: 790 (41.43%) +31.23	Jorge Espat	PUP	1,294	67.86	+22.96
January 1993 by-election Electorate: 3,166; Turnout: 1,907 (60.23%) −2.71	PUP gain from NABR; Majority: 790 (41.43%) +31.23	Howell Longsworth	UDP	504	26.43	−28.67
January 1993 by-election Electorate: 3,166; Turnout: 1,907 (60.23%) −2.71	PUP gain from NABR; Majority: 790 (41.43%) +31.23	Adelma Broaster	NABR	102	5.35	-
1989 general election Electorate: 2,771; Turnout: 1,744 (62.94%) −5.49	UDP hold Majority: 178 (10.2%) −10.6	Derek Aikman	UDP	961	55.1	−4.4
1989 general election Electorate: 2,771; Turnout: 1,744 (62.94%) −5.49	UDP hold Majority: 178 (10.2%) −10.6	Araceli Krohn	PUP	783	44.9	+6.2
1984 general election Electorate: 2,151; Turnout: 1,472 (68.43%) −19.96	UDP gain from PUP; Majority: 306 (20.8%) +17.2	Derek Aikman	UDP	876	59.5	+11.6
1984 general election Electorate: 2,151; Turnout: 1,472 (68.43%) −19.96	UDP gain from PUP; Majority: 306 (20.8%) +17.2	George Cadle Price	PUP	570	38.7	−12.8
1979 general election Electorate: 3,576; Turnout: 3,161 (88.39%) +18.01	PUP hold Majority: 3.6% (−17.9)	George Cadle Price	PUP		51.5	−8.7
1979 general election Electorate: 3,576; Turnout: 3,161 (88.39%) +18.01	PUP hold Majority: 3.6% (−17.9)	Manuel Esquivel	UDP		47.9	+9.2
1974 general election Electorate: 2,242; Turnout: 1,578 (70.38%) −8.4	PUP hold Majority: 21.5% (+6.0)	George Cadle Price	PUP		60.2	+3.3
1974 general election Electorate: 2,242; Turnout: 1,578 (70.38%) −8.4	PUP hold Majority: 21.5% (+6.0)	Henry Fairweather	UDP		38.7	-
1969 general election Electorate: 1,951; Turnout: 1,537 (78.78%) +10.46	PUP hold Majority: 15.5% (−6.2)	George Cadle Price	PUP		56.9	−3.2
1969 general election Electorate: 1,951; Turnout: 1,537 (78.78%) +10.46	PUP hold Majority: 15.5% (−6.2)	Henry Fairweather	NIP		41.4	+3.0
1965 general election Electorate: 2,898; Turnout: 1,980 (68.32%) −19.52	PUP hold Majority: 21.7% (−20.6)	George Cadle Price	PUP		60.1	−7.0
1965 general election Electorate: 2,898; Turnout: 1,980 (68.32%) −19.52	PUP hold Majority: 21.7% (−20.6)	Tharine Rudon	NIP		38.4	+13.6
1961 general election Electorate: 1,850; Turnout: 1,625 (87.84%) n/a	PUP win Majority: 42.3% (n/a)	George Cadle Price	PUP		67.1	-
1961 general election Electorate: 1,850; Turnout: 1,625 (87.84%) n/a	PUP win Majority: 42.3% (n/a)	Sabino Savery	NIP		24.8	-
1961 general election Electorate: 1,850; Turnout: 1,625 (87.84%) n/a	PUP win Majority: 42.3% (n/a)	Ernest Cain	CDP		7.6	-

National Assembly of Belize
Preceded by (office established)	Constituency represented by the prime minister 1981–1984	Succeeded by Caribbean Shores
Preceded by Orange Walk Central	Constituency represented by the leader of the opposition 2011–present	Succeeded by incumbent
