= Derek Aikman =

Belizean politician (1959–2019)

Member of the Belize House of Representatives for Freetown
- In office 14 December 1984 – December 1992
- Preceded by: George Cadle Price
- Succeeded by: Jorge Espat

Personal details
- Born: 15 November 1959
- Died: 2 March 2019 (aged 59)
- Party: United Democratic Party; National Alliance for Belizean Rights (1992)

Derek Aikman (15 November 1959 – 2 March 2019) was a Belizean politician. He served in the Belize House of Representatives as an area representative for the Freetown constituency in the 1980s and early 1990s.

== Life ==
A relative political newcomer, Aikman was first elected to the Belize House as a member of the United Democratic Party in 1984, defeating sitting prime minister George Cadle Price in what was considered a major upset.

In opposition to the UDP-supported Maritime Areas Bill, along with Albert Area Rep. Philip Goldson Aikman joined the newly formed National Alliance for Belizean Rights in January 1992.

Aikman was declared bankrupt and expelled from the Belize House in December 1992, becoming the first Belizean area representative to leave office mid-term since independence. Eventually rejoining the UDP, Aikman attempted a political comeback in Fort George in 1998, but was soundly defeated by the incumbent, People's United Party leader Said Musa.

He died at the age of 59 on March 2, 2019.
