= Jorge Espat =

Belizean academic and politician

Member of the Belize House of Representatives for Freetown
- In office January 1993 – 5 March 2003
- Preceded by: Derek Aikman
- Succeeded by: Francis Fonseca

Personal details
- Born: 1959 (age 66–67) British Honduras (now Belize)
- Party: United Democratic Party; People's United Party (before 2013)
- Education: St. John's College; Fordham University; Viterbo University

Jorge Luis Espat (born September 10, 1959) is a Belizean academic and politician. Espat is a former member People's United Party area representative in the Belize House of Representatives. He served on the faculty of St. John's College in Belize City as an instructor and later as president.

== Political career ==
Espat was elected to the Belize House from Freetown in a January 1993 by-election. He was elected to a full term later in 1993 and re-elected in 1998. He served as a minister in the Said Musa government until resigning a few years later after alleging corruption within his own party. Espat was not a candidate for re-election in 2003.

Espat is famously known in Belize for claiming with regards to the PUP, "We are messed up!" In 2013 Espat joined the opposition United Democratic Party.

== Education ==
Espat attended Holy Redeemer Primary School followed by St. John's College, Belize City; Fordham University, New York City; and Viterbo University, La Crosse, Wisconsin.

Espat also served as vice principal of Excelsior High School from 1993 to 1995. Espat now teaches economics at Saint John's College Junior College in Belize City.

== Family ==
Espat is the brother of former PUP Albert Area Rep. Mark Espat. He is also cousin to the current area representative for the PUP Luke Espat.
