= Nicholas Pollard Sr. =

Belizean politician and trade union leader

Nicholas Anthony Ignatius Pollard Sr. (March 22, 1924 - January 21, 2003) was a Belizean politician and trade union leader.

He was born in 1924 in Bacalar, Quintana Roo, Mexico to Belizean parents, Stella Alberta Gill and Juanito Castro Pollard.

He was a founding member of the People's United Party (PUP) in 1950. The same year, he was elected president of the General Workers Union. He made major contributions to the development of the trade union movement in Belize.

On September 29, 1956, Pollard and nationalist leader George Cadle Price co-founded the Belize Times, now one of the largest newspapers in Belize.

In 1958, Pollard broke away from the PUP and formed the Christian Democratic Party of Belize (CDP). The CDP contested the 1961 elections, but the PUP won all 18 seats.

He served as Executive Secretary of the English-speaking Caribbean region of the Confederación Latino Americana de Sindicatos Cristianos (CLASC; also known in English as the Latin American Confederation of Christian Unionists) from 1961 to 1969. With the support of CLASC he founded the National Federation of Christian Trade Unions in Belize in 1962.

In the 1970s, Pollard left public life and worked in the private sector. He became an educator in the 1980s and 1990s.

He died in January 2003. He was married to Elizabeth Hoffman-Pollard, and the couple had twelve children. The first child was Nicholas Pollard, Jr. who became heavily involved in several national sports organizations.
