= Corozal United Front =

Political party in Belize

The Corozal United Front (CUF) was a short-lived political party active in Corozal District, Belize, in the 1970s. Shortly after its founding the party won a municipal election in Corozal Town, defeating the established People's United Party there for the first time. In conjunction with the newly formed United Democratic Party, the CUF fielded candidates in the 1974 Belizean general election, but failed to win any seats in the Belize House.

After the 1974 election, the CUF was absorbed by the UDP.
