= Francis Fonseca =

Belizean politician (born 1967)

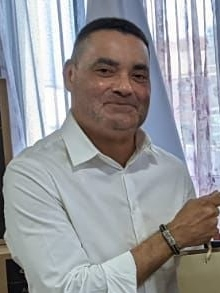
- Fonseca in 2022

Leader of the Opposition
- In office 3 November 2011 – 31 January 2016
- Monarch: Elizabeth II
- Governor General: Colville Young
- Prime Minister: Dean Barrow
- Preceded by: Johnny Briceño
- Succeeded by: Johnny Briceño

Member of the Belize House of Representatives for Freetown
- Incumbent
- Assumed office 5 March 2003
- Preceded by: Jorge Espat

Personal details
- Born: Francis William Fonseca Belize City, British Honduras (now Belize)
- Party: People's United Party
- Education: St. John's College; University of Southwestern Louisiana; University of the West Indies

Francis William Fonseca is a Belizean politician who has served as Minister for Foreign Affairs, Foreign Trade, Education, Culture, Science and Technology since 2024. He served as leader of the People's United Party (PUP) and as Leader of the Opposition of Belize from 2011 to 2016.

== Early life and education ==
Fonseca attended St. John's College in Belize City and the University of Southwestern Louisiana, where he received a bachelor's degree in economics. In 1994, Fonseca received a law degree from the University of the West Indies. He is a cousin of former PUP Representative Ralph Fonseca, who also served in the Musa Cabinet.

== Career ==
Fonseca was first elected to the Belize House of Representatives from the Belize City-based Freetown constituency in 2003. He served as Attorney General and Minister of Education, Culture and Labour in Prime Minister Said Musa's cabinet until February 2008, when the PUP lost the general election to the opposition United Democratic Party (UDP). Fonseca was one of only six PUP representatives nationwide to retain his seat in the National Assembly in the 2008 election.

Following the election defeat and subsequent resignation of Musa from the PUP leadership in March 2008, the party held a convention to select its new leader. Fonseca was a candidate for the party leadership at this convention, and he was considered to be the candidate preferred by the party establishment, but he was defeated by Johnny Briceño, receiving 310 votes against 330 for Briceño. Fonseca successfully contested the PUP leadership in 2011 after Briceño's resignation. He led the party in the 2012 election, in which it was narrowly defeated.

A National Convention was called on for January 31, 2016. Three candidates ran for the position, Orange Walk Central representative, Hon. Johnny Briceño, recently elected Lake Independence representative, Cordel Hyde and Freetown incumbent, Francis Fonseca contested it again although his announcement of retirement from politics.

Following the November 2020 General Election in Belize in which the People's United Party was successful, Francis Fonseca was appointed as Minister of Education, Culture Science and Technology in the Cabinet of Prime Minister Johnny Briceño. He is currently serving as Minister for Foreign Affairs and Foreign Trade, having replaced Eamon Courtenay in 2024.

=== Chinese sanctions ===
On 12 October 2026, the Chinese Foreign Ministry announced to place sanctions on Francis Fonseca, which stated he have been "anti-China" in pushing for their nations ‌to maintain diplomatic ties with Taiwan. Under the sanctions, Fonseca was banned from entering China (including Hong Kong and Macau), and prohibiting Chinese organizations and individuals from engaging in transactions, cooperation or other activities.
