= 2021 Belizean municipal elections =

2021 Belizean local elections
- 3 March 2021

All 9 Municipalities
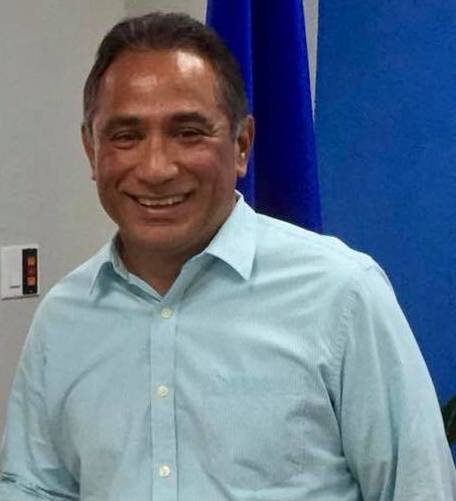

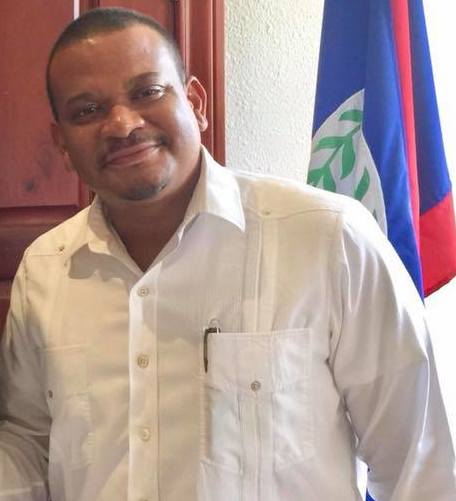
Leader	Johnny Briceño	Patrick Faber
Party	PUP	UDP
Leader since	31 January 2016	12 July 2020
Last election	26 municipal seats 3 municipalities	41 municipal seats 6 municipalities
Swing	▲	▼
Municipalities	9 / 9	0 / 9
Municipal Corporations +/–	▲6	▼6
Municipal seats	65 / 67	2 / 67
Municipal seats +/–	▲38	▼38

Municipal elections were held in Belize on 3 March 2021. Voters elected a total 67 representatives. This includes a mayor in each of the nine communities, 42 town councils and 16 city councillors (ten in Belize City and six in Belmopan). This election saw another historic consecutive landslide victory for the People's United Party which won all 9 municipalities and 65 of the 67 municipal seats with the United Democratic Party (UDP) losing 38 municipal seats and only managing to hold on to two. This election took place a few months after the PUP's historic 2020 Belizean general election victory.

In 2018, the UDP won 41 seats, with the PUP picking up the remaining 26. The PUP gained complete council control of Belize City and Corozal Town, picked up a council seat in Dangriga, and regained complete control of the Orange Walk Town council.

== Participating parties ==
The following parties contested the election:

- United Democratic Party
- People's United Party
- Belize Progressive Party
- Belize People's Front
- United Upliftment Party

== Results ==
Summary of the 3 March 2021 Belizean Municipal Election
Party	Candidates	2018 Counselors	2021 Counselors	+/-	2018 Mayors	2021 Mayors	+/-
UDP	67	35	1	-34	6	1	-5
PUP	67	23	57	+34	3	8	+5
BPP	10	0	0	-	0	0	-
BPF	3	0	0	-	0	0	-
UWP	1	0	0	-	0	0	-
Ind.	12	0	0	-	0	0	-
Total	160	58	58	-	9	9	-

=== Towns ===
- Benque Viejo del Carmen: PUP wins town council 6-0.
- Corozal Town: PUP wins town council 6-0.
- Dangriga: PUP wins town council 6-0.
- Orange Walk Town: PUP wins town council 6-0.
- Punta Gorda: PUP wins town council 6-0.
- San Ignacio/Santa Elena: PUP wins town council 4-2.
- San Pedro Town: PUP wins town council 6-0.
