= 1993–94 Belizean municipal elections =

A series of municipal elections were held in Belize within a period of twelve months in 1993–94, sandwiching a general election.

== Results ==
- 1993: Belize City Council election (March 18): Then ruling People's United Party win all nine seats and their second straight BCC victory. This election result combined with events in Guatemala emboldened the PUP to call general elections on June 1, 1993, which they lost to the United Democratic Party (Belize)/National Alliance for Belizean Rights coalition.
- 1994: National town board elections (March): The now ruling United Democratic Party win the majority of seats nationwide in their greatest municipal victory to date, although would lose the Belize City Council. This performance was eventually surpassed by those in 2006.
