= Heads of Agreement =

Heads of Agreement may refer to:

- Heads of agreement (law), a generally non-binding document, unless otherwise stated, outlining the main issues relevant to a tentative (partnership or other) agreement, prior to a full contract being drafted.
- Heads of Agreement (1981), a document proposing a solution to the Guatemalan claim to Belizean territory, whose rejection caused a security crisis in Belize
