= October 1974 general election =

October 1974 general election may refer to:

- 1974 Belizean general election
- 1974 Botswana general election
- 1974 Kenyan general election
- 1974 Northern Territory general election
- October 1974 United Kingdom general election
- 1974 Yukon general election
