= The Belize Times =

- Front page of the January 15, 2017 edition
- Type: Weekly newspaper
- Format: Tabloid
- Owner(s): People's United Party
- Editor: Alberto Vellos
- Founded: 1956
- Political alignment: People's United Party
- Headquarters: Independence Hall, 3 Queen Street, Belize City, Belize, Central America
- Circulation: about 20,000
- Website: Belize Times website

The Belize Times is a Belizean newspaper published once a week and the official organ of the People's United Party (PUP). It was established in 1956 and sells for BZ$1

Its offices are located at the PUP's Belize City headquarters at 3 Queen Street, Belize City. As of August 2006, it has published over 4,500 issues, making it the longest continuously published newspaper in Belize since 1950.

Its motto is "The Truth Shall Make You Free", a shortened form of Bible verse John 8:32: "And ye shall know the truth, and the truth shall make you free." (King James Version)

== Staff ==
- Editor: Alberto Vellos
- Publishers: Kevin L. Arthurs and Kareem Musa (BT Publishing)
- Desktop Publisher: Christopher Williams
- Office Assistant: Roberto Peryfitte

== History ==
The Times began publishing in 1956 under the patronage of then leader George Price, who had just ousted ten members of the PUP from its central committee, including Philip Goldson, owner and editor of the Belize Billboard.

For much of the 1980s the newspaper was presented as The Sunday Times; it resumed printing under the Belize Times moniker in the 1990s.

Longtime columnist Emory King died in August 2007. King's column officially ceased with the 19 August 2007 issue of the Times.

== Editorial policy ==
As the official organ of the PUP, The Belize Times is consistently critical of policies supported by the opposition United Democratic Party. As a result, the Times has been involved in several lawsuits and controversies. Though the major political parties rarely sue each other over accusations printed in the other's newspaper, allegations have at times become serious enough to warrant a response.

The Times has also gained a reputation for its support for the arts through its weekly reviews of many Belizean artists.

=== 2006 libel controversy ===
The Belize Times answered to a libel suit in the Supreme Court, filed by attorney Lois Young and her former husband, then-Leader of the Opposition Dean Barrow over articles printed in the newspaper in October 2006 which they claimed defamed Barrow. Chief Justice Abdulai Conteh issued an injunction, which the Times appealed.

On 9 November 2006, Conteh lifted the injunction and set the case for January 2007.

In February 2007, Conteh ruled against the Times and set damages at BZ$40,000, the third highest award (including lawyer fees and costs) in Belizean legal history. The Times will consider an appeal, and in its Friday issue for that week continued to proclaim its innocence and accuse other media houses of unfair treatment of PUP public figures, which it says approaches libel.

== Sections of newspaper ==
- Headlines
- Top national news stories
- Editorials (official editorial, "hard-hitting" and "outspoken" guest editorials)
- Seniors Column (compilation of columns from Emory King and "Aunt" Grace Coleman)
- Feature articles and international news
- Classified ads
- Sports
