= Heads of Agreement (1981) =

The Heads of Agreement was a 1981 document proposing a solution to the Guatemalan claim to Belizean territory. Created in February and signed on 11 March 1981 in London, the agreement sought to propose future basis for negotiations between the United Kingdom, Belize and Guatemala over the dispute. The document's rejection created a national security crisis in Belize in March and April 1981.

== Background ==
Guatemala, Belize's neighbour to the west and south, had held a claim to Belize's territory since 1859. The claim stemmed from a treaty between Guatemala and Great Britain which Guatemala interpreted as a conditional cession treaty, in which it would be given access to the Caribbean coastline by road in exchange for dropping the claim. Guatemala already has Caribbean access, outside of the disputed region.

Guatemala asserted its claim repeatedly in the period between 1940 and 1981, occasionally threatening to invade, but backing down when faced with UK military reinforcements. Several attempts to mediate the dispute failed. Meanwhile, people of Guatemalan descent were settling in Belize, both legally and illegally.

Beginning in 1975, the dispute was discussed at the United Nations. The UN general assembly voted in 1980 to affirm the sovereignty of Belize and called on the UK and Guatemala to reach a compromise and grant Belize independence before the end of the next GA session in 1981.

== Clauses ==
1. The United Kingdom and Guatemala shall recognize the independent state of Belize as an integral part of Central America, and respect its sovereignty and territorial integrity in accordance with its existing and traditional frontiers subject, in the case of Guatemala, to the completion of the treaties necessary to give effect to these Heads of Agreement.
2. Guatemala shall be accorded such territorial seas as shall ensure permanent and unimpeded access to the high seas, together with its rights over the seabed thereunder.
3. Guatemala shall have the use and enjoyment of the Ranguana and Sapodilla Cayes, and rights in those areas of the sea adjacent to the Cayes, as may be agreed.
4. Guatemala shall be entitled to free port facilities in Belize City and Punta Gorda.
5. The road from Belize City to the Guatemalan frontier shall be improved; a road from Punta Gorda to the Guatemalan frontier shall be completed. Guatemala shall have freedom of transit on these roads.
6. Belize shall facilitate the construction of oil pipelines between Guatemala and Belize City, Dangriga and Punta Gorda.
7. In areas to be agreed, an agreement shall be concluded between Belize and Guatemala for purposes concerned with the control of pollution, navigation and fishing.
8. There shall be areas of the seabed and the continental shelf to be agreed for the joint exploration and exploitation of minerals and hydrocarbons.
9. Belize and Guatemala shall agree upon certain development projects of mutual benefit.
10. Belize shall be entitled to any free port facilities in Guatemala to match similar facilities provided to Guatemala in Belize.
11. Belize and Guatemala shall sign a treaty of cooperation in matters of security of mutual concern, and neither shall permit its territory to be used to support subversion against the other.
12. Except as foreseen in these Heads of Agreement, nothing in these provisions shall prejudice any rights or interests of Belize or of the Belizean people.
13. The United Kingdom and Guatemala shall enter into agreements designed to reestablish full and normal relations between them.
14. The United Kingdom and Guatemala shall take the necessary action to sponsor the membership of Belize in the United Nations, the Organization of American States, Central American organizations and other international organizations.
15. A joint Commission shall be established between Belize, Guatemala and the United Kingdom to work out details to give effect to the above provisions. It will prepare a treaty or treaties for signature by the signatories to these Heads of Agreement.
16. The controversy between the United Kingdom and Guatemala over the territory of Belize shall therefore be honorably and finally ended.

== Reception in Belize ==
Public reaction in Belize was muted at first, but the Public Service Union promptly denounced the agreement as a giveaway and promised strike action. The government's pleas that nothing had actually been agreed upon were ignored. Another group responsible for the anti-Heads reaction was the Belize Action Movement, a youth movement featuring young people who saw the need to fight to ensure that Belize did not fall into the hands of Guatemala. The BAM and PSU coordinated a nationwide strike and protest on 20 March.

Also central to the movement was the detention of students from the Belize Technical College, led by Socorro Bobadilla. Bobadilla was a key figure in denouncing the plan, and she and six other students were expelled from Technical by its principal, who acted under the direction of Said Musa. For much of the remainder of March, there were school closings, daily protests and in one case, the death of an individual in Corozal. Another memorable occurrence was the burning down of several buildings in the downtown area of Belize City. During this melee, Policeman and musician Kent Matthews was accidentally shot by a colleague.

The Governor declared a state of emergency on 3 April. Subsequent attempts to use the Heads as a blueprint failed, and Belize would become independent on 21 September 1981.

== Failed negotiations ==
With the subsiding of the March and April riots, negotiations began on 20 May 1981 in New York. Belizean ministers C. L. B. Rogers, V. H. Courtenay and Assad Shoman represented Belize. The opposition United Democratic Party, claiming that they had been ignored and insulted, refused to attend. This first round of negotiations yielded no results.

A second round began in early July after the UDP met with British Foreign Secretary Nicholas Ridley. Again there was no clear settlement and the British resolved to grant Belize independence and agree to defend the territory. The proclamation for Belize's independence was signed on 26 July 1981, coming into force on 21 September 1981.

== See also ==
- History of Belize
- History of Guatemala
