= Yasser Musa =

Artist

- Born: 17 July 1970 (age 55); Belize City, British Honduras (now Belize)
- Occupations: Teacher, Visual Artist, Poet, Publisher
- Known for: Landings, The Belize City Poem, Zero, New Belizean Art, Container Collection
- Website: www.yassermusa.com

Yasser Musa (born 17 July 1970) is a Belizean visual artist, teacher, poet and publisher.

== Background ==
The son of former Belizean Prime Minister Said Musa, Yasser Musa was born in Belize City. He was educated in Belize City at St. John's College Junior College. After he graduated in 1989, he debuted with a collection called poems. In 1992, along with Belizean musician and now owner of Belize's most successful record company Stonetree Records, Ivan Duran, Musa presented Minus 8. It featured multimedia pieces and was the first of its kind in Belize. He went on to study at a university in New Orleans. There in 1995 he presented his first solo visual art exhibit, Coming Out, with 50 paintings.

In 1995, Yasser Musa developed the Image Factory Art Foundation. The Art Foundation features a gallery which hosts exhibits from local, regional and international artists. The Factory, as most people call it, is located on 91 North Front Street in Belize City, and has functioned as a space for workshops, classes, residencies and exhibits.

== landings ==
The Minus series would later go counting down to a major international exhibit ZERO, new Belizean art which opened in the Olimpo in Mérida Yucatán, to a large crowd and would eventually garner 17,000 visitors. landings was a series of exhibits, ten in all, which featured artists from the Caribbean and Central America. The exhibits mostly featured installation and photography. Each exhibit was launched with a forum for artists and audience to discuss the current situation of contemporary art in the region. Yasser Musa along with landings curator Joan Duran, editors Tristan Donald and Marisol Rodriguez at the close of the last exhibit began the vigorous work of the CONTAINER Collection, the first of a series of 10 manifested as a 400-page book. On September 6, 2013, along with Joan Duran and Kency Cornejo, Musa launched the CONTAINER Collection 001. The last landings presentation was in 2010.

== Exhibitions ==
Musa has participated in several exhibitions both individually and collectively. He has exhibited in Belize, Cuba, México, Taiwan, Costa Rica, Portugal, Spain, the Dominican Republic and the United States.

- Belize @ 31 in Iowa, Bing Davis Memorial Gallery, Iowa, US, 2012
- el Fleco+Vixens, Bitches and Whores, Image Factory Art Foundation, Belize City, Belize, 2011
- landings 10, mi-kunuku-farm, Benque Viejo del Carmen, Belize, 2009
- YM@20 yrs, Image Factory, Belize City, Belize, 2009
- landings 9, Image Factory Art Foundation, Belize City, Belize, 2008
- landings 8, Taipei Fine Arts Museum, Taipei, Taiwan, 2008
- landings 7, Casa de las Americas/Galería Hayddée Santamaría, La Habana, Cuba, 2007
- landings 6, Casa de las Americas/Galería Latinoamericana, La Habana, Cuba, 2007
- landings 5, Art Museum of the Americas, Washington D.C., U.S.A., 2007
- landings 4, Museo de Arte Contemporáneo, San José, Costa Rica, 2007
- landings 3, Centro León, Santiago de los Caballeros, la República Dominicana, 2006
- landings 2, Centro de Arte Visuales, Mérida, Yucatán, México, 2006
- landings 1, Conkal Arte Contemporáneo, Conkal, Yucatán, México, 2004 (3)
- North Front Street Project, 9th Havana Biennial, La Habana, Cuba, 2006
- Zero, New Belizean Art, Mérida, Yucatán, México, 2000
- Minus 5, Contemporary Arts Center, New Orleans, 1995
- Coming Out, Image Factory Art Foundation, Belize City, Belize, 1995
- Minus 8, Bliss Institute, Belize City, Belize, August, 1992

== Poetry ==
Yasser Musa has published works of poetry:

- How to Receive a Gift, 2011
- Limited Anxiety, 2010
- Loose Electricity, 2009
- The Miami Poem, 2000
- The Belize City Poem, 1996
- Poems, 1989
