= George Price Centre for Peace and Development =

Non-profit in Belize

The George Price Centre for Peace and Development is a not-for-profit/non-governmental organization, established in 2000 through the collaborative effort of a group of admirers in honor of the Right Honorable George Cadle Price, P.C. (January 15, 1919 – September 19, 2011) - Belize’s first Prime Minister and National Hero. The Centre was officially inaugurated on September 21, 2002 and opened to the public on January 15, 2004. It is located on Price Centre Road in Belmopan, Belize.

== Functions of the George Price Centre ==
The Centre functions as:

- a museum
- a resource/educational centre and library
- a training centre
- a cultural centre
- a business centre
