= 1974 Belizean general election =

- 30 October 1974

All 18 seats in the House of Representatives 10 seats needed for a majority
- Registered: 33,737
- Turnout: 70.58% (▼4.45pp)
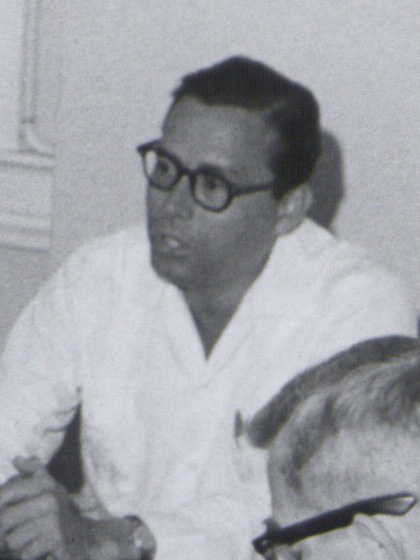
	First party	Second party
		UDP
Leader	George Cadle Price	Dean Lindo
Party	PUP	UDP
Leader since	1956	1974
Leader's seat	Freetown	Ran in Fort George
Last election	58.85%, 17 seats	Did not exist
Seats won	12	6
Seat change	▼5	New
Popular vote	12,269	9,069
Percentage	52.66%	38.93%
Swing	▼6.19 pp	New
- Popular vote by constituency. As Belize uses the FPTP electoral system, seat totals are not determined by popular vote, but instead via results by each constituency
Premier before election
George Cadle Price
PUP
Elected Premier
George Cadle Price
PUP

General elections were in Belize on 30 October 1974. Belizeans elected 18 members to the House of Representatives. The elections were the first since the country was officially renamed from British Honduras in 1973.

The ruling People's United Party (PUP) won the largest share (12) of seats in the elections. The United Democratic Party – formed the previous year by a merger of the National Independence Party, People's Development Movement and Liberal Party – ran for the first time in this election, winning six seats. The UDP fielded candidates nationwide except in Corozal District, where it supported candidates from the Corozal United Front. The UDP absorbed the CUF after the election.

== Results ==
Party	Votes	%	Seats	+/–
People's United Party	12,269	52.66	12	–5
United Democratic Party	9,069	38.93	6	+5
Corozal United Front	1,039	4.46	0	New
United Black Association for Development	89	0.38	0	0
Independents	832	3.57	0	0
Total	23,298	100.00	18	0
Valid votes	23,298	97.85		
Invalid/blank votes	513	2.15		
Total votes	23,811	100.00		
Registered voters/turnout	33,737	70.58		
Source: Elections and Boundaries Department
