= 1996–97 Belizean municipal elections =

A series of local government elections were held in Belize in 1996–97. They were held respectively on March 18, 1996 for the Belize city municipal seats and March 11, 1997.

== Information ==
In the Belize City Council election of 1996 the People's United Party, then in opposition, swept all nine seats from the ruling United Democratic Party. One year later, they snatched 46 of 49 seats in town board elections, sweeping every town except for San Ignacio, where they took four seats.
