= United Black Association for Development =

- Leader: Lionel Clarke; Evan X Hyde
- Founded: 9 February 1969
- Dissolved: 8 February 1974
- Merged into: United Democratic Party (partial)
- Newspaper: Amandala
- Ideology: Black Power

United Black Association for Development (UBAD) was a cultural and political party established in Belize in February 1969 and based on traditional Black Power tenets.

== Background ==
The nation of Belize (or, as it was then called, British Honduras), was in a state of flux. Hurricane Hattie had set the nation back decades since its arrival onshore on 30 October 1961, and started the trend of migration by Belizeans to the United States and elsewhere to find work and educational opportunities, occasionally sending money home to those left behind. The ruling People's United Party (PUP), well removed from its heyday in the early 1950s, was concentrating on the development of the country as a whole and not necessarily Belize City, its largest municipality. The Opposition National Independence Party mainly subscribed to colonial tenets and argued that the nation needed a more gradual approach to development.

St. John's College, then as now considered one of Belize's finest educational institutions, had turned out graduates from its Sixth Form (now St. John's College School of Liberal Arts) since 1964. Its 1966 class included a middle-class Creole named Evan Anthony Hyde. Hyde received a scholarship to attend a prestigious Ivy League university in the United States, Dartmouth College in Hanover, New Hampshire. After spending two years in Hanover, Hyde returned with a B.A. in English and immediately accepted a job teaching literature courses at another legendary institution, Belize Technical College, now part of the University of Belize. These courses, taught mainly at the Bliss Institute (now Bliss Center for Performing Arts), provided the seed for the Association.

== Formation and early activities ==
UBAD was officially established on 9 February 1969 in Belize City. Its first president was Lionel Clarke; Hyde was officially secretary. The group met every Wednesday night to discuss tactics for the development of the young nation and soon attracted a following. After Clarke resigned following charges of inappropriate conduct at his place of employment, Hyde was elevated to president, where he remained for the rest of UBAD's existence. Another early UBAD contributor was Edgar X. Richardson.

UBAD organised a breakfast program for needy children, in which its female supporters would get up early and cook for children transported to the UBAD headquarters on, appropriately enough, Hyde's Lane. In conjunction with this program, a bakery called UBAFU (Garifuna word meaning power) was also established, selling locally made bread and pastries until it closed down for lack of financing. The breakfast program suffered a similar fate when its chief transport personnel was deported by order of the government and UBAD lost its vehicle for transportation. UBAD also found itself under fire from many of the established groups uncomfortable with its message of Black Power; the local unit of the Universal Negro Improvement Association (UNIA) stopped renting them its Liberty Hall in August 1969 under pressure from the government.

The newly formed PAC under Assad Shoman and Said Musa sought camaraderie with UBAD and officers of both parties spoke at each other's meetings. Unfortunately, taunts of "communism" and "racism" were soon hurled at UBAD and President Hyde was forced to suspend an executive member for appearing at a PAC meeting with a flag of Cuban/Argentinian activist Che Guevara. In addition, upwardly mobile blacks were not drawn to UBAD's youthful defiance and insistence on African origin as the basis for self-empowerment. Women were similarly sidelined, although a few eventually became executive members. (Shoman, 13 Chapters)

One of the lasting institutions set up in this period was the Amandala newspaper founded in August 1969. As of 2015 Amandala remains a major Belizean news outlet.

== The RAM merger ==
In October 1969, UBAD and PAC merged to form the Revolutionary (Revolitical) Action Movement (RAM) at Rockville on the Western Highway. Hyde retained the presidency. He claimed that UBAD was becoming a fad among certain elements and his job was to show the Belizean people how to make vital changes in Belizean society so as to obtain real equality. He went on to criticise the ruling PUP government, attacking its policies as "politricks" and ridiculing the idea of "Christian Democracy" as espoused by its leader George Price. (X-Communication)

Neither major political party at the time, PUP or NIP, felt comfortable with UBAD. Price spoke with the leaders of RAM and agreed that their concerns were important, but that they were going about it the wrong way and that RAM would best join the PUP in the struggle for independence, which RAM was not prepared to do; other PUP supporters were much less forgiving. On the part of the NIP, a pressure group called CIVIC openly challenged RAM's leaders to appear on its rostrum, and when they accepted the invitation a fight ensued. Truth be told, RAM considered both parties to be similar and both representative of an oppressive system. Shoman recalls holding up a parrot at a UBAD meeting in April 1969, in the midst of the City Council campaign; he said Belize City voters were better off voting for the parrot, a representative of the parties' mimicking the policies of the imperialists.

RAM officers told members of the NIP and new party the PDM that they could not possibly win general elections called for December 5, 1969. The advice was ignored and the NIPDM lost 17-1.

However, RAM itself was in upheaval, and by February 1970 had broken apart over policy disputes, Hyde's established popularity in the black-dominated Belize City and the inability to persuade Belizeans that RAM was not UBAD in disguise.

== From movement to party and regression ==
UBAD returned, defiant as ever, in 1970 with an article in Amandala entitled "Games Old People Play" which lampooned a petition heard in the Supreme Court over the 1969 election results. Hyde and editor Ismail Shabazz were charged for sedition in March and acquitted after trial in July. Less than two weeks later, the UBAD movement had metamorphosed into a political party, the UBAD party for Freedom, Justice and Equality (abbreviated for this article as PFJE), established on July 22, the anniversary of the 1919 post-World War I riot in Belize City.

The PFJE continued to speak to the people and lobby for representation in government, but it suffered a setback in 1971 when a coalition of NIP and UBAD candidates lost the Belize City Council election (the NIP had never won a City election) and three of its supporters were arrested after riots during the "Pan African Liberation Week" celebrations on May 29, 1972.

The PFJE lost further momentum in 1973 when half its executive voted to join the newly formed United Democratic Party (UDP) over Hyde's objections, precipitating a rift between Hyde and the UDP that persists to this day. Early in 1974, Hyde announced his intention to run in the Belize City-based Collet constituency in elections scheduled for later that year. He posted 89 votes, running third behind the PUP and the UDP candidate, but caused the margin of victory to swing to the PUP by one vote and cost the UDP one of the three seats that might have deadlocked the House. Hyde subsequently dissolved UBAD in a column in the Amandala of November 8, 1974, entitled a "Farewell to Arms".

== UBAD's legacy ==
Amandala alone of UBAD's institutions survived 1974, and eventually created two others, KREM Radio and Krem Television, keeping the information link alive.

Hyde certainly seems to think so. In an editorial review celebrating UBAD's anniversary on 8 February 1991, Hyde argued that Belize's usual "five-year cycle" of politics reduced his party to nothing more than an accessory; he also noted the diversity of its members and policies, which he says "was one of our attractions for young people but it was also the source of major structural weaknesses which doomed us...." (Amandala). However, he insists that UBAD's vision was "relevant" and "alive" and concluded that UBAD had in fact triumphed.

Colleague Assad Shoman has a slightly different view. He agrees that Belizeans today are "maybe" more black and proud than in the 1960s, but marginally so, citing the popularity of "Malcolm X" products among black youth who have been taught little or nothing about the man himself. But he also insists that as much as UBAD was about Africa, it was also about bringing power to the people, and this has not happened. UBAD, PAC and RAM, Shoman claims, failed to unite themselves and the people under their respective banners, and opened themselves to counter-charges of racism that were not true and exploited the nation's diversity for political gain. He concludes that UBAD was not immediately successful but did offer a new view on Belize's proposed development.

UBAD returned in 1994 as the UBAD Educational Foundation, with Hyde as Chair. The UEF currently runs the Library for African and Indian Studies out of the Partridge street compound, facilitates regular visits by African scholars and recently held a Black Summit meant to discuss problems of blacks in Belize. The UEF is also a part of the Central American Black Organization (CABO) along with the World Garifuna Organization (WGO) under Theodore Aranda.
