= Battlefield Park =

Park in Belize

Coordinates: 17.494074°N 88.187109°W

Battlefield Park is a park in the center of Belize City, Belize. The park has served as the preferred meeting place of Belize's inhabitants since 1638. Labour activist Antonio Soberanis Gómez' Labour and Unemployed Association got its start there, as did the People's United Party. In memory of that, a bust of Soberanis Gómez sits in the park. Today the park is used for meetings and concerts and is a popular place of refuge for homeless people.

The park is in the centre of the capital's shopping district. It sits opposite the Supreme Court of Belize, whose green and white clapboard building dates from 1926.
