= 1979 Belizean general election =

- 21 November 1979

All 18 seats in the House of Representatives 10 seats needed for a majority
- Registered: 50,091
- Turnout: 89.78% (▲19.20pp)
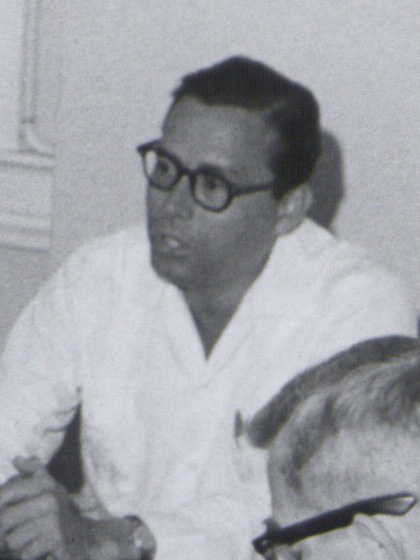
| | First party | Second party |
|---|---|---|
| | | UDP |
| Leader | George Cadle Price | Dean Lindo |
| Party | PUP | UDP |
| Last election | 52.66%, 12 seats | 38.93%, 6 seats |
| Seats won | 13 | 5 |
| Seat change | ▲1 | ▼1 |
| Popular vote | 23,309 | 21,045 |
| Percentage | 52.44% | 47.35% |
| Swing | ▼0.26 pp | ▲8.47 pp |
- Results by constituency
Premier before election
George Cadle Price
PUP
Elected Premier
George Cadle Price
PUP

General elections were held in Belize, then a self-governing British Crown colony, on 21 November 1979. The result was a victory for the ruling People's United Party, which ran on a platform of seeking independence from Britain as soon as possible; it won 13 of the 18 seats, giving it a mandate for independence.

== Background ==
Belize had been a crown colony of Britain, named British Honduras, since 1862. In 1964, it was granted full self-governance.

In 1978, a new voter registration system was implemented, including a Voter Identification Card, the voting age was lowered to 18, and the Election and Boundaries Commission was established; this election was the first after these developments.

The People's United Party (PUP) went into the election with a 13–5 majority, having picked up a seat after the previous election when Toledo District Area Representative Vicente Choco crossed the floor from the opposition United Democratic Party (UDP) in 1975. The PUP ran on a platform of seeking independence as soon as possible, while its main rival, the UDP, wanted to delay it pending a resolution of the Guatemalan claim to the colony.

== Results ==
Voter turnout was nearly 90%. Although the popular vote total was close, the PUP won 13 of the 18 seats, enabling George Cadle Price to retain the office of Premier of Belize and giving him a mandate for independence (which was achieved less than two years later, on 21 September 1981). Price, the leader of the PUP, won the Freetown constituency by defeating Manuel Esquivel 1628 to 1514. The PUP's percentage of the vote temporarily halted the party's declining hold on the voters, but in 1984 the decline resumed, and it suffered its first election defeat in thirty years.

| Party | Votes | % | Seats | +/– |
|---|---|---|---|---|
| People's United Party | 23,309 | 52.44 | 13 | +1 |
| United Democratic Party | 21,045 | 47.35 | 5 | –1 |
| Toledo Progressive Party | 96 | 0.22 | 0 | New |
| Total | 44,450 | 100.00 | 18 | 0 |
| Valid votes | 44,450 | 98.84 | | |
| Invalid/blank votes | 521 | 1.16 | | |
| Total votes | 44,971 | 100.00 | | |
| Registered voters/turnout | 50,091 | 89.78 | | |
Source: Elections and Boundaries Department
