= General Workers' Union (Belize) =

The General Workers' Union (GWU) was a general union in Belize.

== History ==
The union was founded in 1939 by Antonio Soberanis Gómez, as the British Honduras Workers and Tradesmen's Union. In 1934, he had formed the Unemployed Brigade, followed by the Labourers' and Unemployed Association, but both had dissolved. This new organisation was the first in the country to describe itself as a trade union. In 1943, new legislation permitted trade unions to register with the government, and what was soon renamed the General Workers' Union was the first to do so.

The Belize Billboard newspaper was founded in 1946, and initially championed the GWU. In 1947 it led a strike of sawmill workers at the Belize Estate and Produce Company, which succeeded in obtaining pay increases. By 1948, the union had 5,000 members. That year, its president, Clifford Betson, gave a speech in favour of socialism, to which the Billboard objected.

In 1950, the union absorbed the small Mercantile Clerks' Union. That year, Nicholas Pollard defeated Betson as president of the union, and its leadership gradually became shared with that of the People's United Party. Alongside the party, the GWU played an important role in the anticolonial movement, and it led a general strike in 1952, which was largely aimed at supporting the party. The strike weakened the union's finances. However, it maintained its links with the party, and for the 1954 British Honduras general election, it selected the PUP's five candidates for seats outside Belize City, four of which were won.

In 1955, there was a dispute within the union over whether Pollard, by then general secretary, has misused funds donated by the Brotherhood of Sleeping Car Porters, intended to support victims of Hurricane Janet. This led Pollard, in 1956, to resign from the union, and establish the rival Christian Democratic Union. This was accompanied by a split in the PUP, with the GWU siding with the new Honduran Independence Party.

In 1960, the union absorbed the British Honduras Development Union, renaming itself as the British Honduras General Workers' Development Union. In 1979, it merged with the Southern Christian Union, to form the United General Workers Union.
