= Philip Goldson =

Belizean politician

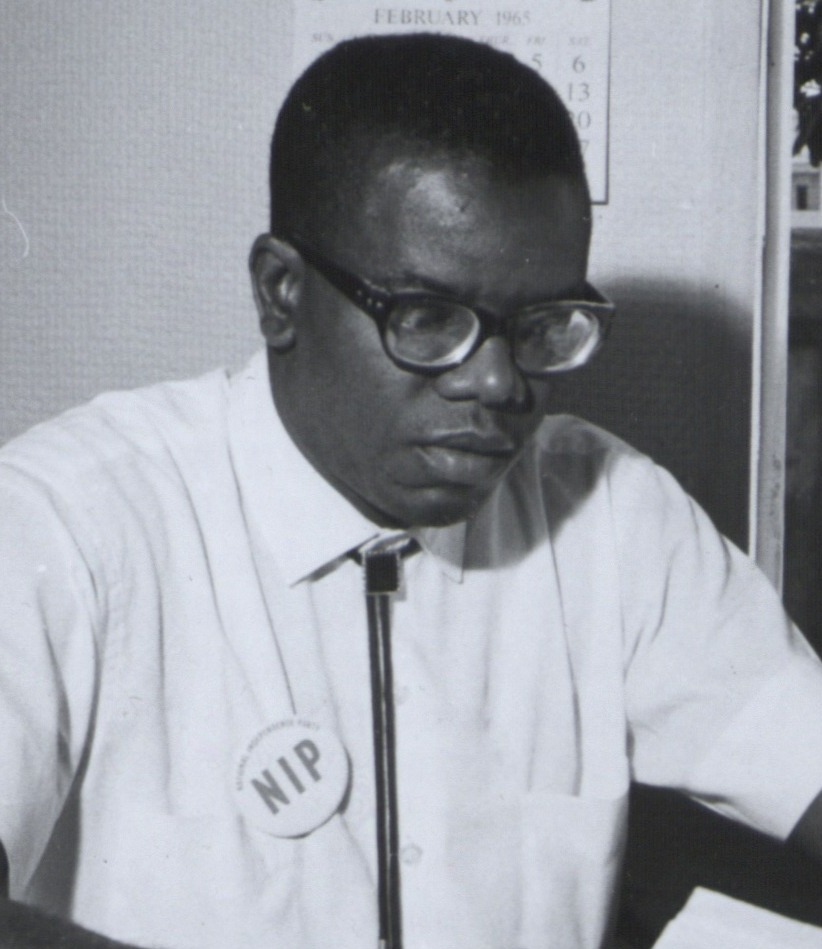
- Goldson in 1965

Member of the Belize House of Representatives for Albert
- In office 1 March 1965 – 27 August 1998
- Preceded by: Frederick Westby
- Succeeded by: Mark Espat

Member of the British Honduras Legislative Assembly for Belize South
- In office 28 April 1954 – 20 March 1957
- Preceded by: (constituency created)
- Succeeded by: Denbeigh Jeffrey

Personal details
- Born: Philip Stanley Wilberforce Goldson; 25 July 1923 Belize City, British Honduras (now Belize)
- Died: 3 October 2001 (aged 78) New York City, United States
- Party: National Alliance for Belizean Rights (1992–1998); United Democratic Party (1973–1992); National Independence Party (1958–1973); Honduran Independence Party (1956–1958); People's United Party (1950–1956)

Philip Stanley Wilberforce Goldson (25 July 1923 – 3 October 2001) was a Belizean newspaper editor, activist and politician. He served in the House of Representatives of Belize as member for the Albert constituency from 1965 to 1998 and twice as a minister. Goldson was a founding member of both of Belize's current major political parties, the People's United Party (PUP) in the 1950s and the United Democratic Party (UDP) in the 1970s. He was also the leading spokesman of the hardline anti-Guatemalan territorial claims National Alliance for Belizean Rights party in the 1990s.

== Early life and education ==
Goldson was born in Belize City to Peter Edward Goldson and Florence Babb and attended St. Mary's Primary School. Although he never had an opportunity to go to a secondary school, he studied at night and succeeded in obtaining the Cambridge University Overseas Junior Certificate in 1939 and the Senior School Certificate in 1941. For much of the early 1940s he participated in the Open Forum movement featuring George Price and Leigh Richardson as well as older activists such as Clifford Betson and Antonio Soberanis. However, his main job was as editor of the Belize Billboard, which he took up in 1941.

== Participation in the nationalist movement ==
From 1941 to 1947, Goldson worked in the British Honduras Civil Service, at the same time he started his journalism career doing editing work at the Civil Service Chronicle. With the advent of the nationalist movement, he wrote news items for the Belize Billboard. The plight of the workers in Belize led him into trade unionism. He became the national organizer of The General Workers’ Union in 1949, later becoming its general secretary.

In 1950, Belize's first major political party, the PUP, was formed under George Price as leader. Goldson was named assistant secretary, working under Price. He continued to edit the Belize Billboard and kept it running as a daily newspaper until its offices were destroyed in the late 1960s.

In 1951 both Goldson and Richardson were convicted of "seditious intention" based on an extract from the Belize Billboard, which stated, "There are two roads to self government (Independence). Evolution and Revolution. We are now trying evolution." The colonial government held that the words imputed intention to try revolution if evolution did not succeed. Both Goldson and Richardson were sentenced to one year of hard labour. While in prison he taught his fellow inmates to read and write. Prior to going to jail for his ideals Goldson won a seat to the Belize City Council and had served as vice-president (Deputy Mayor) until his conviction.

In 1954 Goldson won a seat in the newly created British Honduras Legislative Assembly, where he was appointed member (quasi-Minister) for Social Services. His portfolio included Labour, Housing and Planning, Health, Education and Social Welfare and Community Development. During this period he coordinated the building of Corozal Town after its destruction in 1955 by Hurricane Janet.

Goldson pioneered the village council system, enacted a new education ordinance making primary education free, granting government assistance to secondary schools for the first time and initiated special allowance for retired teachers who up to then did not enjoy pension benefits, confirmed Belize as contributing member of the U.W.I., also established Department of Housing and Planning with Henry C. Fairweather as its first Director and Town Planner, and revised Government Workers Rules establishing the check-off system for trade unions.

== Days in opposition ==
In 1956, Goldson resigned from the PUP along with nine others, citing Price's ambitious moves within the party hierarchy. Goldson would serve the rest of his political career in opposition to Price and the PUP.

Soon after Goldson joined Richardson under the Honduran Independence Party banner and contested the 1957 election unsuccessfully, losing his seat to the PUP candidate. Goldson was not a candidate for the Legislative Assembly in 1961, but in 1965 won the Belize City-based Albert constituency as leader of the National Independence Party. This began his role as the long-running member of the Opposition; from 1961 to 1974 he sat in the House alone (he was appointed after the NIP lost all eighteen seats to the PUP in 1961 elections), joined only by Edwin Morey from 1965 to 1969, and remained in opposition until the PUP lost elections in 1984.

Goldson, according to historian Assad Shoman, singlehandedly kept the two party system in Belize alive at a time when citizens distrusted the PUP and ignored the NIP. Goldson, however, eventually left to pursue a law degree in London, returning in 1974 after the formation of the UDP.

After Theodore Aranda was deposed as leader of the UDP in 1982, Goldson ran unsuccessfully against Manuel Esquivel for the post of UDP leader, but won a Ministership in 1984. In the 1984 elections he not only won his seat but also celebrated the first victory of his party (UDP). He was appointed Minister of Social Services and Community Development from 1984 to 1986, then Minister of Labour and Social Services from 1986 to 1989 and Minister of Human Resources, Youth Development and Womem’s Affairs since 1989.

As Minister he established the Family Court, the Belize City Urban Department, the Department of Women's Affairs, the District Councils, and the Disabilities Service Division.

== Second life with the NABR ==
Upon the occasion of the Maritime Areas Act's passage in 1991, Goldson led a group of politicians away to start the National Alliance for Belizean Rights (NABR). He charged that the PUP and UDP had hijacked politics in Belize for themselves and pledged to fight Belize's cause. Despite his retirement, on January 13, 1992, he was instrumental in the formation of the National Alliance for Belizean Rights (NABR). Goldson retired from the Belize House after the 1998 election.

== Personal life ==
Goldson married Hadie Jones on April 28, 1954, the same day as his first election. Together they had five children: Phillip, Dale, Adrian, Karen-Anne, Ann Margaret. Goldson had glaucoma and was blind after 1978. In 1986 he was elected president of the Caribbean Association of the Disabled. In early 1972, Mr. Goldson went to London to study law, and Mrs. Goldson took their children to New York City. When Mr. Goldson returned to Belize in the summer of 1974, Mrs. Goldson and their children remained in New York. Mr. Goldson began pursuing a law degree in 1974 at the age of 51. He was eventually admitted to Lincoln's Inn in London. Thereafter, Ms. Emma Boiton entered Mr. Goldson's life and would be considered his life partner and his "Political wife" and were together for over 25 years. The union produced a daughter, Florence. Mr. Philip's faithful companion was Ms. Boiton and they raised their daughter, Florence and two other children from Ms. Boiton's previous relationships together. Mrs. Hadie Goldson and Mr. Goldson resumed a life together in Belmopan some years before he died.

== Legacy ==
In 1989, the Belizean government renamed the country's international airport outside Belize City the Philip S. W. Goldson International Airport. In September 2001, shortly before his death, Goldson was awarded the Order of Belize. In September 2008, Goldson was posthumously awarded the country's highest honour, the Order of the National Hero.
