= National Alliance for Belizean Rights =

- Leader: Philip Goldson (de facto)
- Founded: 27 January 1992
- Dissolved: 1998
- Split from: United Democratic Party
- Newspaper: Alliance Weekly
- Ideology: anti-Guatemalan territorial claims

The National Alliance for Belizean Rights (NABR), formed as the Patriotic Alliance for Territorial Integrity, was a political party in Belize in the 1990s. The party colour was forest green.

== History ==
=== Formation ===
In September 1991, Guatemala, after nearly two centuries of denying the right of Belize to exist, seemed to recognize Belize as a sovereign nation. As part of the new harmony between the nations, a draft Maritime Areas Bill was introduced in the House in November 1991, limiting Belize's coastal rights in the far south and guaranteeing Guatemala access to the sea. Both major political parties, the People's United Party (PUP) and United Democratic Party (UDP), supported the measure as a way of ending the claim. Leader of the Opposition Manuel Esquivel and UDP Deputy Leader Dean Barrow toured the country with sitting prime minister George Price in bipartisan support of the bill.

However, certain elements in the UDP, led by longtime Albert Area Rep. Phillip Goldson, refused to grant Guatemala any concessions without an explicit dropping of the claim, and broke away in 1992 to form the NABR. Other notable defections included Freetown Area Rep. Derek Aikman and former Area Rep. and Attorney General Hubert Elrington. Observers thought the UDP had lost credibility in allowing its elder statesman, Goldson, and these up-and-comers to leave the party. The Patriotic Alliance for Territorial Integrity was formed on 1 December 1991 to respond to the Maritime Areas Act formulated to solve the Guatemalan claim to Belizean territory.

The PATI dissolved into the National Alliance for Belizean Rights on 27 January 1992. In the Alliance Weekly's first issue on 11 March 1992 (the Alliance was an NABR newspaper), the NABR claimed that a third party was needed because the major parties were corrupted from top to bottom, ignored ordinary Belizeans and intended to turn the country into a "two-party political dictatorship".

In late 1992 Aikman was declared bankrupt and expelled from the House, triggering a by-election in Freetown. This gave the NABR the chance to win its first election when the by-election took place in January 1993. However its candidate, Adelma Broaster, finished a distant third. In the city council elections in March the party also failed to win a seat.

A frustrated Goldson began to draw ire from Belizeans used to solutions for getting out of troubles such as these. So when old foe Price surprised observers by calling elections early in June 1993, the NABR jumped at the chance to reunite with the UDP. The UDP-NABR coalition received fewer votes than the PUP, but won a majority of seats – 16 to the PUP's 14. Of the sixteen seats, fifteen were taken by the UDP and one (Goldson in Albert) by the NABR, giving the party its first and ultimately only elected area representative. Goldson received a cabinet post and the NABR demanded that the now Maritime Areas Act be repealed.

=== In government ===
The NABR found that its views were in the minority in the 1993–98 UDP-led Esquivel government. With Aikman out of office and Elrington having rejoined the UDP prior to regaining his former seat in Lake Independence in 1993, Goldson struggled on alone. Included among the NABR's setbacks were the UDP's refusal to repeal the MAA, the resurgence of the claim as a result, and Goldson's troubles as Minister of Immigration, when a passport scandal was uncovered in 1995 and 1996. Goldson – who was in declining health by that time – stood down in 1998, having never lost an election in Albert. The men who had originally joined him, Aikman and Elrington, both ran under the UDP banner in 1998 but lost badly in that year's PUP landslide victory.

Goldson never recovered from the NABR years. While Belizeans still revered him, his health deteriorated further and he died in October 2001.

=== Decline ===
Despite Goldson's retirement and its other notable members reconciled with the UDP by 1998, the NABR struggled on. They ran alone in the 1998 elections but received only 174 votes nationwide, or 0.21% of the total. The party became effectively defunct after the election.
