= Assad Shoman =

Belizean diplomat, lawyer and historian

Minister of Foreign Affairs
- In office 2003–2006

Personal details
- Born: 13 February 1943; Belize City, Belize
- Political party: People’s United Party (formerly)
- Education: St John's College; Hull University; Sussex University (M.A.); University of London (PhD)

Assad Shoman (born 13 February 1943) is a Belizean diplomat, lawyer, historian, and former government minister. He currently serves as a leader of the Belizean delegation to the International Court of Justice (ICJ) for the purpose of resolving the longstanding territorial dispute between Guatemala and Belize.

== Early life and education ==
Shoman was born in Belize City to a Belizean-Palestinian family. He attended St John's College in Belize City before moving to England to obtain a law degree from Hull University. Shoman also holds a master's degree in International Relations from Sussex University and a PhD in History from the University of London.

== Early activism ==
Shoman began his engagement with politics in Belize in the late 1960s. Returning to Belize after completing his law degree, Shoman participated in a protest against the Vietnam War film The Green Berets, starring John Wayne on New Year's Day 1969. The group who planned the protest, the Ad Hoc Committee for the Truth About Vietnam, included other radical Belizeans such as Evan X Hyde and future Prime Minister Said Musa.

In May 1969, Shoman and Musa formed the People's Action Committee (PAC), an organization that “condemned capitalism and racism, demanded the right for every person to work, to social security and to a fair wage.” PAC was labeled a communist organization by its critics. PAC merged with Hyde's United Black Association for Development (UBAD) briefly in October 1969 to form the Revolutionary Action Movement (RAM), an organization that, in Hyde's (its president's) words, was about "taking power in this society and making vital changes so as to obtain true freedom, justice and equality."

RAM was labeled a communist organization by the People’s United Party and dissolved itself in February 1970 due to disagreements over strategy. Shoman, who had been Vice President of RAM, quietly resigned in February 1970 to work as a lawyer in private practice.

== Political career ==
Shoman joined the People's United Party (PUP) in the early 1970s and held positions as Attorney General and Minister of Economic Development after the PUP won the 1974 elections. He worked closely with leader George Price through the 1970s to lobby key international actors with the goal of achieving Belizean independence. He was ultimately successful in 1981.

He served in government again as Minister of Foreign Affairs for the PUP between 2003 and 2006. Shoman has since broken with the PUP and remains officially politically unaffiliated.

His diplomatic career includes ambassadorships to Mexico, the United Kingdom, Cuba, and the European Union. He co-founded the Society for the Promotion of Education and Research (SPEAR).

== Writing career ==
Shoman has been called "Belize's most important living historian" for his historical works, including Thirteen Chapters of a History of Belize - the first history of Belize written by a Belizean. He has authored a total of seven books.
