= Dean Lindo =

Belizean attorney and politician

Member of the Belize House of Representatives for Fort George
- In office 14 December 1984 – 4 September 1989
- Preceded by: Said Musa
- Succeeded by: Said Musa

Member of the Belize House of Representatives for Fort George
- In office 30 October 1974 – 21 November 1979
- Preceded by: Alexander Hunter
- Succeeded by: Said Musa

Personal details
- Born: Dean Russel Lindo; 4 September 1932 Belize City, British Honduras (now Belize)
- Died: 17 September 2018 (aged 86) Belize City, Belize
- Party: United Democratic Party
- Education: New York University; Durham University

Dean Russel Lindo (4 September 1932 – 17 September 2018) was a Belizean attorney and politician. He was one of the principal founders of the United Democratic Party in 1973 and served as its first leader from 1974 to 1979.

== Biography ==
Lindo was born on 4 September 1932 in Belize. He was a graduate of New York University and Durham University in England. He was a member of the Honourable Society of Lincoln's Inn and practiced law in Belize beginning in 1964.

Lindo first ran for the Belize House in the Belize City-based Fort George constituency as a member of the National Independence Party in 1969, but lost to the People's United Party incumbent, Alexander Hunter. Lindo was elected from Fort George in 1974, defeating PUP nominee Said Musa by 46 votes.

In 1979, Lindo lost his seat to Musa by a margin of 71 votes and was succeeded as UDP leader by Theodore Aranda.

Lindo regained the Fort George seat in 1984, defeating Musa by a margin of 57 votes, but lost again to Musa in the 1989 election by a margin of 449 votes. After a stint as the Belizean ambassador to the United States, he subsequently left active politics. In his later years he maintained a law office in Belize City and acted as a consultant to the UDP.

== Family ==
Lindo is the maternal uncle of former UDP leader and Prime Minister Dean Barrow., and the paternal great-uncle of rapper and politician Moses Barrow (born Jamal Michael Barrow), better known as Shyne.

== Death ==
Lindo died at his Belize City home on 17 September 2018. A funeral service was held at St. John's Cathedral in Belize City on 24 September.
