= Antonio Soberanis Gómez =

Belizean activist

Antonio Soberanis Gómez (January 14, 1897 – April 14, 1975) was an activist in the Belizean labour movement. He founded the Labour and Unemployed Association in 1934 to demand poverty relief work and a minimum wage. He was jailed for sedition in 1935.

== Personal life ==
Antonio Soberanis was born to Mexican parents in the Belizean village of San Antonio Rio Hondo in Orange Walk. His family had moved to Belize in 1894.

He attended boys' school in Belize City and thereafter became a barber. He owned "The Panama Barbershop," originally located on Handyside Street and then Queen Street in Belize City, which hosted many political discussions until it was boycotted in 1932 due to his political activities. He fathered ten children, first to Violet Garbutt married.

== Days of the LUA ==
The decline of the mahogany trade, the Great Depression and the 1931 hurricane created terrible living conditions for the working class in British Honduras around 1934-35. With 1,800 registered unemployed in the country, an organization called the Unemployed Brigade demonstrated for more work and better pay. After meeting with colonial Governor Harold Baxter Kittermaster, the governor offered 80 more jobs and a feeding program of "rice lab" (a porridge of sugar and boiled rice) and bread cooked in the washing pots. Many leaders of the Unemployed Brigade gave up hope and resigned. Soberanis called them cowards. He said he would continue fighting for the cause and was not afraid to die. In his most famous quote, he said, "I'd rather be a dead hero than a living coward." With his colleagues, he formed the Labor and Unemployed Association (LUA) which organized many boycotts, demonstrations and pickets against large merchants such as the B.E.C. (Belize Estate and Produce Company), John Harley and Co., Hofius and Hilderbrant, Melhado and Sons, and Brodies. The LUA held large demonstrations at the Battlefield Park, directly in front of the courthouse. At the meetings Soberanis campaigned for work for the unemployed and spoke against the Government. He also traveled to Dangriga and Corozal Town to encourage support for the cause of higher wages outside Belize City.

On 1 October 1934, Soberanis organised the first labour strike at the B.E.C. sawmill. It turned into a riot, and the police arrested 17 people. When he went to post bail for those arrested at the strike, he was himself arrested. The police refused to grant him bail and held him for 35 days, which weakened the LUA and caused many other LUA leaders to leave the group. He replaced them and continued his activism. In 1935 the Government passed several new laws, including one banning criticism. When he made a speech in Corozal Town in October 1935 calling the large merchant stores "bloodsuckers" and the Governor and the King "crooks," he was arrested again. He was charged with sedition, but was released after paying a BZ$25 fine.

The efforts of the LUA yielded some good results: the wages of grapefruit dock workers in Dangriga were raised from 8 cents to 25 cents an hour; more men were employed to work on the Northern Highway following the receipt of a BZ$250,000 grant; and partial representation was granted to the elected officers in the Legislative Council. In addition, the LUA operated their own food program by organizing fundraising activities and collecting gifts from merchants and sympathizers who were not followers. They also operated a medical wing called the Red and Green Nurses, named after the colours of the LUA. The Nurses, headed by Cristobel Usher, dispensed free medical care to LUA members.

== Ending of the LUA ==
The LUA movement was short-lived as there was infighting, leading to a split in the leadership. Soberanis's political activities continued up until 1942, when he left Belize to serve the British military in Panama. In 1950 the movement handed over their political followers to the newly formed People's Committee, now the People's United Party, and Soberanis became a councilor of the party.

At the age of 78, Soberanis died and was buried at his farm in Santana Village.
