= Said Musa =

Prime Minister of Belize from 1998 to 2008

The Right Honourable Said Musa
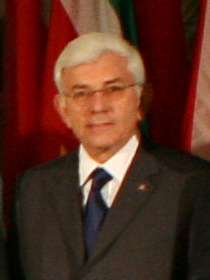
- Said Musa in 2007

3rd Prime Minister of Belize
- In office 28 August 1998 – 8 February 2008
- Monarch: Elizabeth II
- Governor-General: Colville Young
- Deputy: Johnny Briceño; Juan Vildo Marin
- Preceded by: Manuel Esquivel
- Succeeded by: Dean Barrow

Leader of the Opposition
- In office 8 February 2008 – 30 March 2008
- Monarch: Elizabeth II
- Governor-General: Colville Young
- Prime Minister: Dean Barrow
- Preceded by: Dean Barrow
- Succeeded by: Johnny Briceño
- In office 10 November 1996 – 30 August 1998
- Monarch: Elizabeth II
- Governor-General: Colville Young
- Prime Minister: Manuel Esquivel
- Preceded by: George Cadle Price
- Succeeded by: Dean Barrow

Member of the Belize House of Representatives for Fort George
- In office 4 September 1989 – 12 November 2020
- Preceded by: Dean Lindo
- Succeeded by: Henry Usher
- In office 21 November 1979 – 14 December 1984
- Preceded by: Dean Lindo
- Succeeded by: Dean Lindo

Personal details
- Born: Said Wilbert Musa; 19 March 1944 (age 82) San Ignacio, British Honduras (now Belize)
- Party: People's United Party
- Spouse: Joan Musa
- Profession: Lawyer

Said Wilbert Musa (/sɑːˈiːd ˈmuːsɑː/, born 19 March 1944) is a Belizean lawyer and politician. He was the third prime minister of Belize from 28 August 1998 to 8 February 2008.

== Early life and education ==
Said Wilbert Musa was born in 1944 in San Ignacio in the Cayo District of what was then British Honduras. He was the fourth of eight children by Aurora Musa, (née Gibbs), and Hamid Musa, a Palestinian immigrant from Al-Bireh. Hamid Musa was also involved in politics, running for the British Honduras Legislative Assembly as a National Party candidate in the 1957 general elections.

As a boy, Musa attended Saint Andrew's Primary School in San Ignacio. He then attended high school at St Michael's College in Belize City and later St John's College Sixth Form. While living in Belize City, Said Musa aided his parents by selling tamales and other Belizean delicacies. After completing secondary school he then studied law at the University of Manchester in England, receiving an Honours Degree in Law in 1966, and then qualified as a barrister at Gray's Inn. He returned to Belize the following year, serving as crown counsel and then going into private practice. Said Musa has significantly contributed to law in Belize by representing thousands of underprivileged and poor individuals who come into contact with the law.

== Political career ==
Musa first came to notoriety in the late 1960s when he co-founded the Ad Hoc Committee for the Truth About Vietnam with Assad Shoman to protest the Vietnam War in British Honduras. On 1 January 1969 the group protested a showing of the American film The Green Berets in Belize City, which it characterized as pro-war propaganda.

Musa joined the People's United Party (PUP) under George Cadle Price in 1970. He soon became a leader of the party's socialist wing in 1974. He ran for the Belize House of Representatives for the first time in 1974 in the eastern Belize City-based Fort George constituency, but was narrowly defeated by United Democratic Party and Opposition Leader Dean Lindo by 46 votes. Musa was appointed to the Belize Senate for the ensuing term, until 1979.

Musa was successful in the next general election, held in 1979, winning the Fort George seat and defeating Lindo by a margin of 71 votes. Musa served as Attorney General and Minister of Education, Sports and Culture in the 1979–1984 Price-led government. Musa also served on the committee that wrote the 1981 Constitution of Belize.

Musa defended Belize's large national debt, mostly incurred in the 1980s, by saying Keynesian economics was being used: "The economy was in a deep recession, the country was broke (due to hurricanes) therefore it had to get the private sector moving again. The country started a major expansionary program ... to pay for the program we took on a lot of debt."

In the 1984 election, Musa was defeated for re-election by Lindo, losing by a margin of 57 votes this time. He regained the Fort George seat in the 1989 election, defeating Lindo again by 449 votes. He has won the Fort George constituency in every election since. Under Price, Musa was Minister of Foreign Affairs and Education from 1989 to 1993.

As of July 2016 Musa has contested 10 consecutive general elections in Fort George and has continuously served as his party's standard bearer in the same constituency for over 40 years, longer than anyone else in Belizean history. (Price was a standard bearer for 49 years, but in three different constituencies). He also trails only Price and Philip Goldson in total time served in the Belize House. Musa is the only current Area Representative to serve in the Belize House before the country's full independence from Great Britain in September 1981.

=== Leader of the People's United Party and Prime Minister of Belize ===
Musa was elected and took over leadership of the PUP upon Price's retirement from party leadership in 1996, defeating Price's longtime lieutenant Florencio Marin in the leadership election in 1996. Musa then led the PUP to landslide election victories in 1998 and 2003.

Musa led Belize to significant growth over his near-decade long term in office, but his popularity declined during his last years in office due in part to increasing public perception of corruption among his Cabinet and within his party. He was also accused of abandoning his previous socialist stances in favour of neoliberal policies as prime minister.

Outside of Belize Musa chaired several regional organisations, including CARICOM and the Central American Integration System (SICA).

Musa again led the PUP in the election held on 7 February 2008, but the PUP suffered a severe defeat at the hands of the UDP, led by Dean Barrow winning only six out of 31 seats. Musa himself was re-elected in the Fort George constituency. UDP leader Dean Barrow succeeded Musa and was sworn in as 4th prime minister of Belize by Governor-General of Belize, Colville Young on 8 February 2008.

=== Post-leadership ===
On the day of the 2008 election, Musa stated it would be his last election as PUP leader. After the PUP's defeat, he congratulated Barrow. He considered the opposition's focus on allegations of corruption and negativity from the media to be primary factors in the defeat.

On 13 February 2008, Musa announced that he was stepping down as party leader so that the PUP could "renew itself from the top." The PUP held a convention on 30 March 2008 to select his successor, and Johnny Briceño was elected as PUP leader against Francis Fonseca.

A leadership election was held in October 2011 again where, Francis Fonseca defeated Briceno. Briceño was replaced by Francis Fonseca in October 2011. Five months later the Fonseca-led PUP suffered a narrow defeat to the UDP, winning 14 of 31 seats in the Belize House of Representatives. Musa was comfortably re-elected in his Fort George constituency and remains the senior member and shadow Senior Minister of the PUP caucus and in the Shadow Cabinet which was formed first in 2012 and then again in 2015. The current Shadow Cabinet of Francis Fonseca will be dissolved before the Next Belizean general election which is scheduled for 13 February 2020.

=== 2015 and beyond ===
In 2015 the 71-year-old Musa was the subject of rumours of possible retirement from public life due to health concerns and a perceived negative impact on future PUP electoral prospects nationwide. However, Musa dismissed the rumours and stated his retirement from the Belize House was not imminent. In March 2015 Musa told Tropical Vision Limited that he would "more than likely" run for an eighth and final term in the 2015 election, which he won.

Although eligible to stand in an 11th consecutive general election, Musa stood down at the 2020 Belizean general election. The PUP nominated his son Henry Charles Usher to stand in his place in Fort George Constituency. He won the seat in the election.

== Family ==
Musa is married to Joan Musa. His son, Yasser Musa, is an artist, teacher, poet and entertainer in Belize and headed its arts council, the National Institute of Culture and History (NICH) under the PUP administration in addition to serving as chief of public relations for the PUP. Another son, Kareem, recently returned to Belize with a law degree and has taken on a number of prominent cases recently.

In what was considered an upset, Kareem Musa defeated Belize City mayor and UDP nominee Darrell Bradley for the House seat in the Caribbean Shores constituency in the November 2015 election, becoming the first Belizean area representative to simultaneously serve with his father.

Musa and his wife Joan also have three other sons, Mark Musa (a doctor), Said Musa Jr and David Musa. He also has seven children outside his marriage.

== See also ==
- Politics of Belize
- Ministry of Finance (Belize)

Assembly seats
| Preceded by Dean Lindo | Member of the Belize House of Representatives for Fort George; 1979–1984 | Succeeded by Dean Lindo |
| Preceded by Dean Lindo | Member of the Belize House of Representatives for Fort George; 1989–2020 | Succeeded by Henry Usher |
Political offices
| Preceded by George Cadle Price | Leader of the Opposition; 1996–1998 | Succeeded by Dean Barrow |
| Preceded by Manuel Esquivel | Prime Minister of Belize; 1998–2008 | Succeeded by Dean Barrow |
| Preceded by Dean Barrow | Leader of the Opposition; 2008 | Succeeded by Johnny Briceño |
Party political offices
| Preceded by George Cadle Price | Leader of the People's United Party; 1996–2008 | Succeeded by Johnny Briceño |
