= People's United Party =

Political party in Belize

People's United Party Partido Unido del Pueblo
- Abbreviation: PUP
- Leader: Johnny Briceño
- Chairman: Henry Charles Usher
- Founded: 29 September 1950
- Headquarters: Independence Hall, 3 Queen Street, Belize City
- Newspaper: The Belize Times
- Youth wing: Belize Youth Movement
- Women's wing: United Women's Group
- Ideology: Christian democracy Social democracy Nationalism; Republicanism
- Political position: Centre
- Continental affiliation: COPPPAL
- International affiliation: Socialist International (consultative)
- Colors: Blue
- Seats in the Senate: 6 / 13
- Seats in the House: 26 / 31
- Council control: 8 / 9
- Councillors: 61 / 67

Party flag

Website
- www.pup.bz www.planbelize.bz

The People's United Party (Spanish: Partido Unido del Pueblo, PUP) is one of two major political parties in Belize. It is currently the governing party of Belize after success in the 2025 Belizean general election, winning a majority of 26 seats out of 31 in the Belizean House of Representatives. It is a centre-left Christian democratic party. The party leader is Johnny Briceño, who currently serves as the Prime Minister of Belize.

== Overview ==
The PUP was founded in 1950 out of the Nationalist Movement, as an anti-colonial party while the country was ruled by the United Kingdom as British Honduras. Under George Cadle Price the PUP played a major role in negotiating Belize's self-government in 1964 and eventual independence in 1981. The PUP dominated local British Honduran and later Belizean politics from the mid-1950s until 1984, when it lost to the centre-right opposition United Democratic Party (UDP). The UDP has been the party's main opposition since the early 1970s. Under Price's leadership, the PUP returned to power in 1989 but was defeated by the UDP again in 1993.

After Price's retirement in 1996, the PUP won a landslide victory in 1998 under the leadership of Said Musa. The PUP won 22 of the 29 seats in the House of Representatives in 2003. It subsequently held 21 seats after losing one to the UDP in a by-election in October 2003 after the death of one of its House members.

After nearly 10 years in power under Musa the PUP decisively lost the February 2008 election to the UDP, winning only six out of 31 seats. The party remained in opposition after the 2012 election, in which it gained 8 seats but was narrowly defeated by the UDP, and then lost 2 seats in the 2015 election. In the 2020 elections they won an overwhelming victory, gaining 14 seats and winning in almost all local councils. They maintained their majority of 26 seats in the 2025 election.

== Leaders ==
- John Smith (1950–1952)
- Leigh Richardson (acting) (1953–1956)
- George Cadle Price (1956–1996)
- Said Musa (1996–2008)
- Francis Fonseca (29 October 2011 – 31 January 2016)
- Johnny Briceño (2008–2011, 2016–present)

== Early history (1941–1952) ==
=== 1940s politics: the trade unions ===
Belizean politics in the 1940s was dominated by activists from the trade unions, particularly the Workers and Tradesmen's Union (later the General Workers Union, GWU), which had just received its right to organise British Honduran workers. Among the Union's leaders (some of whom would later be prominent in the PUP) were Clifford Betson, Antonio Soberanis, Henry Middleton and Nicholas Pollard Sr.

=== Coalescing against the British ===
Among the favourite places for anti-British sentiment to manifest itself was the Belize Town Board (now City Council), which offered opportunities for anti-colonial elements to gather strength and support from British Hondurans. A group of college-educated students, led by John Smith, George Price, Herbert Fuller and Herman Jex were all elected to positions on the Board and later the Legislative Council, assuring that they would be well placed to act. On December 31, 1949, an incident occurred that would force them to act.

=== Devaluation and the People's Committee ===
On this date, a Saturday, the Governor devalued the British Honduras dollar after previously insisting he would not do so. An ad hoc committee, the People's Committee (PC), was formed in January 1950 and began to speak out against this unwelcome act in particular and colonialism in general. Such members as Price and Smith in street corner meetings and Goldson and Richardson behind the printing press of the sympathetic daily the Belize Billboard, pressed the issue and sought the support of the Belizean people. A wave of anti-British and anti-colonial sentiment struck British Honduras (or Belize as the PC called it for the first time) that had never before been seen, not even in the 1930s at the height of Belize's Labour Movement. The PC found that almost overnight it had become the salvation of the people.

== Formation ==
Belizeans rapidly accepted the new party's statements against colonialism and exploitation of the masses. On February 12, 1950, a crowd of 10,000 marched to Government House in Belize City and proceeded to stone the houses of supposed pro-British elements. A meeting at the Battlefield Park in central Belize City was teargassed by police, and a state of emergency was imposed until July. It was the first time that Belizeans had spoken so forcefully against British colonial policy and on a national level, featuring men and women. By April, the PC/PUP had infiltrated the General Workers Union and sought to turn it toward a nationalist, socialist perspective. By September 1950, an overworked PC was forced to admit that it had overreached itself and that the work of enlightening British Hondurans was the vein of a political party. Its members agreed unanimously to the dissolving of the PC and the birth of the PUP on September 29, 1950.

=== British response ===
A draft constitutional report prepared to examine Belize's readiness for development appeared in April 1951. It argued that the British system allowed Belizeans to "(enjoy) the fruits of their labours" and argued that rapid political development in such a multi-ethnic society as Belize's was "premature". Among its complaints was that development was not uniform among all ethnic groups, the dominance of the Creoles, widespread illiteracy, and overall "backwardness' of Belizeans, especially outside of Belize City. Its views reflected those of the middle class of merchants and colonial supporters who saw no reason for change. The PUP attacked the report, mobilized its supporters against it and declared a break with all things colonial, including the name "British Honduras"; PUP leaders routinely referred to the country as Belize thereafter until the name was officially changed in 1973.

The colonialists also sought to mobilise support, and created a National Party in August 1951 to oppose the PUP; this party drew its support from middle-class Belizeans and British officials. One month earlier the colonial government dissolved the PUP-dominated Belize City Council for neglecting to place a portrait of King George VI in its chambers, and in October jailed PUP leaders Richardson and Phillip Goldson for an article in a local newspaper justifying revolution. Leader John Smith left immediately after that, having failed to persuade the party to fly a "Union Jack" at its meeting to counter statements that Guatemala had been aiding the PUP. In City Council elections of 1952, the party won just three of nine seats, with four going to the National Party and two to independents. The National Party had managed to recruit respectable anti-PUP elements from among women's leaders, trade unions and middle-class representatives and presented a better front. Nevertheless, George Price, the only leader to escape the colonial attack, topped the polls. since then the PUP took advantage

== Expansion and dissension (1953–1969) ==
=== General strike ===
The PUP for the moment turned its attention to the labour front. George Price was named head of the GWU in April 1952, and returning leaders Richardson and Goldson called for a "Crusade against Colonialism". The national holiday, on September 10, was dominated by a PUP-sponsored parade that clearly showed how much it had grown beyond its early years. Another opportunity came in October 1952 after workers at a Stann Creek citrus factory called a strike and were joined by their fellows in the Colonial Development Cooperation, United Fruit Company, Public Works Department and Belize Estate Company sawmill operations. Originally called for two days, the strike lasted 49 days on the support of Belizeans across the country, forcing the colonial government to capitulate and call for negotiations with all of the managements except for the BEC, which shut down its sawmill and left 268 workers jobless. Calls for scab labour were met with violence from demonstrators and a number of people were arrested, but by December 8 some 48 workers were on the job and the GWU called off the strike. Membership in the GWU (and support for the PUP) rose dramatically.

=== First national elections ===
The new constitution envisioned by the 1951 draft report called for universal adult suffrage and a Legislative Council of nine members. General elections, the nation's first, were called for April 28, 1954 and were contested by the PUP, the NP and independent candidates. The PUP stressed anti-colonialism and stood against the proposed British West Indies Federation which they claimed would destroy Belize's economy; their opponents continued to argue that the PUP was a front for Guatemala. The GWU proved important in getting out the vote in the districts and provided candidates in certain areas. On election day, 70% of the electorate voted, awarding the PUP eight seats and the National Party 1. A chagrined colonial government pledged to work with the PUP; the cautious victors replied that such a partnership would be welcomed only if it "did not retard the campaign against the colonial system". The colonials sought every opportunity to wreak havoc within the party. Already, the PUP was divided between a faction led by Richardson and Goldson, who advocated accepting the offer, and Price, who refused to compromise himself.

=== Party dissensions ===
This party dispute came to a head in the summer of 1956, in which ten central committee members left the Party, including Richardson and Phillip Goldson. A majority in the elected government, they nonetheless felt threatened by the overwhelming support in the street for Price, who controlled the rank and file through his connection with the GWU. Price was thereafter undisputed leader of the party, and went unchallenged for nearly four decades as such. As a minor result of the resignations, the GWU lost its popularity and this signalled the end of Labour's attempt to control the country's movement. The prodigal members had an equally hard time of it: their new party, in elections of March 1957, managed just 17% of voter popularity and overall voter turnout dropped to 63%.

George Price was dismissed from the Executive Council on the old charge of selling out to Guatemala, giving his opponents something to work with; although Belizeans still debate the relationship between Price and Guatemala, the charges were not immediately serious. In March 1958, a protracted charge of sedition was laid on him for supposedly uncomplimentary remarks about the possible reception of Queen Elizabeth II of the United Kingdom in Belize. A jury acquitted him and the charges backfired. Moreover, the PUP achieved its greatest electoral dominance in 1961 elections, sweeping all eighteen seats from the hapless National Independence Party.

=== Working toward self-government ===
In contrast with its early years of mass action against the colonial order, the PUP of the 1960s was more focused on change from within. In October 1961, Hurricane Hattie arrived on the shores of Belize City, causing destruction in the de facto capital. The PUP immediately began calling for the moving of the capital to higher ground, to escape flooding. This demand led to the construction of Belize's current capital, Belmopan, later in the decade, and of the village of Hattieville, 16 miles from the city, to host the hurricane's evacuees. It also showed that George Price's vision for the country was national, rather than insular.

As of 1959, a women's arm of the Party, the United Women's Group (UWG), was created under Gwendolyn Lizarraga, later Belize's first female Minister; its task was to mobilise Belize's women to eradicate poor conditions in housing and urban development. Its efforts were mixed at best and illustrate the PUP's unwillingness to allow women much room in the march to development, preferring them to depend on their male counterparts in government.

On January 1, 1963, Belize achieved internal self-government, the last step before full independence. All matters outside of foreign affairs and national defence would now be the province of the government. The British also retained the public service, including bureaucrats and police, and internal security, meaning that loyalty was a higher priority than development and forcing Price to actively recruit the middle class to the PUP's side.

The PUP in this era presided over the shift from forestry to agriculture, the rise of the sugar industry, reforms to labour laws, land distribution, infrastructural development and increased social services contributing to a general improvement in the standard of living.

== 1970s and early 1980s: new challenges ==
As the PUP moved into the 1970s, it controlled the nation of Belize like never before. It had not lost an election, general or municipal, ever, and enjoyed the confidence of the Belizean people. But new challenges arose that would ultimately lessen Belizeans' confidence in the PUP.

=== UBAD and PAC ===
In 1968, students began returning from abroad with a serious sense of the kind of development Belize needed to stay afloat in the modern world. Evan X Hyde, a young black middle-class Creole, graduated Dartmouth College, a predominantly white school, with an A.B. in English in 1968. He formed the United Black Association for Development (UBAD) in early 1969 and began seriously attacking the PUP's economic and social policies, equating them with neo-colonialism and denouncing them as "politricks". He joined trained lawyers Said Musa and Assad Shoman in the formation of their People's Action Committee (PAC), which was against "the North Atlantic economic domination (of Belize)" (Shoman) and in the analogue movement RAM (Revolutionary Action Movement) formed by a fusion of the two. Though none of these movements lasted for very long, they all left serious impressions on the psyche of the PUP, which prided itself on being the party of the people. The PUP first tried to silence them, stripping the latter of their jobs and laying charges of sedition, housebreaking and robbery on the former, all of which he dodged. When that did not work, they tried coopting them: Shoman and Musa later played prominent roles in the PUP and Hyde was thereafter relatively quiet in defence of or opposition to them. However, the party was shown to be indecisive in its handling of the two groups.

=== UDP and dwindling fortunes ===
At the formation of the United Democratic Party, a combination of the NIP, PDM and Liberal oppositions, it was thought that they could not present a worthy challenge to the ruling party. What happened next proved otherwise. The UDP proceeded, under Dean Lindo, to come within 18 votes of throwing the 18 seat Belize House of Representatives into deadlock, seized control of the Belize City Council from the PUP (for the first time in two decades) and winning municipal votes in 1975, 1977 and 1978. While Belizeans still wanted independence, it was felt that the UDP needed an opportunity to prove themselves in government. The results of the 1979 elections showed that the UDP had not quite passed that test, particularly because of their demands for a delayed independence due to Guatemala's claim to Belize remaining unsettled. While the PUP eventually fended off this initial UDP challenge, their policy on Guatemala and independence at any cost would prove the party's undoing.

=== Heads of Agreement and decline ===
On January 30, 1981, Premier Price presented to the house a paper with suggestions for the new constitution to come into effect on the eve of independence, which the United Nations maintained had to be no later than the end of 1981 when it supported Belize in a resolution at its 1980 meeting. On March 11, Price, Assad Shoman and other Belizean negotiators returned with a series of proposals they called the "Heads of Agreement", though nothing had actually been agreed on. The sixteen clauses called for Belize to make tough choices in order for the claim to be dropped, but Belizeans rebelled and set the country afire, forcing a state of emergency. It was under this state of emergency that Belize gained independence on September 21, 1981, a hollow victory that came at the price of losing Belizeans' trust. The PUP, hanging on for three more years despite economic losses and general discontent, finally called a general election for December 1984, and lost, 21–7, to the UDP. In many ways, it was the end of an era.

== Reform and resurgence ==
The PUP for much of the 1980s was heavily divided and out of ideas, characterised by intra-party fights such as the 1983 national convention in which Said Musa challenged Louis Sylvester, or occasional disputes between the so-called "left wing" of Shoman and Musa and the "right wing" of Sylvester, Ralph Fonseca and persons considered to be the chief financiers of the PUP. In 1986, Musa won the chairmanship position and began recruiting new faces into the party. The immediate result of this was improvement in municipal elections in the late 1980s and a close general election victory in 1989. In its first post-independence term the PUP hardly shied away from the same economic policy the UDP had utilised, involving economic growth by improving services. An early election in 1993 cost the PUP a chance to stay in power; a victorious alliance of the UDP and National Alliance for Belizean Rights forced the PUP to become the opposition party for a second time. The party lost the 1993 elections despite polling more votes overall than the UDP. The PUP had only been outpolled in popular votes previously in 1984. The PUP did internal repairs to the party hierarchy at national conventions in May 1994 and November 1996; the latter saw the resignation of George Price as party leader. Said Musa defeated Florencio Marin Sr. in the ensuing convention to name a new leader. After winning municipal votes in 1996 and 1997 and the general elections in 1998, the PUP were riding high once again.

== Today ==
The PUP led Belize to eight consecutive years of growth, despite serious external and internal shocks to the traditional and non-traditional bases of the economy.

In 2004, several ministers resigned from Cabinet citing inability to work within the current system. The party wooed them back almost immediately, but aftershocks from this incident continue to affect the party.

Belizeans today are more sceptical of the party than ever before due to constant accusations of corruption which it says are falsified. The 2005 protests in Belize highlighted some of these claims.

Following the PUP's defeat in the 2008 election, Musa and Fonseca announced that they were resigning from their leadership positions. Musa said that the PUP needed to "renew itself from the top".

On March 30, 2008, Johnny Briceño was elected as the leader of the PUP at a party convention in Belmopan, succeeding Musa. He defeated Francis Fonseca, who was considered to be the candidate preferred by the party establishment, receiving 330 votes against 310 for Fonseca.

A special convention was called for April 13, 2008 in Briceño's stronghold of Orange Walk.

On October 17, 2010, the PUP held their national convention in Dangriga in which Hon. Johnny Briceno was endorsed as the Party Leader. Carolyn Trench-Sandiford, a former party chair, was elected the PUP's (and Belize's) first ever female deputy leader.

On October 20, 2011, Francis Fonseca was endorsed at a meeting of the party's National Executive in Belize City as the new PUP leader following the resignation of Hon. Johnny Briceno on October 7. Fonseca was formally endorsed as party leader of the People's United Party at a special convention on October 29, 2011.

Following the general election in November 2015, Fonseca resigned as party leader. A national convention was held on January 31, 2016, to elect a new leader. Johnny Briceño returned as leader as the party with 1122 votes to Fonseca's 917.

=== Media ===
The Belize Times was established by George Price in 1956 and publishes once a week from party headquarters at Queen Street. Its current editor is Jose Jimenez. Vibes Radio was established in 2002 as the official party station. Its manager is Gerald Garbutt.

== Election results ==
=== House of Representatives elections ===
Election	Party leader	Votes	%	Seats	+/–	Position	Result
1954	Leigh Richardson	9,461	65.04%	8 / 9	▲8	▲1st	Supermajority government
1957	George Cadle Price	6,876	61.32%	9 / 9	▲1	1st	Supermajority government
1961	George Cadle Price	13,975	64.67%	18 / 18	▲9	1st	Supermajority government
1965	George Cadle Price	15,271	59.07%	16 / 18	▼2	1st	Supermajority government
1969	George Cadle Price	12,888	58.85%	17 / 18	▲1	1st	Supermajority government
1974	George Cadle Price	12,269	52.66%	12 / 18	▼5	1st	Supermajority government
1979	George Cadle Price	23,309	52.44%	13 / 18	▲1	1st	Supermajority government
1984	George Cadle Price	20,961	44.00%	7 / 28	▼6	▼2nd	Opposition
1989	George Cadle Price	29,986	50.87%	15 / 28	▲8	▲1st	Majority government
1993	George Cadle Price	36,082	51.23%	13 / 29	▼2	▼2nd	Opposition
1998	Said Musa	50,330	59.67%	26 / 29	▲13	▲1st	Supermajority government
2003	Said Musa	52,934	53.16%	22 / 29	▼4	1st	Supermajority government
2008	Said Musa	47,624	40.72%	6 / 31	▼15	▼2nd	Opposition
2012	Francis Fonseca	61,329	47.54%	14 / 31	▲8	2nd	Opposition
2015	Francis Fonseca	67,566	47.77%	12 / 31	▼2	2nd	Opposition
2020	Johnny Briceño	66,053	59.63%	26 / 31	▲14	▲1st	Supermajority government
2025	Johnny Briceño	85,096	67.91%	26 / 31	Steady	1st	Supermajority government
