= United Democratic Party (Belize) =

United Democratic Party Partido Democrático Unido
- Abbreviation: UDP
- Leader: Tracy Panton
- Chairperson: Sheena Pitts
- First Deputy Leader: Hugo Patt
- Second Deputy Leader: Miguel Guerra
- Founded: 27 September 1973
- Merger of: National Independence Party; People's Development Movement; Liberal Party; United Black Association for Development (partial)
- Headquarters: Youth for the Future Drive, Belize City, Belize
- Newspaper: The Guardian
- Youth wing: Youth Popular Front
- Ideology: Conservatism
- Political position: Centre-right
- Regional affiliation: Caribbean Democrat Union
- Colors: Red
- Seats in the Senate: 3 / 13
- Seats in the House: 5 / 31
- Council Control: 1 / 9
- Councillors: 6 / 67

Party flag

Website
- www.udp.org.bz

The United Democratic Party (Spanish: Partido Democrático Unido; abbreviated UDP) is one of the two major political parties in Belize. It is currently the main opposition party, having lost the 2025 Belizean general election, after previously holding the government across three prior terms. Founded as a centre-right conservative party, the UDP is led by Interim Leader Hugo Patt, though his position is contested by Tracy Taegar-Panton, who is already sworn in as leader of the opposition.

== History ==
=== Foundation and early history ===
In 1973, political opposition in Belize was weak and the ruling People's United Party (PUP) had never lost a legislative election since its foundation. The main opposition parties, the National Independence Party and the People's Development Movement met together with a new Liberal Party to consider forming an alliance to fight the PUP. The resulting merger formed the United Democratic Party on 27 September 1973. Controversially, a significant portion of the United Black Association for Development also voted to join the UDP upon foundation.

The UDP's first electoral test was the 1974 general election in which it fielded candidates nationwide except in Corozal District, where it supported candidates from the Corozal United Front. It won six seats, and was within 18 votes of winning three more. Former People's Development Movement head Dean Lindo was subsequently named party leader. The party had success in municipal elections during the 1970s, but failed to defeat the PUP in the 1979 general elections. Its representation in the House of Representatives dropped to five seats and party leader Lindo lost his seat to Said Musa and was replaced as leader by Theodore Aranda. Despite internal divisions, the party retained control of three towns in the December 1981 municipal elections.

=== 1983–present ===
In late 1982, Aranda was removed as party leader and replaced by Curl Thompson, who would later be replaced by former Liberal Party leader Manuel Esquivel following a convention. In December 1983, the UDP won Belize City Council election.

The party was victorious in the 1984 general election, winning 21 of the 28 seats. Esquivel became the first UDP member elected Prime Minister. The party went on to lost power in the 1989 elections, winning 13 seats to the PUP's 15.

For the 1993 elections the party formed an alliance with the National Alliance for Belizean Rights. The alliance won 16 of the 29 seats, with the UDP taking fifteen. However, they were soundly defeated in the 1998 elections as the PUP won 26 of the 29 seats, after which Esquivel was replaced by Barrow as party leader. The PUP remained in power following the 2003 elections, in which the UDP only won seven seats. After ten years in opposition, the UDP won the 2008 general elections, taking 25 of the 31 seats.

In 2020, UDP Prime Minister Dean Barrow called for elections to take place in November 2020. This was during the global COVID-19 pandemic which had hit the country's economy hard. The pandemic, along with impacts of Hurricane Eta, caused significant voter discontent with the current government. Ultimately, the UDP suffered one of the worst results in the party's history, winning only 5 of the 31 seats.

In the 2025 Belizean general election, the party maintained the same number of seats.

== List of leaders ==
- Dean Lindo (1974–1979)
- Theodore Aranda (1979–1982)
- Curl Thompson (1982–1983)
- Manuel Esquivel (1983–1998)
- Dean Barrow (1998–2020)
- John Saldivar (2020)
- Patrick Faber (2020–2022)
- Moses Barrow (2022–2025)
- Tracy Panton (2025 -)

== Election results ==
=== House of Representatives elections ===
Election	Party leader	Votes	%	Seats	+/–	Position	Outcome
1974	Dean Lindo	9,069	38.93%	6 / 18	▲6	▲2nd	Opposition
1979	Dean Lindo	21,045	47.4%	5 / 18	▼1	2nd	Opposition
1984	Manuel Esquivel	25,756	54.1%	21 / 28	▲16	▲1st	Supermajority government
1989	Manuel Esquivel	28,900	49.0%	13 / 28	▼8	▼2nd	Opposition
1993	Manuel Esquivel	34,306	48.7% In alliance with NABR	16 / 29	▲3	▲1st	Majority government
1998	Manuel Esquivel	33,237	39.41%	3 / 29	▼12	▼2nd	Opposition
2003	Dean Barrow	45,376	45.57%	7 / 29	▲4	2nd	Opposition
2008	Dean Barrow	66,203	56.61%	25 / 31	▲17	▲1st	Supermajority government
2012	Dean Barrow	64,976	50.37%	17 / 31	▼8	1st	Majority government
2015	Dean Barrow	71,452	50.52%	19 / 31	▲2	1st	Majority government
2020	Patrick Faber	42,724	38.61%	5 / 31	▼14	▼2nd	Opposition
2025	Contested leadership	37,328	29.79%	5 / 31	Steady	2nd	Opposition
