= Michel Chebat =

Belizean lawyer

Michel Hannah Chebat, Jr. (born 23 May 1969) is a Belizean lawyer and politician. He has previously served as chairman of Belize's Social Security Board as well as president of the Bar Association of Belize. He is a partner in the law firm of Shoman and Chebat together with Lisa Shoman.

== Social Security Board ==
In 1999, Chebat became an attorney for the Social Security Board, but resigned from that position in August 2006, ostensibly to protest the dismissal of CEO Narda Garcia. At the end of the month, however, Chebat rejoined the SSB, succeeding his law partner Lisa Shoman's father Yasin Shoman as board chairman. During his chairmanship, Chebat oversaw a feasibility study for the implementation of non-contributory pensions, the rollout of national health insurance, and the creation of a new logo. He was succeeded in February 2008 by Lois Young, the ex-wife of Prime Minister Dean Barrow.

== Bar Association of Belize ==
Chebat was elected secretary of the Bar Association of Belize in 1999, where he served alongside fellow officers President Fred Lumor, Vice-president Rodwell Williams, and Treasurer Edwin Flowers. He was re-elected to another two-year term in that position in 2001, in a vote that was seen as a referendum on the removal of Justice George Meerabux from the Supreme Court of Belize. He was later elected president of the Bar Association. In that position, he spoke out against lack of enforcement of environmental laws, as well as the long wait for civil cases to be heard in Belize's overloaded court system. In 2011, outgoing chief justice of Belize Samuel Awich named Chebat and Solicitor-General Cheryl Krusen as senior counsels.

== Major cases ==
Beginning in 2003, Chebat and Simeon Sampson represented two businessman accused of facilitating more than a hundred false Belizean passport applications, in the biggest passport issuance scandal in Belizean history. His clients removed themselves from Belize multiple times during the course of the proceedings, causing years of delays. At one point this led Director of Public Prosecutions Kirk Anderson to suggest that one of them be tried in absentia, though Supreme Court Justice Adolph Lucas ruled against this because the suspect in question had not been arraigned. Chebat successfully defended one suspect against the charges; the other suspect, who remained absent from Belize, apparently had absconded to Lebanon, and was reported dead in a traffic accident there in 2007.

In 2006, Ellis Arnold, Chebat, and Lutchman Sooknandan represented a shopkeeper accused of manslaughter for shooting and killing an employee who was armed with a machete and high on cocaine, but their argument of self-defense was not sufficient to keep the jury from convicting their client; Chief Justice Abdulai Conteh sentenced him to seven years' imprisonment.

Beginning in 2011, Chebat began represented the Belize Association of Evangelical Churches and the Council of Churches as an interested party in United Belize Advocacy Movement and Caleb Orozco v Attorney General, a case concerning LGBT rights in Belize. The case is ongoing, though the United Belize Advocacy Movement has been struck out as an interested party for lack of locus standi.

== Personal life ==
Chebat was born in Belize City. He received his B.A. from Florida International University, where he studied international relations. He went on to the University of the West Indies for his LL.B. and Norman Manley Law School for his Legal Education Certificate. He was called to the bar in 1997.
