= Chayben Abou-Nehra =

Belizean businessman

Chayben Abou-Nehra (1974 – 21 December 2008), also referred to as Ben Bou-Nahra, was a Belizean businessman. He had a variety of business activities, including as a 10% shareholder in Miles Tropical Energy, which had various petroleum concessions off the coast near Dangriga. He was a controversial figure both in life and in death. Charged with manslaughter after killing a man in September 2005, he absented himself from Belize at a time when the charges were upgraded to murder, returned when the charges were downgraded to manslaughter, and then walked free in 2007 when witnesses against him refused to testify. Late the following year he was found dead in his hotel room of a gunshot wound, in what may have been a suicide.

== Death of Shawn Copious ==
=== Shooting and charges ===
On 17 September 2005 at roughly 3:30 AM, Abou-Nehra returned to his home in King's Park, Belize City to find 23-year-old Shawn Copious in his yard. Abou-Nehra claims Copious advanced on him in a threatening manner. Abou-Nehra had a licensed 9mm pistol on his person, which he drew and fired at Copious six times, killing him. Police found a large meat cleaver on Copious' person. Copious had previously had numerous run-ins with the law, with a conviction for theft and at the time of his death also standing trial for charges of handling stolen goods. Abou-Nehra had earlier that year been accused of shooting a man at BTL Park, but no charges were filed in that incident. Copious' stepfather Lawrence Mejia spoke with Abou-Nehra after Copious' death, and described him as "a really good man" who showed remorse for the killing and offered what help he could to the family, but expressed confusion that his stepson's injuries were not just limited to a gunshot wound but also consisted of broken teeth, hands, and nose. Abou-Nehra offered BZ$3,000 to Copious' mother Caroline Copious to pay the burial expenses.

Police held Abou-Nehra for 48 hours, but at the time regarded the killing as a justifiable use of force and did not file charges. However, in July 2006 police charged him with manslaughter; he was represented by attorneys Kareem Musa and Ellis Arnold in his first court appearance, at which his bail was set at BZ$10,000 and he was given a September court date. As more detail about the circumstances of Copious' death came to light, specifically the fact that he had been shot in the back from five feet away, then-Senior Crown Counsel Cheryl-Lynn Branker-Taitt wrote to Criminal Investigations Bureau chief Chester Williams to recommend that Abou-Nehra be charged with murder. In December 2006, Director of Public Prosecutions Kirk Anderson instructed Commissioner of Polize Gerald Westby to charge Abou-Nehra with murder. However, at that time Abou-Nehra had already departed Belize, according to his attorney Dickie Bradley for purposes of receiving medical care. He then failed to show up for his arraignment hearing in January 2007, at which the complaint of murder was supposed to have been read. A note purporting to be from a doctor in Fort Lauderdale, Florida stated that Abou-Nehra was medically incapable of travelling. In May 2007, he was finally indicted on charges of manslaughter rather than murder. He came before Judge Troadio Gonzalez, who ordered that the case be traversed to the following month's court session due to the large backlog of defendants with charges even older than Abou-Nehra's. His bail was set at BZ$10,000.

=== Walks free due to police refusal to testify ===
After Anderson stepped down, the new DPP Lutchman Sooknandan reduced Abou-Nehra's charges back to manslaughter. In July, Sooknandan had to issue a declaration of nolle prosequi because the crown counsel assigned to the case, Cecil Ramirez, had been suspended from practicing law in 2002 and 2003, leading to a question of whether he could legally work for the Office of the DPP. However, Sooknandan said that Abou-Nehra could be re-arrested on the charges. Abou-Nehra came to trial on manslaughter charges again in October. However, three police officers called as witnesses claimed they could not identify him, and the signed record of the caution statement given to Abou-Nehra went missing. Justice Adolph Lucas had no choice but to direct the jury to find Abou-Nehra not guilty of manslaughter. He berated the witnesses as "worthless and wicked", while Sooknandan described the police's conduct as creating "the most shameful miscarriage of justice" he had ever seen. Belizean law prohibits double jeopardy, meaning that there was no possibility of a further trial.

In October 2007, two of the witnesses Darius Ramos and Anthony Poloni, both constables, were charged with perjury and contradicting previous evidence; they pleaded not guilty. The DPP declined to charge the third witness, former Inspector Clement Cacho, who by then had been demoted to sergeant. An internal police tribunal later found that Ramos, Polonio, and Cacho had committed an "Act to the Prejudice of Good Order and Discipline against the Department". Cacho was reduced in rank and given half-pay, but later filed suit in the Supreme Court against the police department and in 2010 was awarded reinstatement and back pay.

== Death ==
In 2008, Abou-Nehra was on holiday up country in Cayo District with his fiancée, 22-year-old Evita Bedran, the granddaughter of late hotel magnate Escander Bedran. They went to a disco in Benque Viejo del Carmen a few miles away, where he got into an altercation. His shirt stained with blood, he then returned with Bedran to San Ignacio town and went to their hotel, the San Ignacio Resort Hotel owned by Bedran's family, in order to get a new set of clothes. After changing, he got into another altercation, this time with a security guard at the hotel. Another security guard attempted to calm the two, and got himself pistol-whipped by Abou-Nehra for his trouble, receiving a laceration to the head requiring four stitches. The two security guards filed a police report against Abou-Nehra, while Abou-Nehra himself returned to his room. By the time police arrived at the hotel, Abou-Nehra was laid out on the floor of his hotel room with a gunshot wound.

Abou-Nehra was taken first to San Ignacio's Loma Luz Hospital, and then Belize City's Karl Heusner Memorial Hospital, where he was declared dead at 7 AM the following morning. His family expressed suspicion that he would have committed suicide, and requested to have their own forensic pathologist observe the autopsy at KNMH. Pathologist Mario Estradaban declined comment. He was survived by a daughter Madison, as well as his mother Maria and sister Rachelle.
