= List of political scandals in Belize =

This is a list of noted political scandals that have actually or allegedly involved individuals or entities active in the politics of Belize since the 2000s. This list does not exclude political controversies. (Note: This article relies mainly on press coverage, so may miss political scandals or controversies which did not gain notoriety, including actual or alleged violations of morality, ethics, propriety, or law not widely noted in press. This article does not include scandalous cases of police brutality nor police killings; see List of cases of police brutality in Belize and List of killings by law enforcement officers in Belize. Notes and short citations provided in Nb columns. Short citations in the form A yy refer to Amnesty International, yyyy report, sec Belize. Short citations in the form S yy refer to US State Department, report for yyyy, sec Belize. Short citations in the form Am yy refer to Amandala, review for yyyy (or for split reviews, Am yyi refer to the first part of the review, Am yyii refer to second part, and so on).)

== 2020s ==
Date	Parties	Description	Outcome	Nb
Nov 2024	Dorothy Bradley, Maria Rodriguez	Opposition and unaligned senators accused government of deliberately not preparing for the upcoming retirement of the Auditor General (Bradley) in order to undermine the Office. They blocked the temporary appointment of the Deputy Auditor General (Rodriguez) on 11 November.	–	(Note: Am 24ii. Bradley sworn in for two-year term on 13 January 2023 after government were unable to find a successor (Am 23i).)
Sep 2024	Andre Perez	Police discovered 1.045 pounds of suspected cocaine in a docked boat belonging to an MP (Perez) on 27 September. Authorities cleared the MP of suspicion 'as the boat had been docked for repairs at a boatyard for over 6 months.'	–	(Note: Am 24ii.)
Sep 2024	Omar Figueroa, Michel Chebat	UDP standard bearer for Cayo North (Figueroa) challenged the registration of over 100 electors transferred by their PUP counterpart (Chebat). The court struck 23 voters off the Cayo North roll, though stricken voters were appealing the decision by year's end.	–	(Note: Am 24ii; "UDP accuses Cayo North's Micho Chebat of voter padding". BBN. San Ignacio, Belize. 4 September 2024.; "Peyrefitte questions judicial process; Allegations of voter list padding in Cayo North". Reporter. Belize City. 9 September 2024. First challenge to transfer of electors (Am 24ii). Figueroa claimed there were a further circa 400 questionable transfers (Am 24ii).)
Aug 2024	UB, Health Min	News broke on 8 August that government had changed the site of a planned $90 million hospital for the public university (University of Belize) from their campus to a private property bought for $6.9 million from two Asian nationals allegedly connected to both majority parties.	–	(Note: Am 24ii. Deemed 'one of the biggest scandals to rock the Briceno administration' (Am 24ii).)
Jul 2024	Moses Barrow, Michael Peyrefitte, Tracy Panton	A UDP faction (Alliance for Democracy) petitioned twice to recall the party leader (Barrow) in late July. After the party chair (Peyrefitte) refused to call a national convention, the faction held their own convention and 'recalled' the leader and 'elected' an interim leader (Panton). The faction then forcibly gained control of the party headquarters on 28 October. A civil suit and countersuit were pending as of year's end.	–	(Note: Am 24ii.)
Jul 2024	Kevin Herrera	During a Senate session debating the extension of a crime-related state of emergency, a senator (Herrera) 'questioned whether we should consider more draconian measures like prolonged SOEs.'	–	(Note: Am 24ii.)
Jul 2024	Central Prison	Reports emerged of a 13 year old, detained under a crime-related state of emergency, being held with adult inmates at Central Prison. He was transferred to a juvenile detention centre after public outcry, as was a 15 year old in similar circumstances. A court case was pending by year's end.	–	(Note: Am 24ii.)
Jan 2024	Orson Elrington	Two Belize City women accused a prominent lawyer and UDP official (Elrington) of rape on 12 January. Elrington, who claimed the intercourse had been consensual, resigned from his party posts and was criminally charged in March 2024. The Legal Council found Elrington guilty of grave professional misconduct on 19 April.	Elrington resigned, charged in Mar 2024	(Note: Am 24i.)
Sep 2023	Natl Teachers' Union	The Benque Viejo, Cayo branch of the National Teachers' Union faced backlash for opposing the holding of the annual Children's Rally on the same day as Guatemalan independence. The Rally was held as scheduled, though some schools and teachers did not participate.	–	(Note: Am 23ii.)
Sep 2023	Kevin Cadle	A senior civil servant in the Youth Department (Cadle) resigned following allegations of academic fraud.	Cadle resigned in 2023	(Note: Am 23ii; "DYS Deputy Dir. Kevin Cadle's academic record questioned". 7 News. Belize City. 15 September 2023.; "Director of Department of Youth Services resigns amid controversy". Love News. Belize City. 25 September 2023.)
Aug 2023	vars demonstrators	Opposition denied a demonstration permit in San Pedro, Belize. Demonstration held but interrupted by police. Denial and interruption criticised as breaches of constitutional right to assembly.	–	
Aug 2023	PM, Moses Barrow	The Speaker disqualified a motion of no confidence against the PM by the Opposition Leader (Barrow), whereupon Government revived a previous amendment to the Constitution Act 1981 regarding 'additional grounds' for the disqualification of MPs, seen by some as targeting Barrow.	Amendment not moved in 2023	(Note: Am 23ii. Barrow apologised for an 'angry e-mail message' he had sent the Speaker for disqualifying his motion (Am 23 ii).)
Aug 2023	Hugo Patt, Kerry Belisle, Wilbert Vallejos, Roosevelt Blades	Government sued the former Lands Minister (Patt), his chief executive (Belisle), Lands Commissioner (Vallejos), and three private companies (linked to Blades), alleging that just prior to the November 2020 elections, the companies paid $59,000 for lands which government had acquired for $6.5 million.	–	(Note: Am 23ii.)
Aug 2023	Andre Perez	The Economy Minister (Perez) was suspended from Cabinet after being accused of sexual harassment by a female lawyer. Perez accused the lawyer of extortion, claiming the relationship had been consensual. An investigation by the Attorney General's Ministry was pending by year's end.	Perez suspended, under investigation in 2023	(Note: Am 23ii; "PM comments on misconduct allegation against Minister". 7 News. Belize City. 17 August 2023.; "Minister Andre Perez out of Cabinet over sex scandal". Amandala. Belize City. 23 August 2023.)
Aug 2023	Ricardo Borja, Resources Min	Upon the murder of a Belize City businessman (Borja), it was revealed he had recently given testimony regarding a land scam in Placencia, Stann Creek, allegedly involving multiple civil servants in the Natural Resources Ministry. The Ministry stated the matter was under review in 2023.	–	(Note: Am 23ii; "Was Ricardo Borja killed for coming clean about fraudulent land transactions?". News 5. Belize City. 23 August 2023.; "Ministry of Natural Resources investigates land fraud allegations after businessman's murder". Love News. Belize City. 27 September 2023.)
Jul 2023	Elections Commn, vars media	Elections & Boundaries Commission gagged media from disclosing contents of a recent redistricting report (until laid before Parliament). Opposition criticised the gag order for muffling the free press.	–	(Note: S 23. Report not made public by November 2023 (S 23). Report presented by 17 July, but not debated by end 2023; some Government MPs, Opposition, and Belize Peace Movement objected to some recommendations in leaked report (Am 23i). Caye Caulker voters likewise petitioned to reject a relevant recommendation in leaked report (Am 23ii). BPM lost a lawsuit against the Commission in January 2024 which sought to have them recommend redistricting, though per court advice, BPM brought another claim under the Representation of the People Act, pending by end 2024 (Am 24i).)
Jul 2023	Erwin Contreras, Portico Enterprises Ltd	A Senate special select committee (chair Janelle Chanona) appointed on 10 July to investigate a contract for a cruise ship port in Belize City previously awarded to Portico Enterprises Ltd (principal David Gegg) by former Economic Minister (Contreras). Contract (including major concessions to the company) allegedly signed without Cabinet approval.	–	(Note: S 23; Am 24i; Am 23i; Am 23ii. Finance Min allegedly urged Cabinet to approve the contract in May 2023 (Am 23i).)
Jul 2023	Transport Bd, Serrano's, Cn Transit	The Transport Board revoked Serrano's permit to run a bus line in favour of newcomer, Central Transit, which was accused of being connected with someone in government. A lawsuit was pending by year's end.	–	(Note: Am 23ii.)
Jul 2023	Anthony Martinez, Gilroy Usher	The former UDP MP for Port Loyola (Martinez) announced his intent to petition to recall the current PUP MP (Usher).	–	(Note: Am 23ii; "Boots Martinez leads charge to recall Gilroy Usher Sr. in Port Loyola". News 5. Belize City. 12 July 2023.)
Jun 2023	Chester Williams, Moses Barrow, 7 News, News 5	Commissioner of Police (Williams) sued 7 News and News 5 for publishing a statement by Opposition Leader (Barrow) claiming he had issued a gun licence without proper due diligence. Both news stations complied with a demand to publicly apologise to Williams.	–	
Jun 2023	Chester Williams	Reports surfaced of people buying gun licences from the Police Commissioner (Williams), and in one case deliberately misrepresenting background information. Parliament amended gun licensing legislation to entrust licences to a three-member board in 2023, though it had not been constituted by year's end.	Licensing reformed in 2023	(Note: Am 23i.)
May 2023	Home Min, DPP	Home Minister appointed a special prosecutor to a murder case from which DPP had recused herself and her office. Appointment criticised by some members of Bar Association and Opposition as unconstitutional.	–	(Note: S 23. DPP related by marriage to the accused (S 23). Critics noted special prosecutor appointments were constitutionally the sole prerogative of DPP (S 23).)
May 2023	Rodwell Ferguson, Marconi Leal, Adele Catzim-Sanchez	A new chief executive (Catzim-Sanchez) was named for the Transport Ministry after an apparent falling out between the Minister (Ferguson) and the former chief executive (Leal).	–	(Note: Am 23i; "Minister Dolores welcomes C.E.O. Marconi Leal Jr. to her Ministry". News 5. Belize City. 3 May 2023.)
Apr 2023	Bar Assn	A bill regarding NGOs was tabled and read in Parliament, despite significant concern from NGOs and the Bar Association. Government stated the bill was required to comply with international obligations. Parliament passed the Non-Profit Organisations Act 2023.	Act passed in 2023	(Note: Am 23i.)
Apr 2023	St Luke Sch, Mario Bustillos	Thirty-one students (mostly from St Luke Methodist Primary) and seven adults in Belize City were rushed to Karl Heusner after unknowingly consuming snacks and gummies laced with cannabis on 25 April. It was later revealed that the snacks and gummies had been posted from overseas to a suspended police officer, and disposed of by a Police Department exhibit keeper (Bustillos), who was later charged with harm by negligence.	Bustillos charged in 2023	(Note: Am 23i.)
Apr 2023	Ruth Shoman, Jorge Mejia	President of the National Teachers' Union (Shoman), elected 13 April, resigned on 1 September after 'a sustained challenge by some union members about her past.' Jorge Mejia assumed the office ad interim.	Shoman resigned in Sep 2023	(Note: Am 23i.)
Mar 2023	Virgilio Murillo, JP Assn	Central Prison governor (Murillo) reported that visiting justices had not resumed their prison visits since September 2022, and that the Association of Justices of the Peace had not yet designated visiting JPs.	–	(Note: Am 23i.)
Feb 2023	Eamon Courtenay	When Senate approved ratification of the Escazu Agreement on 10 February, the Foreign Minister (Courtenay) stated ratification would be delayed until Costa Rica made their position clear. The delay was condemned by various NGOs, leading to ratification on 27 February.	Agreement ratified	(Note: Am 23i.)
Feb 2023	Foreign Min	The Foreign Ministry announced on 2 February that they had agreed to resettle a Guantanamo prisoner, 42 year old Majid Khan of Pakistan.	–	(Note: Am 23i. Deemed 'a shocking revelation' (Am 23i).)
Jan 2023	Michael Espat	A minister of state (Espat) made controversial remarks regarding Maya residents of Toledo, deeming their land rights movement 'bad for the country' and calling for a 'sledgehammer' to break it down. The 'use of any racist language and fearmongering' condemned by government.	–	
Jan 2023	John Saldivar, Moses Barrow	The Opposition Leader (Barrow) called for charges to be brought against former MP and current UDP standard bearer for Belmopan (Saldivar) for alleged private use of a Coast Guard vessel. No charges had been filed by year's end.	–	(Note: Am 23i; "Shyne says charge John Saldivar for willful suppression". News 5. Belize City. 4 January 2023.; "Shyne says vote for anyone but Saldivar". 7 News. Belize City. 4 January 2023.; Amandala 2023c. Saldivar designated 'significantly corrupt' by US State on 15 Nov 2022 (Amandala 2023c). Saldivar barred from running for standard bearer in national convention by a UDP special committee on 2 December 2022, but committee's decision overturned by larger UDP national council on 19 December 2022; won convention on 5 February 2023 (Amandala 2023c).)
Jan 2023	Ramon Cervantes	A Foreign Affairs minister of state (Cervantes) was reassigned to the Ministry of Sustainable Development, though the PM denied allegations that the shuffle was due to questionable behaviour.	–	(Note: Am 23i; "GOB confirms Monchie's move". 7 News. Belize City. 6 January 2023.; "UDP places Immigration Ministry under microscope". Amandala. Belize City. 25 January 2023.)
Aug 2022	–	Parliament passed the Defamation Act 2022 without consultation with media, who opposed it, noting it would 'directly affect the way they gather, compile, and present news.'	–	
Jun 2022	Dean Barrow	Finance Ministry documents were leaked that detailed payments (totalling $5 mil) made to law firms connected to former PM (Barrow) and his family in 2011–2020. Barrow conceded there were instances of 'extreme exigent circumstances' when government turned to his law firm.	–	
May 2022	vars campaigners	There was widespread use of government resources, such as vehicles and personnel, for campaign purposes during village council elections.	–	
Mar 2022	vars Toledoans	Residents of the Maya-majority Indian Creek, Toledo protested the use of their football field for the landing of a helicopter during a royal visit. They complained they had not been consulted and were threatened with arrest if they disrupted the visit.	Itinerary changed	
Feb 2022	vars Toledoans, Fauna & Flora Intl	Residents of the Maya-majority Indian Creek, Toledo protested the sale of 12,871 acres of land they deemed communal to Fauna & Flora Intl (a conservation NGO). Also, those of the Garifuna-majority Barranco, Toledo protested logging permits issued to outsiders without their consultation nor consent, and in preference to villagers themselves.	–	(Note: S 22. In first case, government 'requested patience from Maya communities' (S 22). In second case, minister Orlando Habet stated government was 'attempting to regulate the issuance of permits because in the past these were sold to companies without major benefits to the community' (S 22).)
Jan 2022	Henry Usher	Cabinet assigned a religious affairs portfolio to a minister (Usher), who stated he wished to 'merge the public service with the Christian fundamentals and principles upon which the country is based.' Various NGOs raised concerns.	–	(Note: S 22. LGBTQ activist Caleb Orozco noted this 'risked governance being influenced by Christian morality and not guided by human rights and dignity' (S 22).)
Nov 2021	Marco Vidal, four policemen	Four subordinates of the Asst Commissioner of Police (Vidal) were involved in drug airplane landings.	Vidal resigned in May 2022	(Note: S 22; "Breaking: Assistant Commissioner of Police Marco Vidal to retire; investigation of former COST team found 'minor infractions' other than presence at drug plane landing". BBN. San Ignacio, Belize. 7 May 2022. Vidal 'forced to resign for negligence and administrative failures' in May 2022 (S 22).)
Sep 2021	Rene Montero	BPD issued wanted notice on 6 September for former Works Minister (Montero), under investigation for misuse of human resources and government property to develop private property in which Montero had a personal financial interest.	Montero surrendered in Jul 2022	(Note: S 21; S 22. As of 15 November 2021, Montero was presumed to have fled the country (S 21). Surrendered after an Interpol red notice (S 22).)
Jul 2021	Ramiro de la Rosa	Rosa was not afforded adequate time and facilities to prepare a defence prior to sentencing for possession of unlicensed firearm. When he pled guilty to the offence (allegedly to spare his wife), he was immediately sentenced to prison, contrary to standard practice (granting bail).	–	(Note: S 21. Rosa released pending appeal in 2021 (S 21). The firearm (allegedly belonging to Rosa's recently deceased father-in-law) had been discovered by police during a warrantless search of Rosa's residence (S 21).)
Apr 2021	PM, Lionel Arzu	PM refused to renew the outgoing Ombudsman's (Arzu's) term, and refused to appoint a new one, leading to a 22-month vacancy in the Office.	New Ombudsman appointed in Feb 2023	(Note: S 21; S 22; S 23. Herman Swazo appointed on 10 February 2023 by PM (S 23). Arzu sued for breach of contract (non-consensual reductions in salary, allowances, holidays) in August 2021 (S 21); court ruled in their favour in August 2022 (S 22).)
Apr 2021	Narda Garcia, Alex Sanker	Permanent secretary of the PM's Office (Garcia) threatened a well-known painter (Sanker) with a civil suit for a painting depicting her at the SSB during a period when funds were mismanaged.	–	(Note: S 21. 'Garcia was subsequently investigated' (S 21).)
Apr 2021	Dean Barrow, Luke Martinez	The work of a Commission of Inquiry, appointed in February to investigate the sale of government assets between October 2019 and November 2020 (under PM Barrow), was suspended after the PSU commissioner (Martinez) recused himself in protest of the continued sale of public assets by the new administration (the same actions the commission was investigating).	Inquiry resumed on 16 Aug 2021	(Note: S 21. Assets sold included office equipment, furniture, and vehicles (S 21).)
Feb 2021	Marvin Manzanero, Deysi Mendez	Director of Health (Manzanero), who had been recovering from COVID-19, returned to find his post occupied and was offered a demotion. When Manzanero refused, the Ministry's permanent secretary (Mendez) informed him he was suspended while under investigation for misconduct.	–	(Note: S 21. Demotions legally require PSC review (S 21). Government proposed to split Manzanero's post in October 2021, thereby lowering Manzanero's rank sans formal demotion (S 21).)
Jan 2021	Ian Jones, Dean Flowers, vars civil servants	Reports abounded of government employees who were unfairly terminated from central government and municipal posts when the new government administration came into power, notably including the Sports Director (Jones). PSU president (Flowers) said the terminations were for 'political reasons.'	–	(Note: S 21; "U.D.P. political appointees refusing to leave". News 5. Belize City. 30 November 2020.; "PM to political appointees, please pack bags". 7 News. Belize City. 12 November 2020.; "An honorable contract officer would resign". Amandala. Belize City. 9 December 2020.; "UDP stands up for fired workers". 7 News. Belize City. 21 January 2021.; "Public officers complain about unfair dismissal". News 5. Belize City. 12 January 2021.; "A constitutional conflict: PSC vs. GOB". 7 News. Belize City. 22 January 2021.; "Public Service Union writes Minister of Public Service over allegations of union busting". BBN. San Ignacio, Belize. 3 May 2021. An Accountant Genl memo instructed that some terminated employees (hired as 'general open vote workers' and so classed as temporary rather than permanent employees) be denied certain retirement benefits (S 21). PSU provided legal counsel; Jones sued in February 2021 (S 21).)
Sep 2020	Nestor Vasquez	The CEO (Vasquez) of state-owned BTL was embroiled in a corruption and embezzlement scandal for transferring company properties to his personal holdings and charging more than $800,000 to his corporate credit card for personal uses.	Vasquez removed in 2020	(Note: S 20. Under the previous government, Vasquez had been ousted from the Integrity Commission chairship 'following credible accusations of corruption, impunity, transfer of government assets to private ownership, and nepotism' (S 20). In September 2020, Vasquez also served as chair of SSB, member of the Integrity Commission, and member of the Central Bank, but resigned from these following the scandal (S 20). By end 2020, Vasquez was under investigation by BTL and PM's Office (S 20).)
Jul 2020	Deshawn Arzu-Torres	The outgoing chair of the Integrity Commission (Arzu-Torres) was reappointed to another two-year term. Despite objections by the Opposition and most non-party Senators (alleging Arzu-Torres 'had unsatisfactorily fulfilled her responsibilities and failed to produce [required] reports'), Parliament confirmed the appointment.	–	
Feb 2020	John Saldivar, Lev Dermen	Court documents revealed that the National Security Minister (Saldivar) had received large sums of money from a US citizen (Dermen, accused of tax fraud in the US) in return for political favours.	Saldivar resigned in Feb 2020	(Note: S 20; Am 23i; Amandala 2023c. Saldivar remained an MP for Belmopan (S 20). BPD indicated they would investigate and press charges, but as of October 2020 no charges had been filed (S 20). Dermen convicted, sentenced to 40 years by 2023 (Am 23i). Saldivar designated 'significantly corrupt' by US State on 15 Nov 2022 (Amandala 2023c).)
Jan 2020	Herman Longsworth	An audit of the National Sports Council revealed a number of financial infractions, one of which directly involved the Consul General in New York (Longsworth). The Auditor General reported Longsworth may have illegally used official influence in support of a scheme from which he benefitted.	Longsworth fired in Jan 2020	(Note: S 20. 'The investigation continued as of October [2020]' (S 20).)
Jan 2020	John Briceno, UDP, Dean Barrow, Michael Peyrefitte	During a New Year's address, the Opposition Leader (Briceno) claimed 'the endless landings of drug planes around the country [were] directly tied to ranking members of the [UDP].' The AG (Peyrefitte) demanded a public apology after Briceno failed to disclose evidence for his claim. The PM (Barrow) called the claim 'foolishness' and baseless.	–	(Note: "Twenty-four hours for Opposition Leader to present proof in drug plane allegations". News 5. Belize City. 3 January 2020.; "AG demands public apology from John Briceno for drug plane comment". News 5. Belize City. 7 January 2020.; "Opposition Leader says Attorney General can sue if he so wishes". News 5. Belize City. 8 January 2020.; "PM Barrow responds to allegations made by Leader of the Opposition". News 5. Belize City. 16 January 2020. Briceno sued a UDP member (Moses Barrow) over a rebuttal the latter had made to the former's claim; lost in 2023 (Am 23i; "Belize Supreme Court dismisses lawsuit against Opposition Leader". CNW. Davie, Florida. 6 January 2023.).)

== 2010s ==
Date	Parties	Description	Outcome	Nb
Sep 2019	Reynaldo Verde	Deputy Director of the Tax Service (Verde) was detained overseas for extortion and attempted extortion of a foreign investor in Belize. The investor alleged Verde had requested $350,000 in 2017 to erase taxes the investor owed.	–	(Note: S 19. Verde denied the accusations; continued detained abroad awaiting trial by end 2019 (S 19).)
Jul 2019	Police Commr	The Commissioner of Police instituted a curfew for minors in July in Belize City in response to rising numbers allegedly involved with gangs. The curfew was extended countrywide in September, despite criticism from human rights activists.	–	(Note: S 19. Number of children detained not public by end 2020 (S 20).)
Jul 2019	Dean Barrow	A law firm for the PM (Barrow) informed media that they might face legal action if they broadcast a court document wherein a foreign government agency alleged the firm and PM had knowledge of a land scam involving foreign investors. Opposition criticised the letter, with Senator Osmany Salas calling it 'an attempt to restrain freedom of press.'	–	
Sep 2018	David Chi, Norman Anthony	A police superintendent (Chi) and police corporal (Anthony) were criminally charged with conspiracy to land an airplane on an unauthorised aerodrome and abetment to import cocaine into the country for a 9 September drug plane landing.	Chi and Anthony freed from charges by 2022	(Note: S 18; Am 23i. Court ruled against Chi and Anthony in January 2023 in civil suit (Am 23i).)
Sep 2018	many detainees	Government imposed a 30-day state of emergency in two Belize City neighbourhoods on 4 September, implemented by police officers and soldiers. Early detainees were not charged within seven days of detention, as required by law. HRC expressed 'grave concern' with how the SOE was imposed.	–	(Note: S 18. It was alleged police officers 'arbitrarily detained persons beyond 24 hours without charge, did not take detainees directly to a police station, and used detention as a means of intimidation' prior to SOE (S 18). By end 2018, there was 'no information available' on whether detainees had sought court intervention (S 18).)
May 2018	BTL, Kremandala Ltd	The state-owned telecom provider (BTL) stopped advertising with all outlets of 'one of the most popular media conglomerates in the country' (Kremandala Ltd). BTL claimed this was a general cut on all advertising, but did not reduce advertising with other media firms. Kremandala Ltd media, owned by family of a prominent Opposition member, were known to be critical of the government.	–	
Mar 2018	PUP	Town council election results for San Pedro, Belize were challenged in court by the PUP, but the case was dismissed in 2018 for lack of sufficient evidence to invalidate the results.	–	
Mar 2018	Anthony Martinez	Development Minister (Martinez) was accused by a former employee of setting up a scheme to profit from public funds. The employee alleged Martinez asked for his help in misappropriating funds for low-income housing. Martinez denied the accusations, and despite calls from Opposition, government did not investigate.	–	
Sep 2017	Bar Assn, Kenneth Benjamin	The Bar Association publicly insisted that the Chief Justice (Benjamin) deliver judgments on 30 outstanding civil cases from 2012 to 2015 by year's end or tender his resignation.	CJ fully complied	(Note: S 17; "Bar Association's ultimatum to Chief Justice Benjamin: deliver, resign or be removed!". Amandala. Belize City. 21 September 2017. 'The backlog of civil cases in the Supreme Court continued to be significant' in 2016, despite the introduction of mediation in 2013 (S 16; S 13). To further assist with backlog, an additional justice hired for five-year term, and 39 additional court arbitrators sworn in by Sep 2017 (S 17).))
Sep 2016	Integrity Commn, 10s MPs, PM, LO	Eleven Opposition members filed financial disclosure statements, and called for Government MPs to follow suit, despite the Integrity Commission's dormancy since 2014. After public demonstrations urging good governance measures, the PM and Opposition Leader reconstituted the commission on 30 November.	–	(Note: S 16. By 2016, the Commn 'had been dormant for most of its existence since 1994 and last functioned in 2014' (S 16).)
Aug 2016	Gaspar Vega, Andre Vega, Sharon Pitts	Press revealed an alleged lands hustle involving the former Deputy PM (G Vega). According to leaked documents, during his tenure at the Lands & Surveys Department, G Vega issued titles to privately owned lands to close friends and family for well below market value, thereby forcing the department to compensate them at market value for the 'mistake.' In a notable 2014 instance involving his son (A Vega) and lawyer (Pitts), the department paid compensation valued at $400,000.	Ruled unlawful; appealed in 2020	(Note: S 16; S 17; S 18; S 19; S 20. In 2014, the Dept sold privately owned land to Pitts for $2,500, despite the prior ownership being internally flagged; Pitts sold the same to A Vega for $15,000; the Dept then 'noticed the discrepancy' (two private titles for said land) and compensated the later titleholder (A Vega) at market value ie $400,000 (S 16). G Vega resigned in October 2016 (S 16). By 2018, Pitts entered mediation with government (S 18); on 16 December 2022, Pitts won a civil suit that sought to have her return the compensation (Am 23i).)
Aug 2016	Immigration Dept, vars govt ministers	Three special reports by the Auditor General revealed a pattern of improper and illegal issuances of Belizean visas, passports, and citizenship in 2011–2013 by the Immigration & Nationality Department, and named at least twelve former and sitting government ministers as allegedly 'interfering' with such issuances. A Senate select committee held hearings in 2017, and submitted their report and recommendations in 2020. By October 2020 no charges had been filed against anyone.	–	
Aug 2016	Julius Espat, Michael Peyrefitte	An MP (Espat) was ordered by the Speaker (Peyrefitte) to vacate the chambers during a session for 'disregarding the rules of conduct in Parliament.' When Espat refused, he was forcibly removed by police officers and suspended for five months. Police also forcibly removed press from the gallery, 'with the obvious intention of preventing them from capturing footage of them manhandling Espat' per Amandala.	Ruled unconstitutional in Aug 2021	(Note: S 21; "Julius Espat, media ejected from House sitting". BBN. San Ignacio, Belize. 26 August 2016.; "House Speaker kicks out Julius Espat!". Amandala. Belize City. 31 August 2016. Suspension ruled unconstitutional by Supreme Court (S 21). 'Espat and Peyrefitte had disagreed in the past, especially when Espat intended to question the actions of the then government for perceived acts of corruption' (S 21).)
Jul 2016	Myrtle Palacio, Guardian	PUP Secretary General (Palacio) sued the UDP paper The Guardian for depicting her practicing and endorsing witchcraft in a cartoon. Palacio argued it was an attack on her reputation and Garifuna culture.	Ruled against Palacio in 2016	
Apr 2016	–	Government, via statutory instrument, prohibited access to Sarstoon for 30 days to ease border tensions with Guatemala. The SI's constitutionality was widely questioned.	Lifted four days early	(Note: S 16. SI 'lifted four days before it was set to expire due to public pressure' (S 16).)
Apr 2015	PM, Treasury, two employees	The PM announced $500,000 was missing from the Treasury. A joint investigation by police and the Finance Ministry led to the arrest and charging of two government employees.	–	
Jul 2014	one person	Two NGOs protested the appointment of an individual to an immigration committee charged with reviewing applications for temporary stays in the country. The NGOs cited the member's lack of cooperation with the Auditor General's investigation into immigration scandals in 2013.	–	
May 2014	Health Min	The Auditor General uncovered the mismanagement of hundreds of thousands of dollars of government funds by Ministry of Health officials. One official was dismissed, another transferred, and two others suspended pending PSC hearings.	–	(Note: S 14; "Health CEO Allen responds to that damning SRH audit". 7 News. Belize City. 9 May 2014. PSC hearings were still pending by end 2014 (S 14).)
Mar 2014	Catholic Ch, vars NGOs	The Catholic Church barred all its schools (including government-aided ones) from cooperating with various NGOs engaged in HIV prevention work, citing their 'agenda of sodomy, abortion, and sexual-gender redefinition' which sought to 'radically change Belize's Christian character.'	–	
Mar 2014	Lands Dept	Lands & Surveys Department documents were leaked that indicated questionable lands transactions. Press reported numerous instances of department employees cancelling leases without due notice and fraudulently transferring titles without consent. The PM and Lands Commissioner 'criticised pervasive corruption' in the Department. The department was further accused of illegally distributing lands to political party associates, but government 'insisted it maintained transparency in the distribution of land.'	–	(Note: S 14; S 15; S 16; S 17; S 18; S 19; "Lands Commissioner: 'Only God can clean up the corruption'". News 5. Belize City. 5 March 2014.; "UDP land hustlers swindled lease". 7 News. Belize City. 13 March 2014. Allegations against Dept continued to 2018 (S 18). In August 2014, government pledged to 'improve customer service and security of files, investigate misconduct by public officers, and enact measures to improve accountability' in the Department (S 14).)
Mar 2014	KHMH	The Pharmacy Association protested against the hiring of a minister's daughter as a drug inspector at the public Karl Heusner Memorial Hospital.	–	
Jan 2014	Aviation Auth, Edmond Castro	The Aviation Authority was publicly accused of handing money to the Aviation Minister (Castro) for his personal use. The PM and BAA declined to officially label this as corruption. Castro was stripped of his portfolio, and all BAA board members resigned.	BAA board resigned in 2014; Castro ousted in 2014	(Note: S 14; "BAA: Castro's cookie jar?". 7 News. Belize City. 13 January 2014.; "Castro stripped of Civil Aviation portfolio!". Amandala. Belize City. 31 January 2014. Castro used the BAA funds for his mother's funeral and to support his constituents (S 14). 'Government reviewed operational protocols' post-scandal (S 14).)
Nov 2013	Edmond Castro	An MP (Castro) was publicly named by a whistleblower as being involved in the sale of Belizean visas. Castro sued them and the broadcaster, but dropped the suit in July 2015.	–	(Note: S 14; S 15; "Whistleblower goes into details on visa facilitated procedure involving Minister Castro". News 5. Belize City. 13 November 2013.; "Was Hon. Castro?". 7 News. Belize City. 13 November 2013. Court ordered Castro cover circa $30,000 in defendants' legal costs (S 15).)
Sep 2013	Elvin Penner	An investigation uncovered allegations that a minister of state (Penner) had illegally assisted a foreigner to obtain citizenship and receive a Belizean passport. Penner was ousted from Cabinet in September 2013, and charged with two immigration offences in March 2014. Charges were dropped in July 2014 for lack of evidence.	Penner ousted in Sep 2013, charged in Mar 2014	(Note: S 13; S 14. Penner remained an MP but attended no sessions afterwards (S 14). The Auditor General denied a FOI Act request by COLA (Citizens Organised for Liberty through Action) for their report on Penner, noting reports could only be published after being laid before Parliament; the Ombudsman upheld the denial in 2014 (S 14).)
Sep 2013	Pub Accts Comm	Two Opposition members (including the chair) boycotted the bipartisan Public Accounts Committee (convened to evaluate and make recommendations on the Auditor General's reports on public spending), alleging Government members were 'improperly handling the issue.'	–	(Note: S 13; "Public Accounts Committee meets in Belmopan, Chairman and Opposition Members walk out". News 5. Belize City. 4 September 2013.; "Saldivar Clears Up PAC Schedule". 7 News. Belize City. 5 September 2013. First convening of PAC (S 13).)
May 2013	Women's Commn	The Women's Commission added sexual orientation as a protected status to their Gender Policy, launched in May. Marches against this portion of the Policy were held throughout the country, often with hundreds participating. The PM and Special Envoy for Women & Children separately gave public remarks in support of 'equal rights for all.'	–	(Note: S 13. First time such remarks were made by high-level public officials (S 13). One march featured a figure hanging from a noose with 'UNIBAM' inscribed on its chest (S 13). A transgender fashion show was rescheduled over safety concerns (S 13).)
May 2013	KHMH	The public Karl Heusner Memorial Hospital was accused of gross negligence when 13 babies died while in their NICU. Five families settled with the hospital in September 2014.	–	
Feb 2013	Mark King	A minister of state (King) was suspended without pay from Cabinet for three months after allegedly punching a police officer and brawling in public while intoxicated. Authorities cleared King of the charges in June 2013.	King suspended	
Dec 2012	–	Government imposed a moratorium on naturalisations of Guatemalan citizens, in response to complaints that dual citizenship for Guatemalans was constitutionally barred (whereas Guatemala did not have a formal renunciation process for citizens).	–	(Note: S 18; "Belize putting a hold on giving Guatemalans nationality". 7 News. Belize City. 12 December 2012. Still enforced by 2018 (S 18).)
Nov 2012	–	Government designated five Belize City neighbourhoods as crime ridden per the Crime Control and Criminal Justice Act. Police searched more than 200 persons before the searches were approved and gazetted as required by law.	–	(Note: S 12; S 13. First use of this CCCJ Act designation; use extended to Jan 2013 (S 13). Residents reported excessive force by police during searches (S 13).)
Aug 2012	Immigration Dept	A fugitive obtained a valid passport using the birth certificate of a deceased child. The Immigration & Nationality Department closed their Belize City office and suspended the issuance of emergency passports pending an investigation.	–	
Mar 2012	Belize CitCo	Authorities fired a Belize City Council employee amid allegations that she fraudulently misappropriated council funds by issuing false overtime payments, excess salary, and salary adjustments to employees who did not receive any such monies.	Employee fired in Mar 2012	
Mar 2012	PUP, UDP	Parliamentary election results for four constituencies were challenged in court by the PUP (three) and UDP (one). Results were upheld in court in all four cases.	–	
Feb 2012	–	Parliament passed an amendment to the Crime Control and Criminal Justice Act allowing for unlimited areas to be designated as crime ridden. The original and amended Act gave law enforcement expanded powers to execute searches in and restrict movement in and into areas so designated.	–	(Note: S 13. Act further expanded in Dec 2012 to allow crime ridden designation to cover an indefinite area and remain active longer (S 13).)
Dec 2011	Denis Hanomansingh	Press reported on 21 December that a Supreme Court Justice (Hanomansingh) ruled that a 36-year-old man accused of carnal knowledge (rape) of a 14-year-old girl had to marry his alleged victim to receive bail.	–	
Dec 2011	KHMH	A Karl Heusner Memorial Hospital memo leaked to press on 22 December alleged corrupt hiring and procurement practices at the hospital.	–	
Dec 2011	PM, Ombuds	The PM did not appoint a new Ombudsman when the Office vacated, leading to a 13-month vacancy.	New Ombudsman appointed in Nov 2012, took office in Jan 2013	(Note: S 12. The Office had failed to present their annual reports for 2009–2011 by end 2012 (S 12). A staff of two kept the Office functional (S 12).)
Nov 2011	Magistrates' Ct	A San Pedro Magistrates' Court employee was arrested and charged with five counts of forgery.	Employee charged in 2011	
Aug 2011	–	Parliament passed an Act to require nonjury trials in criminal cases involving murder, attempted murder, abetment of murder, and conspiracy to commit murder charges. Legal practitioners and human rights activists publicly opposed the Act.	–	(Note: S 11; S 12; S 13. First trial without jury held in March 2012; CJ convicted a 20 year old of the attempted murder of a high-profile lawyer (S 12).)
Jul 2011	Forest Dept	Several NGOs accused the Forest Department of ignoring or facilitating the illegal trade of rosewood.	–	
Jun 2011	BEL	The national power provider (Belize Electricity Ltd) is nationalised.	Compensation settled in 2016	
May 2011	–	Government tabled a bill in Parliament that would allow for preventive detention by law enforcement. It was withdrawn it after public opposition.	Bill withdrawn in 2011	
Dec 2010	–	Parliament passed the Interception of Communications Act 2010, allowing law enforcement to intercept voice, fax, and digital communications in the interest of 'national security, public order, public morals, and public safety.' Government called the measures 'necessary to the war on crime,' but the Opposition and other observers criticised them as being too broad in scope and subject to abuse.	–	
Nov 2010	four policemen	Four police officers were arrested on drug charges. The jury were instructed to dismiss the case due to a lack of evidence in December 2012.	Case dismissed in Dec 2012	
Oct 2010	Immigration Dept	Six immigration officials were charged with offences relating to the transit of 33 Chinese nationals through the country in September and October 2010. A preliminary inquiry found there was insufficient evidence to proceed with prosecution in July 2011, though the case remained under investigation by year's end.	Six officers charged in Oct 2010	(Note: S 10; S 11. Immigration Director transferred to another office in December 2010, though PM stated move was not disciplinary (S 10).)
Feb 2010	Belize CitCo	Three Belize City Council employees were detained for misappropriation of $60,000 during November 2009 to February 2010. An Audit Department investigation continued at year's end. Police reportedly recovered a portion of the funds.	–	

== 2000s ==
Date	Parties	Description	Outcome	Nb
Aug 2009	BTL	The national telecoms provider (Belize Telecommunications Ltd) is nationalised.	Compensation settled in Aug 2015	(Note: S 15; S 17; "What does nationalization mean for B.T.L.?". News 5. Belize City. 25 August 2009. Final payment of $156 million made by 10 November 2017, per CCJ order (S 17).)
Jul 2009	Zenaida Moya, Belize CitCo	The Belize City Mayor (Moya), and two members and one employee of the City Council, were charged with 22 counts of uttering false documents and two counts of failing to comply with accounting regulations in relation to the council's payment of $1,540, ostensibly for gasoline. The court dismissed all charges in October and November 2010.	Three councillors charged in 2009; cases dismissed in 2010	(Note: S 10; "Mayor Moya explains the missing money". 7 News. Belize City. 13 July 2009. Moya expelled from political party but continued as mayor by 2010 (S 10). The Council employee died before court proceedings (S 10).)
Dec 2003	Said Musa	US immunity agreement (to not surrender their nationals to the ICC) signed.	–	
Sep 2001	Immigration Min, five unionists	Five trade unionists (banana workers, including two Belizeans) expelled to Honduras by Immigration Minister on 5 September, allegedly due to union activities.	Expulsion orders revoked on 7 Sep	

== Notes and references ==
=== References ===
1. Annual Reports (Report). London: AI. 1962–2025.
2. Special Reports (Report). Belmopan, Belize: Auditor Genl. 2008–2016.
3. Country Reports on Human Rights Practices (Report). Washington, DC: GPO. 1977–2025. HathiTrust 000062477. This article incorporates text from this source, which is in the public domain.
4. "Year in review". Amandala. Belize City. 2004–2024.
5. "Timeline of unrest in Belize". Amandala. Belize City. 27 September 2005.
6. Year in review. News 5. Belize City. 2013–2024. Channel 5.
7. "Saldivar victorious". Amandala. Belize City. 8 February 2023.
