= Chester Williams (police officer) =

Belizean police officer (born 1973)

Chester Williams (born 1973) is the Commissioner of Belize and the highest police officer of the Belize Police Department. His rapid rise through its ranks was interrupted by accusations that he had committed a murder. Despite the objections of the Solicitor-General, who resigned and left the country in protest, the government of Belize moved to discipline Williams, and he was reduced in rank for six months. The accusations were not resolved until it was revealed that his alleged victim was alive and in the United States, something which had been known to his superiors for some time. Thus vindicated, Williams took up a new post as Officer Commanding the Cayo District Police, but the following month announced that he would be taking study leave in order to attend law school.

On January 8, 2019, the government announced it would be appointing Williams as Commissioner of Police to replace the outgoing Allen Whylie. He was sworn in on January 16.

== Career ==
=== Rising star hit by accusations ===
In March 2007, Williams, then the leader of the Crime Investigation Branch, was accused by one of his senior officers of having raped her in September 2006. An investigation was commenced, but Lutchman Sooknandan, Director of Public Prosecutions concluded there was insufficient evidence to bring charges. Williams continued his rise through the police, facing allegations of protecting friends and associates, such as Ben Bou-Nehra, from charges, to become Senior Superintendent by 2008.

Williams began to run into more trouble after the February 2008 election in which the United Democratic Party took power. The following month, he was implicated in the murder of Jermaine Fuentes, whose remains were found near the Coastal Highway. He was also alleged to have made death threats against fellow police officer Edward Broaster. As a result, he was transferred to a desk job in Belmopan. In media comments in that month, he denied all the allegations against him and described them as part of a campaign of political victimisation due to the perception that he was a People's United Party supporter. This perception had been brewing for several months, partly due to a pre-election incident in which he filed suit against UDP politician Mark King for use of indecent language during a confrontation over a campaign sign.

Williams was transferred to a new position following the murder and death threat allegations, which he went to the Supreme Court to challenge as being in effect a demotion. Justice Samuel Awich was scheduled to hear his case. In early May 2008, Solicitor-General Tanya Herwanger issued a legal opinion stating that the government's case against Williams was "fatally flawed" and that it may have been politically motivated through the involvement of Commissioner of Police Carlos Perdomo and Minister of Public Service John Saldivar. PM Dean Barrow described Herwanger's comments as "completely out of order". Herwanger resigned from her position as SG soon after, and left Belize entirely. In July, Williams filed a further complaint with police in late June 2008, alleging that the alleged remains of Fuentes showed signs of having been subject to an autopsy already (suggesting they had been planted), and also providing a copy of a statement made to the Director of Public Prosecutions made by one of his accusers admitting that he accused Williams only because he felt his own life would be in danger if he did not. In August 2008, he reported for his new job as Director of Training, with a reduction in rank to Superintendent.

=== Reinstatement and study leave ===
Williams appealed his reduction in rank to the Belize Advisory Council; attorneys Ellis Arnold and former SG Edwin Flowers appeared on his behalf. In December, his appeal was allowed and he was reinstated to his former rank of Senior Superintendent. There were still public perceptions that Williams had done something improper, but these were washed away in May 2010 when it was revealed that the man Williams had been accused of murdering, Jermaine Fuentes, was actually alive and living in the United States, and furthermore that police had been aware of the matter for quite some time.

In August 2010, Williams took up a new position as Officer Commanding in Cayo District. However, just one month later, Williams announced that he and fellow senior officer Bart Jones were putting down their badges temporarily to study for LL.B.s at the University of the West Indies Cave Hill, Barbados and then Legal Education Certificates at the Norman Manley Law School in Jamaica. Williams said that he intended to rejoin the police department in a legal capacity after his return five years hence. Williams planned to finance his first year of studies himself, but hoped that he could obtain a government scholarship in future years.

Williams continued to hold his post as O.C. of the San Ignacio and Cayo police formations, being marked formally as on leave without pay but returning during school holidays to continue his work. Claudio Mal holds command of the San Ignacio police in his absence. On one such break he oversaw the opening of the San Ignacio police's "drop-in center", a study hall with computers and internet connection intended for the use of students and teachers, which he hoped could help improve relations between the police and the community at large. During his summer vacation after successfully completing the first year of his LL.B., he went to the Prosecution Branch in Belize City to offer assistance and learn first-hand about prosecutorial work.

== Personal life ==
Williams was born in Seine Bight, Stann Creek District. He was one of seven children in a family headed by a single mother, and had to drop out of formal education after primary school. While a police officer he completed a high school degree at St. John's College Extension School, and went on to St. John's School of Professional Studies to complete an associate degree in criminal justice.
