= Dupuch =

Dupuch is a surname. Notable people with the surname include:

- Antoine-Adolphe Dupuch (1800–1856), French Roman Catholic priest
- Étienne Dupuch (1899–1991), Bahamian journalist
- Eugene Dupuch, Bahamian journalist, lawyer and politician
  - Eugene Dupuch Law School
- Joël Dupuch, French oyster farmer
- Michel Dupuch, French diplomat and government official
