= List of central government entities in Belize =

The central government of Belize is divided into departments that each have responsibility, according to the government, for putting government policy into practice. As of June 2025, there are currently one regnal department, 20 ministerial departments, 16 non-ministerial departments, and over 104 agencies and other public bodies, for a total of over 141 departments. (Note: This article follows the Gov.uk classification in Gov.uk a and Gov.uk 2025b as closely as possible, so uses government to mean the Crown in its executive capacity only (so parliamentary and judicial entities are not listed). Similarly, entities within regnal, ministerial, and non-ministerial departments which are not arm's-length bodies are not listed, nor are various possibly associated entities (like some for- and not-for-profits, and all non-central government entities). Notes and short citations provided in Cf columns.)

== Regnal departments ==
Regnal departments are those which are of or pertain to the Sovereign in their executive capacity. A list of all regnal departments is shown below.

Regnal department	Viceroy responsible	Civil servant(s) responsible	Cf
Governor General's Office; Office of the Governor General	HE Dame Froyla Tzalam GCMG; Governor General	Aeshia McFadzean; Administrative Officer	(Note: Foreign Ministry 2022, p. 192; Substantive Laws 2020, ch. 4, ss. 30-35.)

== Ministerial departments ==
Ministerial departments are generally the most high-profile government departments and differ from the other three types of government departments in that they include ministers. A list of all ministerial departments is shown below.

Ministerial department	Minister responsible	Civil servant(s) responsible	Cf
Prime Minister's Office; Office of the Prime Minister	Hon John Briceno; Prime Minister	Narda Garcia; Chief Executive Officer	(Note: Press Office 2025b; Press Office 2025c; Foreign Ministry 2022, pp. 192–193.)
Cabinet Office; Cabinet Office	Hon John Briceno; Prime Minister	HE Amb Stuart Leslie; Secretary to the Cabinet	(Note: Press Office 2025b; Foreign Ministry 2022, p. 192.)
Attorney General's Ministry; Attorney General's Ministry	Anthony Sylvestre SC; Attorney General	Elisa Montalvo; Solicitor General	(Note: Press Office 2025b; Foreign Ministry 2022, p. 205.)
Ministry of Foreign Affairs; Ministry of Foreign Affairs, Foreign Trade, Culture and Immigration	Hon Francis Fonseca; Minister of Foreign Affairs, Foreign Trade, Culture and Immigration	HE Amb Amalia Mai; Chief Executive Officer for Foreign Affairs, Foreign Trade and Culture Tanya Santos Neal; Chief Executive Officer for Immigration	(Note: Press Office 2025b; Press Office 2025c; Foreign Ministry 2022, pp. 10–11, 203–205.)
Ministry of Home Affairs; Ministry of Home Affairs and New Growth Industries	Hon Kareem Musa; Minister of Home Affairs and New Growth Industries	Sharole Saldivar; Chief Executive Officer	(Note: Press Office 2025b; Press Office 2025c; Foreign Ministry 2022, pp. 200–201.)
Ministry of Finance; Ministry of Finance, Investment, Economic Transformation, Civil Aviation and E-Governance	Hon John Briceno; Minister of Finance, Investment, Economic Transformation, Civil Aviation and E-Governance	Joseph Waight; Financial Secretary Narda Garcia; Chief Executive Officer for Investment and Civil Aviation Carlos Pol; Chief Executive Officer for Economic Transformation Jose Urbina; Chief Executive Officer for E-Governance	(Note: Press Office 2025b; Press Office 2025c; Foreign Ministry 2022, pp. 192–193.)
Ministry of Natural Resources; Ministry of Natural Resources, Petroleum and Mining	Hon Cordel Hyde; Minister of Natural Resources, Petroleum and Mining	Paul Thompson; Chief Executive Officer	(Note: Press Office 2025b; Press Office 2025c; Foreign Ministry 2022, pp. 194–195.)
Ministry of Agriculture; Ministry of Agriculture, Food Security and Enterprise	Hon Jose Abelardo Mai; Minister of Agriculture, Food Security and Enterprise	Servulo Baeza; Chief Executive Officer	(Note: Press Office 2025b; Press Office 2025c; Foreign Ministry 2022, p. 195.)
Ministry of Public Utilities; Ministry of Public Utilities, Energy and Logistics	Hon Michel Chebat; Minister of Public Utilities, Energy and Logistics	Dr Leroy Almendarez; Chief Executive Officer	(Note: Press Office 2025b; "OPM announces appointment of new CEO" (Press release). Belmopan, Belize: Press Office. 9 April 2025. PR 047-25.; Foreign Ministry 2022, p. 195-196.)
Ministry of Works; Ministry of Infrastructure Development and Housing	Hon Julius Espat; Minister of Infrastructure Development and Housing	Victor Espat; Chief Executive Officer	(Note: Press Office 2025b; Press Office 2025c; Foreign Ministry 2022, p. 196.)
Ministry of Education; Ministry of Education, Science and Technology	Hon Oscar Requena; Minister of Education, Science and Technology	Dian Castillo Maheia; Chief Executive Officer	(Note: Press Office 2025b; Press Office 2025c; Foreign Ministry 2022, pp. 196–197.)
Ministry of Defence; Ministry of National Defence and Border Security	Hon Oscar Mira; Minister of National Defence and Border Security	Francis Usher; Chief Executive Officer	(Note: Press Office 2025b; Press Office 2025c; Foreign Ministry 2022, pp. 197–198.)
Ministry of Labour; Ministry of Rural Transformation, Community Development, Labour and Local Government	Hon Florencio Marin; Minister of Rural Transformation, Community Development, Labour and Local Government	Dr Valentino Shal; Chief Executive Officer	(Note: Press Office 2025b; Press Office 2025c; Foreign Ministry 2022, pp. 198–199.)
Ministry of Human Development; Ministry of Human Development, Family Support and Gender Affairs	Hon Thea Garcia-Ramirez; Minister of Human Development, Family Support and Gender Affairs	Adele Catzim; Chief Executive Officer	(Note: Press Office 2025b; Press Office 2025c; Foreign Ministry 2022, pp. 199–200.)
Ministry of the Environment; Ministry of Sustainable Development, Climate Change and Solid Waste Management	Hon Orlando Habet; Minister of Sustainable Development, Climate Change and Solid Waste Management	Milagro Matus; Chief Executive Officer	(Note: Press Office 2025b; Press Office 2025c; Foreign Ministry 2022, p. 201.)
Ministry of Health; Ministry of Health and Wellness	Hon Kevin Bernard; Minister of Health and Wellness	Dr Julio Sabido; Chief Executive Officer	(Note: Press Office 2025b; Press Office 2025c; Foreign Ministry 2022, pp. 201–202.)
Ministry of Tourism; Ministry of Tourism, Youth, Sports and Diaspora Relations	Hon Anthony Mahler; Minister of Tourism, Youth, Sports and Diaspora Relations	Nicole Usher Solano; Chief Executive Officer	(Note: Press Office 2025b; Press Office 2025c; Foreign Ministry 2022, p. 202.)
Ministry of the Economy; Ministry of the Blue Economy and Marine Conservation	Hon Andre Perez; Minister of the Blue Economy and Marine Conservation	Beverly Wade; Chief Executive Officer	(Note: Press Office 2025b; Press Office 2025c; Foreign Ministry 2022, p. 203.)
Ministry of the Public Service; Ministry of the Public Service, Governance and the National Emergency Management Organisation	Hon Henry Charles Usher; Minister of the Public Service, Governance and the National Emergency Management Organisation	Rolando Zetina; Chief Executive Officer	(Note: Press Office 2025b; Press Office 2025c; Foreign Ministry 2022, p. 203.)
Ministry of Transport; Ministry of Constitutional, Religious and Indigenous Affairs and Transportation	Hon Dr Louis Zabaneh; Minister of Constitutional, Religious and Indigenous Affairs and Transportation	Chester Williams; Chief Executive Officer	

== Non-ministerial departments ==
Non-ministerial departments are headed by senior civil servants and not ministers. They usually have a regulatory or inspectorial function. All are both arm's-length and statutory bodies. A list of all non-ministerial departments is shown below.

Non-ministerial department	Civil servant(s) responsible	Cf
Director of Public Prosecutions' Office; Office of the Director of Public Prosecutions	Cheryl-Lynn Vidal SC; Director of Public Prosecutions	(Note: Substantive Laws 2020, ch. 4, ss. 50, 108; "Cheryl-Lynn Vidal". Bristol, England: Commonwealth Lawyer Assn.)
Auditor General's Office; Office of the Auditor General	Maria Rodriguez; Auditor General	(Note: Substantive Laws 2020, ch. 4, ss. 109, 120; "Auditor General". Belmopan, Belize: Office of Auditor Genl.)
Public Services Commission; Public Services Commission	Diana Price Murillo; Chairperson	(Note: Substantive Laws 2020, ch. 4, s. 105; "Powers of Public Service Commission delegated". 7 News. Belize City. 23 March 2023.)
Advisory Council; Belize Advisory Council	Rene Villanueva; Chairperson	(Note: Substantive Laws 2020, ch. 4, s. 54; McKoy v BAC [2023] BZSC 143 at para. 18, Supreme Court (Belize))
Elections and Boundaries Commission; Elections and Boundaries Commission	Oscar Sabido Puga; Chairperson	
Security Services Commission; Security Services Commission	Diana Price Murillo; Chairperson	(Note: Substantive Laws 2020, ch. 4, s. 110.)
Judicial and Legal Services Commission; Judicial and Legal Services Commission	Hon Mde Louise Blenman; Chairperson	(Note: Substantive Laws 2020, ch. 4, s. 110; "High court and political power: Jeremy Enriquez vs the judiciary". Natl Perspective. Belize City. 25 April 2025. Archived from the original on 25 May 2025.)
Ombudsman's Office; Office of the Ombudsman	Hon Mjr (Retd) H Gilbert Swaso JP CMMS; Ombudsman	
Contractor General's Office; Office of the Contractor General	Maria Arthurs; Contractor General	
Social Security Investment Committee; Social Security Investment Committee	Reynaldo Magana; Chairperson	
Integrity Commission; Integrity Commission	Andrea McSweaney McKoy; Chairperson	(Note: Substantive Laws 2020, ch. 105; "Government minister urges elected Representatives to declare wealth". Love News. Belize City. 3 October 2023.)
Nature Conservation Foundation; Belize Nature Conservation Foundation (BNCF)	Leonardo Chavarria; Chairperson	(Note: Substantive Laws 2020, ch. 218, s. 32; "Belize Nature Conservation Foundation awards BZ$100,000 to protected areas co-managers" (Press release). Belmopan, Belize: PACT. 20 March 2025.; Protected Areas Conservation Trust 2025l. Formerly PACT Foundation (Protected Areas Conservation Trust 2025l).)
Public Utilities Commission; Public Utilities Commission (PUC)	Dean Molina; Chairperson	(Note: Substantive Laws 2020, ch. 223; "Commissioners". Belize City: PUC.)
AIDS Commission; National AIDS Commission (NAC)	Dr Giovanni Solorzano; Chairperson	
Social Investment Fund; Belize Social Investment Fund (BSIF)	Carlos Tun; Executive Director	
Coastal Zone Management; Coastal Zone Management Authority and Institute (CZMAI)	Chantalle Samuels; Chief Executive Officer of the Authority Arlene Young; Director of the Institute	(Note: Substantive Laws 2020, ch. 329; "CZM Authority & CZM Institute". Belize City: CZMAI.; "The CZMAI Team". Belize City: CZMAI.)

== Agencies and other public bodies ==
Government departments in this fourth and final category may be split into two types:

1. Executive agencies – part of government departments and usually provide government services rather than decide policy, (Note: Gov.uk a. Administratively distinct, but legally still part of its parent department (Gov.uk 2025b). Acts as an arm of its home department (Gov.uk 2025b, handbook, pt. 1, p. 8). Focus on providing specific deliverables to parent (Gov.uk 2025b).)
2. Non-departmental public bodies – have varying degrees of independence but are directly accountable to ministers. (Note: Gov.uk a. Not legally part of a government department (Gov.uk 2025b). Operates separately from its sponsoring department (Gov.uk 2025b, handbook, pt. 1, p. 8).)

All are arm's-length bodies, but only some are statutory ones. A list of some agencies and other public bodies is shown below.

Parent or oversight department	Agencies or bodies	Cf
Governor General's Office	Advisory Committee; National Honours and Awards Advisory Committee	(Note: Finance Ministry 2025b, p. 17-21; Substantive Laws 2020, ch. 162, s. 4)
Ministry of the Public Service	Elections and Boundaries Department; Department of Elections and Boundaries Emergency Management Office; Office of Emergency Management Fire Service; National Fire Service Met Service; National Meteorological Service NEMO; National Emergency Management Organisation (NEMO) Joint Staff Relations Council; Joint Staff Relations Council Services Commissions' Office; Office of the Services Commissions	(Note: Finance Ministry 2025b, pp. 41–63, 398–402; Substantive Laws 2020, ch. 145; "Ministry overview". Belmopan, Belize: Min Pub Serv.)
Director of Public Prosecutions' Office	Crown Prosecution Service; Crown Prosecution Service	(Note: Finance Ministry 2025b, pp. 64–67, 398–402.)
Prime Minister's Office	E-Governance Department; Department of E-Governance and Digitisation Press Office; Government Information Service National Security Council; National Security Directorate Broadcasting Authority; Belize Broadcasting Authority (BBA) RESTORE Belize; Restore Belize Social Assistance Programme (RESTORE Belize) Financial Intelligence Unit; Financial Intelligence Unit Economic Development Council; Economic Development Council	(Note: Finance Ministry 2025b, pp. 72–93, 398–402; Substantive Laws 2020, ch. 138.02, 285.)
Ministry of Finance	Treasury; Treasury Department Customs Department; Department of Customs and Excise Aviation Department; Department of Civil Aviation Tax Service; Belize Tax Service (BTS) Insurance Supervisor's Office; Office of the Supervisor of Insurance and Private Pensions (OSIPP) IT Office; Central Information Technology Office (CITO) Ship Registry; International Merchant Marine Registry of Belize (IMMARBE) High Seas Fisheries Unit; The Belize High Seas Fisheries Unit (HSFU) Procurement Unit; The Procurement Unit Social Security; Social Security Board (SSB) Statistical Institute; Statistical Institute of Belize (SIB) Airports Authority; Belize Airports Authority Central Bank; Central Bank of Belize Financial Services Commission; Financial Services Commission (FSC) DFC; Development Finance Corporation (DFC) BELTRAIDE; Belize Trade and Development Service (BELTRAIDE)	(Note: Finance Ministry 2025b, pp. 1, 72–125, 285–289, 398–402; Substantive Laws 2020, chs. 44, 158, 238, 262, 272, 279, 282; "Board of Directors". Belmopan, Belize: SSB.; "Organisation". Belmopan, Belize: SIB.; "The Financial Services Commission". Belmopan, Belize: FSC.; "About us". Belmopan, Belize: BELTRAIDE.; "Services". Belmopan, Belize: Fin Min.; "About us". Belmopan, Belize: Min Econ Dev.)
Ministry of Health	Nursing Department; Nursing Department Health Service; Office of the Director of Health Service Drug Inspectorate; The Drug Inspectorate Unit Medical Laboratory Service; Central Medical Laboratory Service Health Insurance; National Health Insurance (NHI) Drug Abuse Council; National Drug Abuse Control Council (NDACC) Education and Community Bureau; Health Education and Community Participation Bureau (HECOPAB) KHMH Authority; Karl Heusner Memorial Hospital Authority (KHMHA)	(Note: Finance Ministry 2025b, pp. 126–138, 398–402; Substantive Laws 2020, ch. 38; "Service areas". Belmopan, Belize: Min Health. Archived from the original on 24 August 2024.)
Ministry of Foreign Affairs	Immigration Department; Department of Immigration and Nationality Services Refugees Department; Department of Refugees Directorate General for Foreign Trade; Directorate General for Foreign Trade (DGFT) Archives and Records Service; Belize Archives and Records Service (BARS) Institute of Culture and History; National Institute of Culture and History (NICH) International Cooperation Council; International Cooperation Council (ICC)	(Note: Finance Ministry 2025b, pp. 139–154, 398–402; "Directory". Belmopan, Belize: Min Foreign.; "The Ministry". Belmopan, Belize: Min Immigration.)
Ministry of Education	Library Service; Belize National Library Service and Information System (BNLSIS) Accreditation Council; National Accreditation Council UB; University of Belize	(Note: Finance Ministry 2025b, pp. 155–174, 398–402; Substantive Laws 2020, ch. 37, 39.01.)
Ministry of Agriculture	Agriculture Department; Department of Agriculture Cooperatives Department; Department of Cooperatives Food and Nutrition Commission; National Food and Nutrition Security Commission Bureau of Standards; Belize Bureau of Standards (BBS) Aquaculture Unit; The Aquaculture Unit Pesticides Control Board; Pesticides Control Board Agricultural Health Authority; Belize Agricultural Health Authority (BAHA) Marketing and Development Corp; Belize Marketing and Development Corporation (BMDC)	(Note: Finance Ministry 2025b, pp. 175–193, 398–402; Substantive Laws 2020, chs. 211, 216, 281; "Home". Orange Walk, Belize: BMDC.; "Agriculture units". Belmopan, Belize: Min Agriculture. 13 April 2017.; "Statutory bodies". Belmopan, Belize: Min Agriculture. 27 March 2017.)
Ministry of Natural Resources	Lands Department; Department of Lands and Surveys Land Registry; Land Registry Department Geology Department; Department of Geology and Petroleum Mining Unit; The Mining Unit	(Note: Finance Ministry 2025b, pp. 194–204, 398–402; "About Ministry". Belmopan, Belize: Min Natural Resources.)
Ministry of Tourism	Youth Department; Department of Youth Services Sports Council; National Sports Council (NSC) Diaspora Relations Unit; The Diaspora Relations Unit Border Management Agency; Border Management Agency (BMA) Tourism Board; Belize Tourism Board (BTB)	(Note: Finance Ministry 2025b, pp. 205–216, 398–402; Substantive Laws 2020, ch. 144, 275; "Statutory bodies". Belize City: Min Tourism.; "Our team". Belize City: Min Tourism.)
Ministry of the Environment	Department of Environment; Department of the Environment (DOE) Forest Department; Department of Forestry Solid Waste Management Authority; Belize Solid Waste Management Authority (BSWaMA) Hydrological Service; National Hydrological Service PACT; Protected Areas Conservation Truest (PACT) Biodiversity Office; National Biodiversity Office Climate Change Office; National Climate Change Office	(Note: Finance Ministry 2025b, pp. 217–228, 398–402; Substantive Laws 2020, ch. 218; "Departments overview". Belmopan, Belize: Min Sustainable Dev.)
Ministry of Human Development	Department of Human Services; Department of Human Services (DHS) Women's Department; Women and Family Support Department Community Rehabilitation Department; Community Rehabilitation Department (CRD) Special Envoy for Women and Children; Office of the Special Envoy for the Development of Families and Children Social Services Inspectorate; Inspectorate of Social Service Institutions Women's Commission; National Women's Commission	(Note: Finance Ministry 2025b, pp. 229–242, 398–402; Acts 2024w, 1 of 2024.)
Ministry of Public Utilities	Post Office; Belize Postal Service Port Authority; Belize Port Authority (BPA) Energy Unit; The Energy Unit	(Note: Finance Ministry 2025b, pp. 243–250, 398–402; Substantive Laws 2020, ch. 233; "Meet our Minister". Belize City: BPA.; "Ministry's portfolio". Belmopan, Belize: Min Pub Utilities.; "Senior management". Belmopan, Belize: Min Pub Utilities.)
Ministry of Works	Housing Department; Department of Housing Works Department; Public Works Department Building Authority; Central Building Authority (CBA)	(Note: Finance Ministry 2025b, pp. 251–262, 398–402; Substantive Laws 2020, ch. 131.)
Ministry of Home Affairs	Police Department; Belize Police Department (BPD) Prison Service; Belize Prison Service Forensics Service; Belize National Forensic Science Service (NFSS) Crime Observatory; Belize Crime Observatory (BCO) Firearms Board; Firarms and Ammunition Control Board	(Note: Finance Ministry 2025b, pp. 263–274, 398–402; Substantive Laws 2020, ch. 39.02.)
Attorney General's Ministry	IP Office; Belize Intellectual Property Office (BELIPO) Vital Statistics Unit; The Vital Statistics Unit Legal Advice and Service Centre; Legal Advice and Service Centre	(Note: Finance Ministry 2025b, pp. 275–284, 398–402; "Home". Belmopan, Belize: AG's Min.)
Ministry of Transport	Transport Department; Department of Transport (DOT) Indigenous Peoples' Affairs Commission; Indigenous Peoples' Affairs Commission Constitutional and Political Reform Commission; Constitutional and Political Reform Commission	(Note: Finance Ministry 2025b, pp. 290–298, 398–402.)
Ministry of Labour	Labour Department; Department of Labour Local Government Department; Department of Local Government Rural Development Department; Department of Rural Transformation Labour Advisory Board; Labour Advisory Board	(Note: Finance Ministry 2025b, pp. 299–312, 398–402.)
Ministry of the Economy	Fisheries Department; Department of Fisheries	(Note: Finance Ministry 2025b, pp. 313–319, 398–402.)
Ministry of Defence	Coast Guard; Belize Coast Guard (BCG) Defence Force; Belize Defence Force (BDF) Joint Intelligence Operations; Joint Intelligence Operations Centre (JIOC)	(Note: Finance Ministry 2025b, pp. 320–327, 398–402.)

== Other miscellaneous entities ==
Parliamentary and judicial entities are separate from government. Public corporations, public-private partnerships and contractors are also separate from government. Similarly, local government entities (mostly councils) are separate from central government.

== See also ==
- Departments of the government of the United Kingdom – a larger Commonwealth realm
- Lists of government ministries by country
- Lists of government agencies by country

== Notes and references ==
=== References ===
1. Approved Budget Estimates (Report). Belmopan, Belize: Finance Min. 2000–2025.
2. Draft Estimates of Revenue and Expenditure for Fiscal Year 2025/2026 (Report). Belmopan, Belize: Finance Min. 12 May 2025.
3. Diplomatic and Consular List (Report). Belmopan, Belize: Foreign Min. October 2022.
4. Montalvo EN (ed.). "The Substantive Laws of Belize, Revised Edition 2020". Belmopan, Belize: AG's Min.
5. "The Cabinet". Belmopan, Belize: Press Office.
6. "The Office of the Prime Minister announces Cabinet appointments" (Press release). Belmopan, Belize: Press Office. 15 March 2025. PR 030-25.
7. "The Office of the Prime Minister announces new Chief Executive Officers" (Press release). Belmopan, Belize: Press Office. 19 March 2025. PR 033-25.
8. Annual Technical Reports of Ministries of Government for the 2023–2024 Fiscal Year (Report). Belmopan, Belize: Press Office. October 2024.
9. "How government works". London: GOV.UK.
10. "Public bodies". London: GOV.UK. 7 January 2025.
11. "Deadline extended: Call for expression of interest — BNCF audit". Belmopan, Belize: PACT. 28 February 2025.
12. "Acts of Parliament 2024". Belmopan, Belize: Natl Assembly.
