= Hugh Wooding Law School =

Law school in Trinidad and Tobago

- Parent school: Council of Legal Education
- Established: 1973
- Dean: Miriam Samaru (Principal)
- Location: Saint Augustine, Trinidad and Tobago; 10.651836°N 61.399841°W
- Website: hwls.edu.tt

The Hugh Wooding Law School (HWLS) is a law school in Trinidad and Tobago.

== History ==
Named for Trinidad and Tobago jurist and politician Hugh Wooding, HWLS is one of three law schools empowered by the (Caribbean) Council of Legal Education to award Legal Education Certificates, along with the Norman Manley Law School in Jamaica and the Eugene Dupuch Law School in the Bahamas. It opened its doors to students in September 1973. In its early years, it was marked by a scandal when eight out of its ten tutors and lecturers resigned in protest over a student from the Trindadian Police Service (TTPS) who failed his examinations but was not asked to discontinue his studies. In 1996, the Council of Legal Education made the controversial decision to require LLB graduates from the University of Guyana to take an entrance examination for admission to HWLS.

== Notable alumni ==
- Kenneth Benjamin, Chief Justice of Belize between 2011 and 2020.
- Ronnie Boodoosingh, Chief Justice of Trinidad and Tobago
- Adriel Brathwaite, Attorney-General of Barbados between 2010 and 2018
- Anthony Carmona, 5th President of Trinidad and Tobago, ex judge-elect of the International Criminal Court
- Hukumchand (class of 2000), former National Assembly of Guyana member
- Winston Murray (class of 2000), former Minister of Trade of Guyana
- Keith Sobion, graduate and former principal, first local graduate to become Attorney-General of Trinidad and Tobago
- Maureen Rajnauth-Lee, justice on the Caribbean Court of Justice
- Charlesworth Samuel, former Member of the Parliament of Antigua and Barbuda
- David Thompson, sixth Prime Minister of Barbados
- Cheryl-Lynn Vidal, Belize's Director of Public Prosecutions since 2008
- Elson Gaskin, Deputy Governor of the Central Bank of Barbados since 2016
- Kamla Persad-Bissessar, 7th and first female Prime Minister of Trinidad and Tobago
- Paula-Mae Weekes, 6th and first female President of Trinidad and Tobago
- Dia Forrester, first Female Attorney General of Grenada
- Sandra Mason, last Governor-General and first President of Barbados.
- Stuart Young, Prime Minister-designate of Trinidad and Tobago

== See also ==
- University of the West Indies
- Legal education
- Law degree
- List of law schools
- Caribbean Law Institute
