= NMLS =

NMLS may refer to:

- Nationwide Multi-State Licensing System and Registry, a record system for licensing and registration of financial services in the United States.
- Norman Manley Law School, a law school in Jamaica.
