= Maureen Rajnauth-Lee =

Maureen Rajnauth-Lee is a jurist from Trinidad and Tobago. She has sat on the Caribbean Court of Justice since 2015.

Rajnauth-Lee graduated from the University of the West Indies in 1976 with a Bachelor of Laws (First Class Honours), continuing her education at the Hugh Wooding Law School. From 1981 until 1985 she was a state counsel in the Office of the Solicitor General; from October 1985 until January 2001 she was a lawyer in private practice in Trinidad and Tobago. From February 2001 until October 2012 she was a Judge of the High Court; in the latter year she became a Justice of Appeal of the Judiciary of Trinidad and Tobago, in which position she remained until joining the bench of the Caribbean Court of Justice. Rajnauth-Lee has been active in the fight to combat sexual violence against women. She serves as vice-president of the Caribbean Association of Women Judges.
