= Oscar Ramjeet =

Guyanese journalist and lawyer

Oscar D. Ramjeet is a Guyanese journalist and lawyer. He has served in a variety of positions throughout the Caribbean, including as Belize's Solicitor-General from 2009 to 2011.

== Career ==
Ramjeet began his career as an attorney in private practice in his native Guyana in 1970. From 1986 to 1988, Ramjeet served in Montserrat as a magistrate as well as the Registrar of the High Court. Among other activities while there, he initiated a program to attempt to trace Canadians who purchased land at Spanish Point in the 1960s and 1970s. He took a trip to Toronto that year and was successful at finding thirty-two missing landowners. His career next took him to St. Vincent and the Grenadines, where he served as Solicitor General and acting Director of Public Prosecutions. He remained there until 1993; the following year, he moved to the United States Virgin Islands where he first served as Assistant Attorney General before becoming an administrative law judge on Saint Thomas Island in 1997. In 2000, he moved to the British Virgin Islands and returned to private practice. One high-profile case he took on while there was the defence of Michael Spicer when he was charged with the murder of American model Lois McMillen in Tortola.

Ramjeet was sworn in as Belize's Solicitor-General on 15 June 2009, filling the position that had been vacant for a year since the sudden departure of Tanya Herwanger after only five months on the job. Under his tenure, Belize began setting up the "Fast Track Court" in response to the increasing backlog of cases in the Magistrate's Court; the Belize Bar Association expressed concern over the heavy executive branch influence on the Fast Track Court, which they saw as threatening judicial independence. He also lobbied the Council of Legal Education to permit the admission of Belizean University of Guyana LL.B. students to Jamaica's Norman Manley Law School without the entrance exam; under a CARICOM-level agreement, the existing arrangement to facilitate UG graduates' entry to NMLS applied only to Guyanese nationals. He also oversaw the creation of the Office of International Legal Cooperation. He held the position of SG until his contract expired in 2011, and was succeeded by Cheryl Krusen.

== Personal life ==
Ramjeet holds an LL.B. from the University of the West Indies, a Caribbean Legal Education Certificate, and a diploma in journalism and public relations from West Germany. He also writes articles and columns for the Stabroek News and other Caribbean newspapers. One column he wrote in 2010, about the visit of President of Guyana Bharrat Jagdeo to the Afro-Guyanese village of Buxton, Guyana, led David Hinds to accuse him of racism.
