= Kirk Anderson =

Kirk Anderson may refer to:

- Kirk Anderson (judge) (born 1967), justice of the Supreme Court of Jamaica since 2011
- Kirk Anderson (cartoonist), winner of the 2005 James Aronson Award
- Kirk Anderson (As the World Turns), fictional character on American soap opera As the World Turns
- The victim in England's 1977 Mormon sex in chains case
