= Cheryl Krusen =

Caribbean lawyer

Cheryl Krusen (née Cheryl Thompson) is a Caribbean lawyer. A dual national of Jamaica and Belize, she has served in legal positions in various countries for three decades.

== Education ==
Krusen attended the University of the West Indies at Cave Hill, Saint Michael, Barbados, receiving her LL.B. in 1978, and went on to the Norman Manley Law School in Jamaica for her Legal Education Certificate. She also received an M.Sc. at UWI's Mona campus in 1996.

== Career ==
Krusen's earlier career took her through various positions both on the bench and before it, as crown counsel in the Office of the Director of Prosecutions of Belize, beginning in 1980 as a magistrate for Belize District and then Corozal District, deputy registrar of the Supreme Court of Jamaica; senior legal officer at the Port Authority of Jamaica, director of legal services at the National Housing Trust of Jamaica; legal adviser to the Deputy Prime Minister and Leader of Government Business in the House of Representatives of Jamaica, and legal advisor to Jamaica's Ministry of Foreign Affairs and Foreign Trade. From 2002 to 2008 she served with the Commonwealth Secretariat in London, before returning to the Caribbean to take up a position as CARICOM's general counsel.

In July 2011, Krusen was named Solicitor-General of Belize, replacing Oscar Ramjeet. She came to wider public attention later that year when she spoke out in support of the Belize Constitution (Ninth Amendment) Bill, which would put certain public utilities under public ownership, but more controversially would make constitutional amendments not subject to judicial review. As early as September 2011, the Belize Bar Association began to come into conflict with Attorney-General Bernard Q. Pitts over Krusen's positions; that month, in addition to the SG position, she was also named senior counsel. There was a question over her eligibility to hold the position of SG, as she did not fulfill the requirement of being enrolled for eight years as an attorney at law in Belize or elsewhere in the Commonwealth. Pitts got around this requirement by back-dating her enrollment to 1980 when she sat as a magistrate. In December 2011, the Belize Bar Association filed a formal court challenge to Krusen's eligibility.

Since 2013, Krusen has served as an adjunct professor at the University of Minnesota Law School.

== Personal life ==
Krusen was formerly married to Dylan Barrow. She is currently married to filmmaker Cristóbal Krusen; the two of them have six adult children. She holds Jamaican, Belizean, and United States nationality.

== Works ==
- Thompson-Barrow, Cheryl (2006). "A Corridor for Land-Locked States". Commonwealth Law Bulletin. 32 (1): 67–71. doi:10.1080/03050710600850231. OCLC 656656659. S2CID 144975561.
- Thompson-Barrow, Cheryl (2007). "Member States of the Commonwealth: Their Relationship with the International Court of Justice". Commonwealth Law Bulletin. 33 (3): 423–428. doi:10.1080/03050710701747302. OCLC 775007009. S2CID 153882639.
- Thompson-Barrow, Cheryl (2008). Bringing Justice Home: The Road to Final Appellate and Regional Court Establishment. Commonwealth Secretariat. OCLC 232976367.
