= Rodwell Williams =

Belizean lawyer

Rodwell Roosevelt Adlai Williams CBE (born 29 September 1956) is a Belizean lawyer. He is a name partner, along with Prime Minister of Belize and United Democratic Party leader Dean Barrow, in the Belize City law firm Barrow & Williams.

== Major cases ==
Williams began working for Michael Ashcroft, Baron Ashcroft as a mortgage law expert in 1989. In 2010, Williams successfully defended businessman Alfred Schakron against a lawsuit by politician Jose Coye alleging malicious prosecution; Coye was represented by Elson Kaseke. In 2011, Williams and Eamon Courtenay represented the Belize Association of Evangelical Churches and the Council of Churches in a joint effort with the Government of Belize to face off a constitutional challenge to Belize's sodomy laws by the United Belize Advocacy Movement, which was represented by Lisa Shoman. In 2012, he defended Elvin Penner against an election petition filed by losing candidate Orlando Habet, who was represented by ex-PM Said Musa.

== Murder attempt ==
On the evening of 31 May 2010, Williams was shot while walking from his office to his vehicle. Williams and the office security guard exited the building together at about 7:20 pm; the two were walking along Albert Street East when they were approached by two men on bicycles. Both assailants alighted from their bicycles, and one tackled the security guard while the other pointed a firearm at Williams. Williams was shot in the abdomen, and was rushed to Belize Healthcare Partners for surgery to extract the bullet. Williams had already lost four litres of blood by the time he arrived for surgery, and had suffered damage to his duodenum, inferior vena cava, and large intestine. He received enormous blood transfusions to keep him alive, and by the end of his third surgery had bled an additional six litres. Surgeons stated that most people would not live beyond three minutes after being shot in that manner, but Williams was able to cling to life and survive surgery.

Two men were charged with the attempted murder: Ricky Valencia and Akeem Thurton. While awaiting trial and out on bail, Valencia was again arrested on charges of handling stolen goods. Valencia and Thurton were the first suspects to be tried in the new "fast-track court" without the benefit of a jury. Director of Public Prosecutions Cheryl Taitt represented the Government of Belize. Valencia and Thurton came before the Chief Justice Kenneth Benjamin on the charges in early February 2012, but the case was adjourned because both defendants were still trying to get lawyers. While awaiting the resumption of the trial, Valencia was shot dead on 22 February while driving on Caesar Ridge Road. Police suspected his death was related to a dispute over the proceeds of a bank robbery in which he was allegedly involved.

Valencia's death left Thurton to stand trial alone for the attempt on Williams' life. It would be the first trial without jury in Belize. Thurton in the end was unable to obtain legal representation and appeared as a litigant in person. During the trial, he claimed that it was Valencia and not himself who had shot Williams; however, Williams refuted this. Justice Benjamin did not believe this either, and found Thurton guilty of the attempted murder. Thurton's sentence was announced on 30 March 2012: 15 years in prison. Benjamin stated that he had taken into account that Thurton had a family depending on his income as a fisherman, but also considered several aggravating factors such as his use of a firearm, and given the premeditation shown by lying in wait to ambush Williams the possibility that it was a murder for hire.

== Personal life and education ==
Williams was born in Belize City. He did his first degree in Economics at the Kingston, Jamaica campus of the University of the West Indies (UWI), and then a LL.B. at UWI Barbados. He went on to complete a Legal Education Certificate at the Norman Manley Law School in Jamaica, graduating in 1984. He is married to Felice Williams. In the New Year Honours 2009 Rodwell was appointed as a Commander of the Order of the British Empire.
