= Gian Ghandi =

Gian Chand Ghandi (also spelled Gandhi; 3 February 1933 – 17 August 2017) was a Belizean lawyer. He served as Belize's Solicitor-General for thirteen years before moving to the Ministry of Economic Development.

== Career ==
Gian Chand Ghandi was born in Punjab Province (British India) on 3 February 1933. He was the second of five children. His family originally lived in Lyallpur District, but migrated to the Indian side at the time of the Partition.

Ghandi moved from London to Belize in 1978 to work as a Crown Counsel. He was appointed to the position of SG under Manuel Esquivel's administration in the mid-1980s. He held this position through four administrations, as power transferred back and forth between Esquivel's United Democratic Party and the opposing People's United Party, leading Great Belize Television to dub him "the capital's ultimate survivor". He even remained in the SG position following Esquivel's second fall from power in the 1998 election. However, the political situation in the year after that became less kind to him. In February 1999, the Belize Bar Association requested that the government remove Ghandi from his position as SG, alleging ethics violations. Finally, long-time rival Godfrey Smith ascended to the position of Attorney-General just as Ghandi's contract was up for renewal, sealing his fate. At first Ghandi appeared to be getting kicked out of the government entirely; he stated that he would step down as SG and return to private practice.

However, just the next day, the government announced in a press release that Ghandi would instead take up a position as legal counsel to the Ministry of Economic Development as well as director-general of the new International Financial Services Commission. Ghandi held a variety of government positions after that, including in the Ministry of Immigration. Later he because legal counsel and director in the Ministry of Finance. In 2011, his office was the subject of a burglary. In 2012, he was involved with drafting legislation for the Dean Barrow administration to forgive 800 mortgages of BZ$50,000 or less held by the Belize Social Security Board, totalling BZ$7 million in value.

Ghandi died at the Western Regional Hospital in Belmopan on 17 August 2017.
