= George Brown (Belizean judge) =

Sir George Noel Brown (13 June 1942 – 26 July 2007) was the Chief Justice of the Supreme Court of Belize from 1991 to 1998, the second native-born Belizean to sit in that position.

== Career ==
Brown served the judiciary for more than four decades, rising up through the ranks. He began as a lay magistrate, and after qualifying as a crown counsel joined the Office of the Director of Public Prosecutions. He later became the Solicitor General of Belize. He served as acting Chief Justice in 1985–1986, and was named Chief Justice in 1991. His tenure was marked by conflict with the Judicial Committee of the Privy Council over the issue of capital punishment; of the twenty death sentences he handed down in his latter years, the Privy Council granted a stay of execution in all cases which were appealed. An article in a London newspaper poked fun at Brown's style of setting up loudspeakers in the courtroom and delivering "fire and brimstone" judgments which he claimed were divinely inspired; the article was banned from republication in Belize. Towards the end of his tenure as CJ, his health also began to deteriorate, and he suffered from epileptic seizures. He submitted his resignation in November 1997. In early 1998, he was succeeded by George Singh. After his retirement, he worked privately as a consultant with the law firm of Lionel Welch, and also served as an acting Justice of the Supreme Court from 7 April 1999 alongside Wilfred Elrington.

== Personal life ==
Brown was born to Noel "Todd" Brown and grew up in Gales Point. He was an aficionado of sailing. He attended St. Michael's College, Belize, where he joined the football, cricket, and track and field teams. He did his legal education at the Norman Manley Law School in Jamaica. He was knighted in December 1990. In May 1998, he co-founded the George Noel Brown Foundation along with Ella-Jean Gillett and Valentina Reyes to promote athletics and craftsmanship. However, his health continued to deteriorate after that, and in 2001 he went missing in Belize City due to disorientation. In February 2007, he was given the Belize Audubon Society's James A. Waight award for his contributions to the social, cultural, and environmental development of Belize, in particular for his charitable work in introducing at-risk youth to the arts of sailing and boat building. He died on 26 July that year. He was survived by his wife Lady Magdalene Elizabeth Brown, four daughters, and two sons. His funeral was held at Ephesus Adventist Church.

Legal offices
Preceded by George Moe	Chief Justice of the Belize Supreme Court (acting); 1985–1986	Succeeded by Taufik Cotran
Preceded by Taufik Cotran	Chief Justice of the Belize Supreme Court; 1990–1998	Succeeded by George Singh
