= Ronnie Boodoosingh =

Trinidad and Tobago jurist

The Honourable Ronnie Boodoosingh

9th Chief Justice of Trinidad and Tobago
- Incumbent
- Assumed office 22 October 2025
- President: Christine Kangaloo
- Prime Minister: Kamla Persad-Bissessar
- Preceded by: Ivor Archie

Personal details
- Born: Fyzabad, Trinidad and Tobago
- Spouse: Aberleen Boodoosingh
- Children: 1
- Education: Presentation College, San Fernando
- Alma mater: University of the West Indies (LLB); Hugh Wooding Law School (LEC); University of London (LLM)
- Occupation: Jurist; attorney

Ronnie Boodoosingh (born 1969/1970) is a Trinidadian jurist who is serving as ninth Chief Justice of Trinidad and Tobago since October 2025.

Boodoosingh graduated from the University of the West Indies and the Hugh Wooding Law School. He was admitted to the bar in 1992. He later obtained a Master of Laws in international dispute resolution from the University of London.

== Career ==
After being admitted to practice law in 1992, Boodoosingh worked for the law firm J. D. Sellier & Company. He worked for the office of the Director of Public Prosecutions (DPP) from August 1994 to August 2001. After leaving the office of the DPP he began lecturing at the Hugh Wooding Law School where he taught ethics and served as director of the Trial Advocacy Programme and founded the Human Rights Law Clinic. In 2007 he was appointed a puisne judge, and was appointed to the Court of Appeal in 2020.

=== Chief Justice ===
Boodoosingh is the ninth Chief Justice of Trinidad and Tobago since gaining its Independence.

== Personal life ==
Boodoosingh is married and has one daughter. He is an Indo-Trinidadian Hindu and was sworn-in as Chief Justice on the Bhagavad Gita.
