= San Ignacio Resort Hotel =

Hotel resort in Belize

Coordinates: 17.15381°N 89.068179°W

San Ignacio Resort Hotel is a hotel resort on Buena Vista Street, San Ignacio, Cayo District, Belize. It is located just off of the Western Highway, above the Macal River valley. It contains the Running W Steak House, The Stork Club and bar, and the Princess Casino. The hotel is popular with archaeologists working in the vicinity.

== History ==
The San Ignacio Hotel was opened in 1976 by its owner Escandar Bedran, a pioneer in Belizean tourism development. Bedran named the hotel after the town as he was born here. He retired in 1994 and his children are now looking after the affairs of the hotel. During the inauguration of the hotel, Bedran had announced that his hotel would provide the local residents of Belize with a place “to relax and have fun at a reasonable price."

In February 1994, on the occasion of her second visit to Belize, Queen Elizabeth and her husband Prince Philip were guests of honour at a luncheon hosted at the San Ignacio Resort Hotel. Wu Den-yih, Vice President of the Republic of China (Taiwan) also visited the hotel and attended a luncheon there during his August 2012 visit to Belize.

In 2007, Chayben Abou-Nehra, the fiancé of hotel founder Escandar Bedran's granddaughter Evita Bedran, was found dead of a gunshot wound in a room they shared at the hotel. Police believed it to be a suicide, though Abou-Nehra's family expressed suspicion. Investigation into the matter was complicated by the fact that Abou-Nehra had been in two separate altercations earlier in the evening.

== Architecture and facilities ==
Architecturally, the hotel is not of particular note; it is a placid concrete building, with terraces overlooking the Macal River. The flooring in the lobby is of marble and is set with an elegant staircase made of mahogany wood. Rooms consists of family suites which can accommodate 6 guests and single occupancy small-sized rooms.

=== Clubs ===
The hotel contains The Stork Club which often hosts live music on the weekends and karaoke on Thursday nights. It is named after the original club that Escandar created in the 1960s. The bar of the club serves a variety of tropical cocktails and local rums, wine and snacks. The club displays the work of local artists, which are sold to visitors. The hotel also contains the Princess Casino.

=== Restaurant ===
The hotel contains the Running W Steak House, with meat supplied by the largest producer of beef in Belize. The restaurant serves Mayan steak, marinated tenderloin with tortillas, chicken and fish dishes, and tropical fruit. Lebanese cuisine is also available. The dining room is furnished with varnished mahogany, and the patio contains wrought-iron tables and chairs and is often frequented by toucans in the trees nearby. It is popular with archaeologists working in the area at lunch times.

== Environment ==
The hotel contains a notable wildlife area with lizards and botanical gardens. The hotel holds workshops to encourage people to aid in preserving the heavily-hunted Green Iguana.
