= Manuel Sosa (judge) =

Sir Manuel Sosa CBE (born 1950) is a former president of the Belize Court of Appeal, a position he held from 3 January 2011 to 24 December 2020, the longest term of any holder of that office.

== Career ==
Sosa was called to the Belize Bar in 1976. He then served as an attorney in private practice until 1998, in the interim also taking a position on the Belize Advisory Council from 1987 to 1997 and temporarily serving as a Supreme Court of Belize justice in 1993. In 1998, he was named Chief Justice of the Supreme Court of Belize in a controversial appointment by outgoing United Democratic Party PM Manuel Esquivel which was made right before the Belizean general election, 1998. He succeeded George B. Singh, who with his failing health in mind was transferred to a less demanding position as a Justice of Appeal, only to pass away by March 1999.

After the UDP's election losses, incoming People's United Party PM Said Musa quickly took action to remove Sosa from his position as CJ by having a suit filed in the Supreme Court to nullify his appointment. In 1999, a judge of the Supreme Court (who was later removed from office for judicial misconduct) ruled, at a closed-door hearing of which Chief Justice Sosa was given no notice and at which he was therefore not present, that Esquivel had not fulfilled the constitutional requirement to consult with the leader of the opposition before appointing Sosa, meaning the appointment was null and void. In June that year, Sosa was sworn in as a Justice of Appeal instead. In 2011, Sosa succeeded Elliot Mottley as Court of Appeal President; Mottley had resigned from the position in protest of an amendment to the Constitution of Belize which reduced his life tenure to one year. Sosa is the first native of Belize to serve in the position of president. He is also the only person, living or dead, who has served as both Chief Justice of Belize and President of the Court of Appeal of Belize.

== Personal life ==
Sosa is a native of Corozal Town in northern Belize. Upon completion of junior college in British Honduras ("BH" – now Belize) in 1971, he was famously cheated out of the coveted BH Open Scholarship, which was awarded to a close relative of the country's Premier, and instead awarded the Second BH scholarship, at which point he embarked on his study of law. He graduated from the Norman Manley Law School in Jamaica in 1976. He received awards in respect of both years during which he attended that school, namely, Most Outstanding Student in the Law School for 1974-1975 and Most Outstanding Final Year Student in the Law School for 1975–1976. He is married to Elba Rosado-Sosa, officially known since 2014 as Lady Sosa, with whom he has three children. He was appointed Commander of the Most Excellent Order of the British Empire (CBE) in 1998. In September 2012, he was named a member of the Order of Belize. He was knighted in the 2014 Birthday Honours for services to the judiciary. In 2018, he was officially recognised by his alma mater, University of the West Indies (Cave Hill Campus), on the occasion of its 70th anniversary, as being among 70 of its graduates who have distinguished themselves by their "Outstanding Leadership and Public Service".

Legal offices
Preceded by George Singh	Chief Justice of the Belize Supreme Court; 1998–1999	Succeeded by Troadio Gonzalez (acting)
Preceded by Elliot Mottley	President of the Belize Court of Appeal; 2011-	Succeeded by
