= Michael Long (judge) =

Michael Long (21 October 1928 – 18 August 1985) was a British judge of the Sovereign Base Areas in Cyprus, having previously worked as a lawyer and judge in various African countries and as Director of Public Prosecutions in Belize.

== Life ==
Michael Long was born on 21 October 1928. He was the younger brother of Audrey Margaret Freeman (née Long, d.o.b. 20 August 1920, died 27 March 2011, aged 90).

After being educated in the Channel Islands and at Jesus College, Oxford, Long served in the Royal Air Force from 1950 to 1956 before being called to the bar by Middle Temple in 1956. He was then a member of the Army Legal Staff, in various locations including Cyprus, until 1960, when he became Crown Counsel and Resident Magistrate in Uganda. He moved to Kenya in 1965, initially as Principal of the Kenya School of Law before becoming Senior State Counsel and Deputy Registrar General. A move to Gambia followed in 1970, holding similar positions, then a posting as Crown Counsel in Sarawak before becoming a magistrate in Hong Kong in 1974. He left in April 1980 to become Director of Public Prosecutions in Belize. In the following year, he was appointed as Resident Judge of the Sovereign Base Areas of Cyprus. After a long illness, he died on 18 August 1985 at the age of 56.

Michael Long was the brother-in-law of Dr Paul Freeman, former Keeper of Entomology at the Natural History Museum.

Michael was married, and was the father of two children, Nigel Long and Carol Long.
