= George Singh =

7th Chief Justice of Belize

The Honourable George Singh

7th Chief Justice of Belize
- In office 2 February 1998 – 26 August 1998
- Nominated by: Manuel Esquivel
- Appointed by: Sir Colville Young
- Preceded by: Sir George N. Brown
- Succeeded by: Manuel Sosa

Personal details
- Born: George Bawa Singh; May 1937 Belize City, British Honduras (now Belize)
- Died: 9 March 1999 (aged 61) Belize
- Education: Norman Manley Law School

George Bawa Singh (May 1937 – 9 March 1999) was a Belizean judge who served as Chief Justice of the Supreme Court in 1998 and as a Puisne Justice of the Supreme Court from 1991 to 1998. He previously served as Solicitor General and Director of Public Prosecutions.

== Early life ==
Singh was born in May 1937. His father Bawa Singh Mann was a Sikh who had immigrated from India in the 1930s. Singh himself converted to Christianity. He graduated from Wesley College in 1954. That same year, he wrote three poems: "Dawn", "Dusk", and "Soliloquy of a Murderer". He received the gold medal for the last one in a national poetry competition.

== Career ==
After his graduation, Singh briefly worked as a primary school teacher before joining the public service in 1955. Starting as a clerk, he eventually became a customs inspector. Looking for a change in career, Singh entered the Norman Manley Law School in Jamaica, where he graduated in 1978. Singh held the posts of Solicitor General and Director of Public Prosecutions, and later played a significant role in the establishment of the Family Court, on which he also served as its first judge. In 1991 he was named a Justice of the Supreme Court. He was sworn in as Chief Justice on 2 February 1998, along with Supreme Court Puisne Justices Manuel Sosa and John Rivero. He took up the CJ position at a busy time, when there were plans to add two temporary justices from Australia to help with processing the sizeable number of civil cases before the court. However, due to Singh's failing health, PM Manuel Esquivel transferred him to a less-demanding position as a judge of the Court of Appeal on 26 August 1998, naming Manuel Sosa as the new CJ. The timing of this decision was criticised by the opposition during the 1998 election campaign.

== Family ==
Singh was married and had three sons, two daughters, and five grandchildren. Among his sons is former Minister of Police Douglas Singh and former CEO of Trade and Investments for Belize, Michael Singh.

=== Death ===
Singh died of a long-term illness on 9 March 1999.

Legal offices
Preceded by Sir George Brown	Chief Justice of the Belize Supreme Court; 1998	Succeeded by Manuel Sosa
