= Elson Kaseke =

Elson Kaseke (1967–2011) was a Zimbabwean lawyer. A long-time resident of Belize, he served that country in a variety of capacities including as a legal draftsman and as Solicitor-General before becoming an attorney in private practice there.

== Career ==
=== In the public service ===
Kaseke got his start in Belize as a legal draftsman; at the time of his law school graduation, Belize happened to be looking for a draftsman, and he decided to come to the country to try things out, apparently without the intention of remaining for long. According to former Attorney-General Godfrey Smith, Kaseke was responsible for drafting virtually all of Belize's laws from the mid-1990s up until about 2007. In that obscure field he became quite distinguished for his skill, even attracting the attention of the CARICOM secretariat, who consulted with him on the issue of harmonisation of laws. He further took up the position of Commissioner for Law Review, in which capacity he compiled nine volumes of The Laws of Belize, Revised Edition, published in 2000. He was also responsible for setting up the website BelizeLaw.org and making all of Belize's laws available online. In addition to all of the above, he also served as Belize's Chief Parliamentary Counsel.

Kaseke was named to the position of Solicitor-General in 2001, replacing Edwin Flowers who had been acting in the post since the transfer of Gian Ghandi. In 2005, he represented the government in its failed attempt to extradite Andrew and Floyd Brown to the United States on narcotics charges; Dean Barrow represented the defendants. His term was also marred by a scandal over his holdings in BELIPO (Belize Intellectual Property Office), a private company which had a revenue sharing agreement with the Belize Companies and Corporate Affairs Registry. In May 2006, AG Francis Fonseca announced that Kaseke's contract as SG would not be renewed. In media interviews, Fonseca stated that Kaseke "felt it was time for him to move on ... and we felt that it was an opportunity for us to have a new beginning. Over the next few months he continued to represent the government of Belize in existing cases, such as the unsuccessful application for a stay of execution of the Supreme Court ruling that restored Jeffrey Prosser to his seat on the board of Belize Telecommunications.

=== In private practice ===
After his departure from the position of SG, Kaseke went into private practice, forming his own law firm Kaseke and Company, and took on a wide variety of high-profile cases. Beginning in 2007, Kaseke represented Mark Seawell in a long-running extradition case, until he withdrew from Seawell's defense team in May 2011. In 2008, he represented Ara Macao Resort in a libel suit. After the case was dismissed, Kaseke stated that recent court decisions were "suspect" and raised "concern" about the judiciary; however, his attorneys Derek Courtenay and Simeon Sampson appeared before the court to apologise for these statements. In 2010, he represented politician Jose Coye in an unsuccessful malicious prosecution lawsuit against businessman Alfred Schakron.

In 2011, Kaseke defended American investor Allen Saum against charges of tampering with a legal document in a dispute with two local business partners, one of them Kimano Barrow (the nephew of PM Dean Barrow). Later that year he represented the Football Federation of Belize in its judicial review application against Minister of Sports John Saldivar, who was attempting to decertify it and ban it from using National Sports Council facilities under the Sports Act (Cap. 46). He appeared before the Caribbean Court of Justice in the first Belizean case it heard, unsuccessfully arguing that the government of Belize should not be permitted to bring an action for misfeasance against his clients Florencio Marin and Jose Coye regarding alleged wrongful sales of government land.

== Personal life ==
Kaseke held a LL.M. from the University of the West Indies at Cave Hill specialised in legislative drafting, and a LL.D. from the University of South Africa specialised in intellectual property law. In the latter months of 2011, Kaseke went to nearby Mérida, Yucatán, Mexico for medical treatment; he died there in December. He was survived by his 10-year-old daughter Jane. He was buried in Belmopan following a service in front of his office at Pineapple Street.

Kaseke achieved widespread professional regard in the Belizean legal field, but his abrasive personality led him into conflict with many around him, and his personal life was filled with tragedy and trouble. His wife Tsitsi and his son Solomon predeceased him, the latter due to a neurological disorder. In 2004, while serving as SG, Kaseke and a colleague flew to Washington, DC to represent Belize at an Organization of American States conference on the Inter-American Convention Against Corruption. En route, he had an alcohol-fueled argument with his seatmate and stood up to switch seats; as the plane was within half an hour of landing, this violated Transportation Security Administration, rules and provoked a further dispute with air crew. Kaseke was arrested on the ground and charged with misdemeanour obstruction of justice and interfering with the operation of an aircraft. In 2007, he was arrested in San Ignacio town, Cayo bar after a dispute with police, but no charges were filed. A colleague summed him up as "a force of nature".

== Works ==
- Kaseke, Elson (December 1998). "Legislative powers in the hands of the executive: the delegated legislative process in Belize". West Indian Law Journal. 23 (2): 6–12. OCLC 773519790.
- Kaseke, Elson (2001). "Parliamentary committees and participatory democracy in Belize". West Indian Law Journal. 26 (1–2): 115–126. OCLC 773402887.
- Kaseke, Elson (2006). Trademark dilution: a comparative analysis. University of South Africa. OCLC 74808501.
