= Norman Manley Law School =

Coordinates: 18.007116°N 76.746883°W

- Parent school: Council of Legal Education
- Established: 1973
- Dean: O. A. Carol Aina (Principal)
- Location: Mona, Jamaica
- Website: nmls.edu.jm

The Norman Manley Law School is a law school in Jamaica.

== Building and location ==
The Norman Manley Law School is located on the Mona campus of the University of the West Indies, yet it is a distinct and separate institution. Its building, designed by architect firm Rutkowski, Bradford & Partners, is noted as an example of Caribbean modernist architecture. It is a 700 square metres (7,500 sq ft), two-storey reinforced concrete block masonry building; construction was finished in 1975. It was badly damaged by Hurricane Gilbert in September 1988; a clerestory window broke and let the wind into the building, placing significant uplift pressure on the roof deck.

== History ==
Named for Jamaican statesman Norman Manley, NMLS is one of three law schools empowered by the (Caribbean) Council of Legal Education to award Legal Education Certificates, along with the Eugene Dupuch Law School in the Bahamas and the Hugh Wooding Law School in Trinidad and Tobago. It opened its doors to students in September 1973. In July 2008, former Deputy Solicitor General Stephen Vasciannie was appointed principal of NMLS, succeeding Keith Sobion who had died some months before. In November 2012, Carol Aina was appointed principal following Vasciannie's departure to take up the post of Jamaica's ambassador to the United States.

== Partnerships and outreach work ==
NMLS students are required to perform several hours of field work to graduate. One way they obtain these hours is by participating in legal clinics, through which the needy can obtain legal consultations at a price of J$1,000, far less than the usual tens of thousands of dollars required to meet with a private lawyer. In November 2008, NMLS signed a memorandum of understanding with the Inter-American Commission on Human Rights to form a partnership and hold seminars on human rights issues, including capital punishment.

== Notable students and faculty ==
- Dame Marcella Liburd, fifth Governor-General of Saint Kitts and Nevis
- Kirk Anderson, Justice of the Supreme Court of Jamaica
- Dean Barrow, fourth Prime Minister of Belize
- George Brown, Chief Justice of Belize from 1990 to 1998
- Zaila McCalla, Chief Justice of Jamaica
- Michel Chebat, former chairman of the Social Security Board of Belize and president of the Bar Association of Belize
- Troadio Gonzalez, justice of the Supreme Court of Belize
- Lindsay Grant, former Leader of the People's Action Movement of Saint Kitts and Nevis
- Burton P. C. Hall, Bahamian judge who sits on the International Criminal Tribunal for the Former Yugoslavia
- Cheryl Krusen, Solicitor-General of Belize
- Jody-Anne Maxwell, first non-U.S. winner of the Scripps National Spelling Bee
- Ann-Marie Smith, Chief Magistrate of Belize
- Lisa Shoman, Belizean lawyer and politician
- George Singh, Chief Justice of Belize in 1998
- Manuel Sosa, President of the Belize Court of Appeal, former Chief Justice
- Rodwell Williams (1984), Dean Barrow's partner at Barrow and Williams in Belize
- Dame Janice Pereira, Chief Justice of the Eastern Caribbean Supreme Court

== See also ==
- University of the West Indies
- Legal education
- Law degree
- List of law schools
- Caribbean Law Institute
