= Doug Singh =

Belizean politician

Douglas "Dough" Singh is a Belizean politician and a member of the United Democratic Party. He is the former Minister of Police and Public Security in Prime Minister Dean Barrow's cabinet from 2010 to 2012.

In 2012, Singh became National Security Minister. He was later appointed Chairman of the Belize Social Security Board and of the Belize Elections and Boundaries Commission, and became a director of Belize Telemedia Limited. He resigned from these positions in 2020.

== Personal life ==
Singh's father George Singh was a Justice of the Supreme Court of Belize, who served briefly as Chief Justice in 1998. He has two brothers and two sisters and is of Punjabi Sikh heritage.
