= Judiciary of Trinidad and Tobago =

The judiciary of Trinidad and Tobago is a branch of the Government of Trinidad and Tobago that interprets and applies the laws of Trinidad and Tobago, to ensure equal justice under law, and to provide a mechanism for dispute resolution.

The judiciary is a hierarchical system comprising a Supreme Court of Judicature, a Magistracy and a Family Court. The Chief Justice of the Supreme Court is the head of the judiciary and is appointed by the President, on the advice of the Prime Minister and the Leader of the Opposition; the current Chief Justice is Ronnie Boodoosingh. The Supreme Court consists of a High Court and a Court of Appeal, whilst the Magistracy consists of separate criminal and civil courts with original jurisdiction, and is led by a Chief Magistrate.

Final appeal on some matters is decided by the Judicial Committee of the Privy Council in London, but in recent years there have been attempts to transfer this function to the Caribbean Court of Justice (CCJ), which is based in Port of Spain, Trinidad. In April 2012, the then Prime Minister Kamla Persad-Bissessar announced that criminal appeals to the Privy Council would be abolished in favour of the CCJ, after a commitment made at the Caricom Heads of Government conference in Suriname in July 2011. However, the Opposition suggested that such a "halfway" move (i.e. criminal appeals but not civil appeals) might be against treaty obligations, although they supported any moves to the CCJ. Precedent for the partial abolition of appeals to the Privy Council was set by Canada ending criminal appeals to the court in 1933 and civil appeals in 1949.
