= Cheryl-Lynn Vidal =

Belize government prodecutor lawyer

Cheryl-Lynn Branker-Taitt Vidal is a Trinidadian lawyer, who serves as Belize's Director of Public Prosecutions.

== Early career ==
Vidal worked as a lawyer in private practice in Jamaica and her native Trinidad before coming to Belize in 2000. There, she joined the Office of the DPP and later the Attorney-General's Ministry as Crown Counsel, and also worked as a legal advisor for the Belize Police Department and as acting Registrar-General.

== As Director of Public Prosecutions ==
Vidal served as the Deputy DPP under Lutchman Sooknandan, and thus after the latter's departure naturally came under consideration for promotion. Vidal was said to have a good relationship with the police, unlike past DPPs whose terms had been marked by acrimony and a breakdown of communications. Some members of the 12-person Senate expressed concern over Vidal's past actions; Erden Salazar wanted a chance to question her over her decision to charge Orange Walk mayor Ravell Gonzalez with death by careless conduct rather than the standard and more serious negligent manslaughter for his role in a traffic accident two weeks prior. Douglas Singh stated that Solicitor-General Tanya Herwanger issued a letter suggesting that Vidal be hired on contract as acting DPP rather than given a full appointment to the position; in the end, the Senate voted to confirm Vidal as acting DPP.

Soon after her contract began, Vidal had to begin dealing with even more political cases, such as the decision to charge Said Musa with the theft of US$10 million of funds received from the Hugo Chavez administration in Venezuela. She also faced an increasing trend of witnesses refusing to testify in court cases due to fear, continuing the rising trend (seen before she took up her post) of declarations of nolle prosequi. One reform that Vidal suggested was to amend Belize's Evidence Act to be more similar to Jamaica's Evidence Act and allow witness statements to be introduced into evidence even when the witness is kept away from the court proceedings due to threats. Under Vidal's tenure as DPP, Belize also saw its first trial without jury, when two men were charged with the attempted murder of PM Dean Barrow's law partner Rodwell Williams. Vidal also won Belize's first conviction for human trafficking.

The DPP's office also suffered an unusually high number of resignations of lower-level staff under Vidal's tenure. In November 2008, a Canadian couple both working as Crown Counsels resigned from their positions and left the country after threats against them, leaving the DPP's office with just three Crown Counsels. Three more local lawyers also resigned over the next two years. Nevertheless, in June 2010 she was confirmed as substantive DPP when her original contract as acting DPP expired. A British expatriate lawyer who had been declared bankrupt in her home country was also hired to work in the DPP's office, but was assigned instead to the police, resigned a month later, and left the country. By the end of 2013, however, the office staff had grown to 10 crown counsel along with Vidal.

== Personal life ==
Vidal is a native of Trinidad and Tobago. She has children born in 2008 and 2010. She did her legal education at the Hugh Wooding Law School in Saint Augustine town there. She is married to Gang Suppression Unit commander Marco Vidal. She is registered as a Belizean voter in Belmopan. On 31 January 2014, she was elevated to the rank of Senior Counsel.
