= Taufik Cotran =

Taufik Suliman Cotran CBE (also spelled Taufig Cotran or Taufiq Cotran; 6 August 1926 – 8 March 2007) was a Commonwealth jurist.

Born in Haifa, Mandatory Palestine, he was studying in London when the State of Israel was established in 1948, and found himself unable to return home. He instead pursued his legal career in various Commonwealth countries. While living in London and working as a barrister, he naturalised as a Citizen of the United Kingdom and Colonies in 1951.

He went on to work as a police magistrate in Khartoum, Anglo-Egyptian Sudan, and headed the committee of enquiry into the August 1955 Sudan Defence Force mutiny at Torit, Juba, Yei, and Maridi at the beginning of the First Sudanese Civil War. He was named Chief Justice of Lesotho in 1976. He was named a Commander of the Most Excellent Order of the British Empire in the 1980 Birthday Honours. He became Chief Justice of Belize in 1986. He stepped down from that position in 1990, and was succeeded the following year by George Brown. He died at his home in Burnham Beeches, England in 2007.

Legal offices
Preceded by George Brown (acting)	Chief Justice of the Supreme Court of Belize; 1986–1990	Succeeded by George Brown
