= Lutchman Sooknandan =

Guyanese lawyer (born 1948)

Lutchman Sooknandan (born 21 March 1948) is a Guyanese-Belizean lawyer. He previously served as Belize's Director of Public Prosecutions, practices law privately at Sooknandan's Law Firm, and serves as Guyana's honorary consul in Belize.

== Career ==
Sooknandan came to Belize immediately after his law school graduation to work in the Office of the Director of Public Prosecutions, and remained in the country thereafter. He first became DPP in 1992, serving until 1994. He was appointed DPP again on 9 January 2007. One high-profile case which Sooknandan had to take on early in his was the prosecution of politically connected suspect Chayben Abou-Nehra for the murder of Shawn Copius in 2005, which was marred by police refusal to arrest him along with the disappearance of key evidence from his file before Sooknandan took office, and ended with a declaration of nolle prosequi; Sooknandan himself described the police's conduct as creating "the most shameful miscarriage of justice" he had ever seen. When questioned about his office's low conviction rate the following year, he laid the blame at the feet of the police's low investigative standards.

In total, Sooknandan lasted less than a year and a half in the position, and resigned amidst controversy. Attorney-General Wilfred Elrington stated that Sooknandan had communicated to him by way of Dickie Bradley (ex-PM Said Musa's Leader for Government Business) that he wanted to meet, stated that he wanted to resign, negotiated a severance package of BZ$175,000. Elrington suggested this was because Sooknandan was not able to handle the workload. Sooknandan, in contrast, stated that Elrington, had requested him to quit by the end of April, seven months before his contract would have ended in December. Sooknandan's deputy DPP Cheryl-Lynn Branker-Taitt was promoted into his place as acting DPP. Following his resignation, he returned to private practice. He was the second DPP in a row to depart suddenly from office, after Kirk Anderson, who though having tenure resigned and returned to his native Jamaica with a settlement package of BZ$100,000.

== Personal life ==
Sooknandan grew up in Anna Regina, Guyana. His brother, novelist Karan Chand, followed him to Belize in 1989 and worked as an administrator at St. Michael's College; he later moved to Ontario, Canada. Their father Sooknandan Ghasi, a native of Kolkata, West Bengal, India, came to Guyana in the early 20th century. Sooknandan did his legal education at the Hugh Wooding Law School in Trinidad and Tobago, graduating in 1986. Sooknandan is a naturalised citizen of Belize, though he states that when he first came in 1986 he did not originally intend to settle down in the country. He also holds permanent resident status in Canada.
