= Eugene Dupuch Law School =

Nassau, Bahamas law school, est. 1998

Coordinates: 25°04′06″N 77°19′41″W

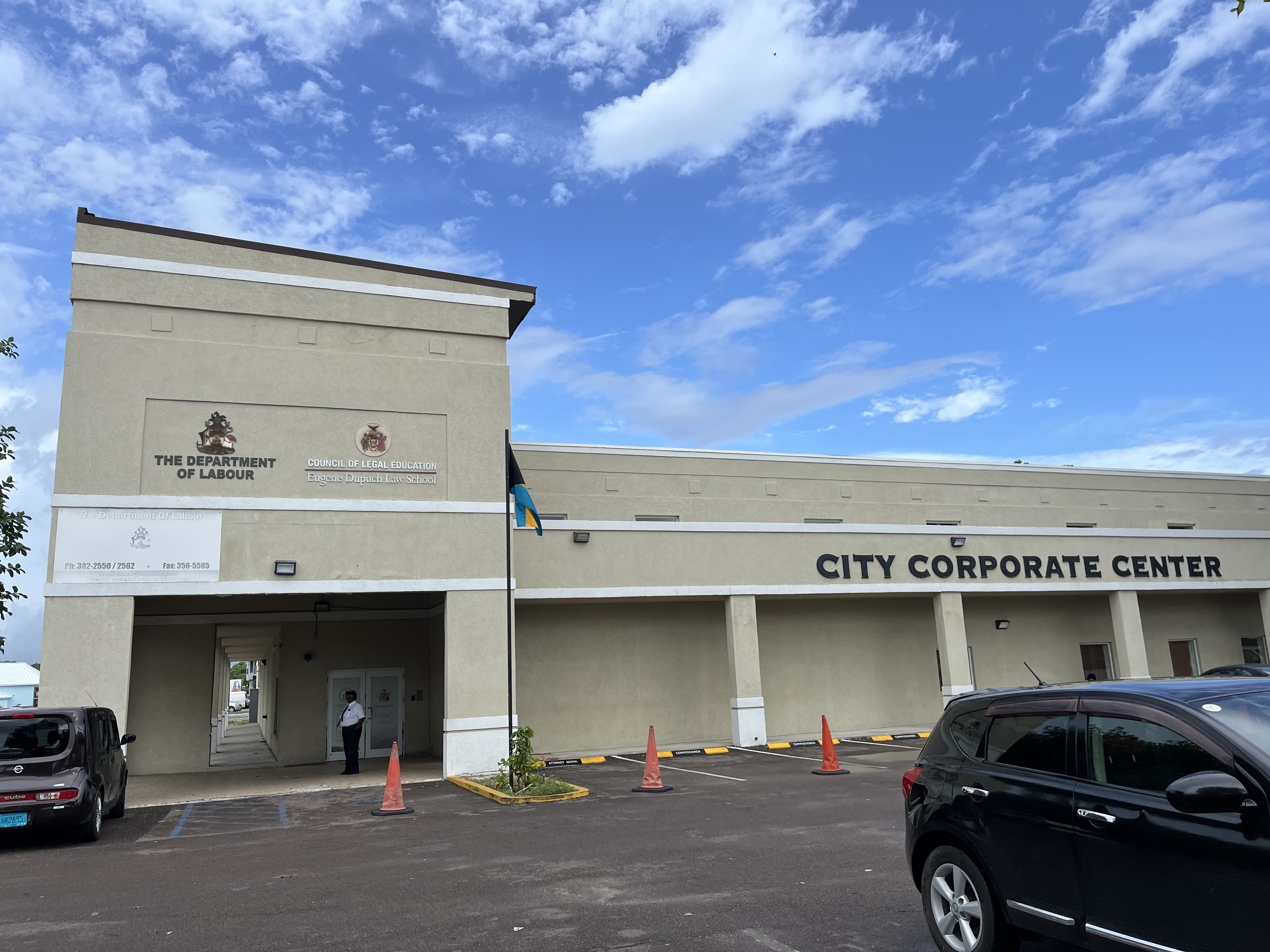
- Parent school: Council of Legal Education
- Established: 1998
- Dean: Tonya Bastian Galanis (Principal)
- Location: Nassau, The Bahamas
- Website: eugenedupuchlaw.edu.bs/

The Eugene Dupuch Law School is a law school in Nassau, Bahamas.

It was established in 1998 as the third law school in the English-speaking Caribbean and named for the lawyer, journalist and politician, the late Eugene Dupuch.

== Admission and academic program ==
The school, along with the Norman Manley Law School in Jamaica and the Hugh Wooding Law School in Trinidad and Tobago, offers a two-year practical professional training programme designed for persons who:

- have obtained a University of the West Indies LL.B degree; or
- hold a degree from a university or institution that is recognised by the Caribbean Council of Legal Education.

Upon successful completion of the programme, candidates are awarded a Legal Education Certificate entitling them to practise law in the Bahamas.

== See also ==
- University of the West Indies
- Legal education
- Law degree
- List of law schools
- Caribbean Law Institute
