= Troadio Gonzalez =

Troadio John Gonzalez (born 28 December 1941) is a justice of the Supreme Court of Belize.

== Career ==
Born in Belize, Gonzalez received his Bachelor of Law from the University of the West Indies Law Faculty in Barbados and Jamaica, and went on to the Norman Manley Law School in Jamaica. He served as Crown Counsel at the Office of the Director of Public Prosecutions from 1981 to 1988, Chief Magistrate from 1988 to 1991, and Director of Public Prosecutions from 1991 to 1993. He was appointed as a justice of the Supreme Court of Belize in 1993. He served as acting Chief Justice of Belize from 1999 until Abdulai Conteh of Sierra Leone was formally appointed to that position the following year. Gonzalez is believed to hold Belize's record for the longest delay in rendering a judgment in a case: DFC v Classic Woods Limited, which was heard in 1994 but on which he had not yet delivered a judgment by nearly fifteen years later in September 2009.

One case over which Gonzalez presided in 2006, the murder trial of Kirk Gordon, would go on to become the last Belizean criminal case to be heard on appeal by the Judicial Committee of the Privy Council; on 1 June 2010, Belize replaced the Privy Council with the Caribbean Court of Justice as its court of last resort. The Privy Council reduced Gordon's murder conviction to one of manslaughter, ruling that Gonzalez' jury instructions regarding the defense of partial loss of control had wrongly directed them consider to whether a reasonable person would have felt terror and immediate threat of death, rather than to consider Gordon's actual state of mind.

== Retirement age ==
Though he reached the ordinary retirement age of 65 in December 2006, Gonzalez continued to sit on the bench and hear cases. The Constitution of Belize allows a judge to continue serving until age 75 if he has been formally reappointed, but Gonzalez had never undertaken this step. This brought into question verdicts he had handed down in 38 criminal cases. After the news about Gonzalez' status came to light in February 2008, he took indefinite leave from his position. The government passed legislation to strip the Senate of Belize of its power to confirm Gonzalez' reappointment, but it was challenged in court. Attorney General Wilfred Elrington in August granted Gonzalez a one-year contract to continue to serve as a Supreme Court justice. In June, Elvis Myers, a man to whom Gonzalez had meted out a life sentence for murder, launched a challenge against Gonzalez' eligibility to have presided over his trial. Coincidentally, his attorney was Elrington's brother Hubert Elrington.

Legal offices
Preceded by Manuel Sosa	Chief Justice of Belize (acting); 2000-2001	Succeeded by Abdulai Conteh
