= Michel Dupuch =

French diplomat (1931–2024)

Ambassador of France to Ivory Coast
- In office 1979–1993
- Preceded by: Jacques Raphaël-Leygues
- Succeeded by: Christian Dutheil de La Rochère

Personal details
- Born: 1 September 1931
- Died: 19 June 2024 (aged 92)
- Education: École nationale de la France d'outre-mer
- Occupation: Diplomat

Michel Dupuch (1 September 1931 – 19 June 2024) was a French diplomat and government official. He served as Ambassador of France to Ivory Coast and later an advisor on African affairs under President Jacques Chirac from 1995 to 2002.

== Biography ==
Born on 1 September 1931, Dupuch studied at the École nationale de la France d'outre-mer and began his career in Grenoble, organizing the 1968 Summer Olympics. He then became a government official in the Charles de Gaulle administration in the Élysée Palace. After de Gaulle's departure, he led the cabinets of several government ministers such as Prime Minister Pierre Messmer and Minister of Defence Yvon Bourges. He was later a special advisor to Prime Minister Raymond Barre.

Dupuch was appointed Ambassador of France to Ivory Coast in 1979, when at age 47 he was the youngest ambassador in France. He remained in Abidjan and Yamoussoukro until 1993, when President Félix Houphouët-Boigny died in 1993. He advised Chirac on African affairs from 1995 to 2002 and retired at age 72 despite the President's pleas for him to remain.

Dupuch died on 19 June 2024, at the age of 92.

== Distinctions ==
- Commander of the Legion of Honour (2002)
