= Central Information Technology Office =

The Central Information Technology Office (or CITO ) is an office under the Ministry of Finance in the country of Belize, located in the capital city of Belmopan. The office manages the government’s primary accounting system (SmartStream), as well as the application for the Income Tax and Sales Tax departments (SIGTAS). The office is also responsible for the implementation of the eGovernment policy. Other CITO responsibilities include, server hosting, for a number of government offices, management of the government's gov.bz email servers, and also the phone and fax services for the government offices in Belmopan.

The office was established in the early 1980s, and was originally called the Belmopan Computer Centre, or BCC. Back then the office's main purpose was to produce electronic financial reports and trade statistics for the government. The source of the data were from paper copies of financial forms, and customs entry transactions that were already processed. These copies would then be sent to BCC for data entry. To enable the office to effectively perform its work, an IBM System/34 mini computer was installed; this computer allowed the data to be entered and verified, and final reports to be produced, which would then be utilized by the various governmental ministries.

== History ==
In the mid to late 1990s, microcomputers were becoming increasingly more popular. Most, if not all, of the government service were using these devices to perform an array of government related work. There were also a few offices that had established networks which allowed the sharing of information and equipment. During this time period, BCC was still utilizing the IBM System/34; the system however, had already reached the end of its support life cycle, and it was becoming more difficult to keep the functioning. In 1999 the government decided that an upgrade to their electronic financial processes was required. As a result, through funding from the European Union (EU), a two (2) year project was approved that would evaluate the entire government’s financial system, and determine suitable systems that could replace it. The project was known as the Financial Management Development Project (FMDP).

As a result of the recommendations that came out of the project, it was decided that all government offices that had an accounting and tax office, would be connected (networked) to each other. The accounting and tax offices would then utilize the SmartStream System, for accounts, and the SIGTAS System, for Income Tax and Sales Tax. It was determined that BCC would be the main hub, and the necessary staff, equipment, supporting software and services, would be provided to allow financial services to be managed. The physical office where BCC was located, was renovated to accommodate the new staff and equipment. The IBM System/34 was removed from the premises and given to the museum office. In the year 2000, live testing of the system commenced, and by 2005, the system was being utilized in most financial offices of the government. Aside from the financial services, BCC also offered centralized file storage, resource equipment sharing, such as printers, as well as an internal email system. These services were restricted, however, to those offices that were connected to the system; usually the accounts and the tax offices.

After seeing the benefits of the country wide network, BCC began to get more requests for the use of its infrastructure for services not just related to accounting and taxes. Gradually these requests were honored, and BCC began to extend its services to more than just the management and administration of the financial applications. Based on the evolving roles, the name was changed from the Belmopan Computer Centre (BCC), to the Central Information Technology Office (CITO). CITO was now the primary office for computing services for the government. In 2015, the office received an ISO/IEC 27001:2013 certification, since it brought into accordance its procedures, policies and documentation.
