= Development Finance Corporation Belize =

Bank of Belize

Development Finance Corporation
- Industry: Financial services
- Founded: September 27, 1963; 62 years ago
- Headquarters: Belmopan, Belize
- Area served: Belize
- Key people: Henry Anderson (Chairman), Raineldo Guerrero (Deputy Chair)
- Products: Financing for: Home, Tourism, Renewable Energy, Business, Agriculture and Education
- Website: www.dfcbelize.org

Development Finance Corporation (DFC) is the only development bank in Belize, Central America. Established on September 27, 1963, the bank provides micro sector enterprise (small business) loans, home loans, student Loans, productive sector loans (agriculture, manufacturing, fisheries, etc.) and from 2016, renewable energy and energy efficiency loans for businesses.

Between 2009 and 2016, the DFC has invested over $160 million in the people and economy of Belize. DFC is not a cash-deposit Bank. The Corporation accesses financing from larger regional and international lending institutions at attractive rates for lending to Belizeans Citizens, Residents, companies, cooperatives and other bodies with Belizean majority share Interest.

Its purpose is to support the strengthening and expansion of Belize's economy by providing developmental financing on an economically sustainable and environmentally acceptable basis to individuals, businesses and organizations.

== History ==
The Development Finance corporation was established in Belize, Central America on September 27, 1963, under the DFC Ordinance No.2 of 1961 as amended by No. 15 of 1963. It was owned by the private sector. In 1973 DFC was restructured and became a financial institution owned by the Government of Belize. This entity fell under the responsibility of the Ministry of Finance and Defense. The DFC operates under the New DFC Act No. 1 of 2009 of the Laws of Belize.

On September 27, 2013, the Corporation celebrated 50 years of service to Belize, also unveiling its new logo. Always innovating, DFC introduces Renewable Energy and Energy Efficiency Financing for businesses.

== Branches ==
- Headquarters - Belmopan, Belize
- Corozal Town
- Orange Walk Town
- Belize City
- San Pedro
- Dangriga
- Punta Gorga

== Economic impact ==
Between 2009 and 2016, the DFC has invested $163 million Belize dollars in the people and economy of Belize. Productive sector lending represent 69.5 per cent of DFC's total loan portfolio. As of August 2016, the DFC hold 6,439 loan accounts.
