= Karl Heusner Memorial Hospital =

Geography
- Location: Belize City, Belize
- Coordinates: 17.507192°N 88.195646°W

Organisation
- Type: General

History
- Former name: Old Belize City Hospital
- Opened: 1820 Old Belize City Hospital; 18 September 1995, Karl Heusner Memorial Hospital

Links
- Website: www.khmh.bz
- Lists: Hospitals in Belize

Karl Heusner Memorial Hospital (formerly the Old Belize City Hospital) is the main public hospital in Belize City, Belize. It functions as both the national referral hospital, and the district hospital for Belize District. It is located on Princess Margaret Drive, next to the offices of the Belize Social Security Board. It is publicly owned and operated, and is the main hospital in the area.

Within the city there are seven other public hospitals, including three regional hospitals.

== History ==
The original Old Belize City Hospital was established in 1820. Antoni Gościński worked as a surgeon at the hospital from 1949. The new Belize City Hospital opened its doors on 18 September 1995 and was renamed after Dr. Karl Heusner as a tribute to his lengthy career in medicine and his dedication to the people of Belize, serving the people for 63 years from his clinic. Its total construction costs were roughly BZ$45 million. Facilities on its grounds include the Bliss School of Nursing, the Central Medical Lab, and the Government Eye Clinic.

A scandal arose surrounding KHMH in 2009 when questionable procurement practises regarding pharmaceuticals and other medical supplies came to light, and the government set up a commission of inquiry to investigate. Chairman Ricardo Fabro resigned in the aftermath. In May 2011, Corozal Town businessman Gulab Sharma was named the new chairman. In June 2011, construction work began on its children's intensive care unit. In October 2011, a medical mission from the United States arrived at the hospital to provide specialized treatment, such as cardiac catheterization and podiatry consultations.

== Facilities ==
As the hospital notes: "The KHMH has a capacity of 134 beds, and boast three surgical suits as well as two labor and delivery suits. A 24/7 stat lab, weekend pharmacy services, and range of over 25 specialists make the KHMH the place where, increasingly, more and more Belizeans turn to for emergency and medical care. Specialist clinics are held weekdays; additionally, private services are offered, allowing KHMH patients more options even within the parameter of being a public institution."
