= Kirk Anderson (judge) =

Caribbean jurist

Kirk Brian Anderson (born 20 April 1967) is a Caribbean jurist. A dual national of Jamaica and Belize, he has experience both before the bench and behind it, in Belize as Director of Public Prosecutions and in Jamaica as a justice of the Supreme Court, and in both countries as a lawyer in private practice.

== Career ==
Anderson came to Belize in the early 1990s, where he started out as a Crown Counsel. He later spent some years in private practice at the law firm of Barrow and Williams. As a high-profile criminal attorney, Anderson often butted heads with the police, but nevertheless he was named Belize's Director of Public Prosecutions in March 2002, succeeding Rory Field. However, as his term went on, he began to clash increasingly with the United Democratic Party. In September 2004, he wrote to Financial Intelligence Unit Director Keith Arnold to recommend that money laundering charges be filed against UDP head Dean Barrow, his old boss at Barrow and Williams. In October 2006, angered by the police's handling of a murder case against Chayben Abou-Nehra, and with the Leader of the Opposition and the Bar Association of Belize aligned against him, Anderson agreed to resign. He departed from Belize at the end of that year. He had forgotten to pay his final tax bill of BZ$28,000, and so he was detained at the airport and missed his initially scheduled flight.

In Jamaica, Anderson was named a partner at Dunn & Cox Attorneys-at-Law in Kingston, Jamaica in 2007, specialising in civil and commercial litigation and sports and entertainment law. He also became a first-year associate course tutor at his alma mater, the Norman Manley Law School. In August 2011, he was named a judge of the Supreme Court of Jamaica, fulfilling one of his lifelong dreams.

== Personal life ==
Anderson was born in Kingston, Jamaica. He did his LL.B. at the University of the West Indies and his Legal Education Certificate at Norman Manley Law School. He was called to the bar of Belize in 1993 and of Jamaica in 2007.

== Works ==
- Anderson, Kirk (September 2000). "The flogging of prisoners in Belize: is this practice constitutionally valid?". Commonwealth Caribbean Human Rights Seminar (PDF). Foreign and Commonwealth Office.
