= Eugene Dupuch =

Bahamian journalist, lawyer and politician

Hon. Eugene Aubrey Pyfrom Dupuch CBE QC (7 December 1912 - 23 September 1981) was a Bahamian journalist, lawyer, Member of Parliament, and Cabinet Minister.

== Early life and education ==
Dupuch was the son of Leon Dupuch, founder of the Tribune newspaper, and his second wife, Mary Ethelinda Pyfrom. Eugene had four older half-siblings from his father's first marriage, including Sir Etienne Dupuch.

Eugene attended Queens College and graduated from Saint John's University (Minnesota) in BA in 1934.

== Career ==
=== Journalism ===
He became an assistant editor at the Tribune and married Gladys Black, a staff reporter at paper. Gladys Black, unfortunately died nine months after their marriage.

In 1943, he famously covered the Sir Harry Oakes murder trial, his report later being turned into a book.

=== Legal career ===
In 1944, ten years after obtaining his bachelor's, Dupuch enrolled in law school at University of Toronto, Ontario. In 1948, he was called to the English Bar at Lincoln's Inn. He became a member of the Bahamas Bar in January 1949.

Dupuch and future Governor-General of the Bahamas Orville Turnquest were for many years partners in the law firm, Dupuch and Turnquest.

In 1964, Dupuch was appointed one of Her Majesty's Counsel (QC) and acted as a judge of the Supreme Court of the Bahamas in 1976. He also served as president of the Bar Association and chairman of the Bar Council.

=== Political career ===
Dupuch served for more than 15 years in the House of Assembly and on the Executive Council from 1952 to 1964.

He was at various times, Acting Attorney-General, Minister of Welfare, one of the delegates to the first constitutional conference in 1963, Acting Premier, Minister without Portfolio, and Opposition Leader in the Senate of the Bahamas.

== Honours and awards ==
In 1957, Dupuch was made Commander of the Order of the British Empire in the Queen's Birthday Honours.

In 1964, Dupuch was appointed Queen's Counsel.

== Death and legacy ==
On 23 September 1981, Dupuch died of a heart attack. He was 68. He was survived by his second wife, Dorothea, and son Peter.

In September 1998, the Eugene Dupuch Law School was named for him.

== Works ==
- "Smoky Joe says: a volume in Bahamian dialect" by Eugene Dupuch with Illustrations by L. Gilbert Dupuch. The Tribune. Nassau, Bahamas. 1936. 130 p.
