= Caribbean Law Institute =

Legal organization

- Formation: 1988
- Type: Legal
- Headquarters: Tallahassee, Florida
- Location: United States
- Director: Elwin Griffith
- Website: www.caricom.org/institutions/caribbean-law-institute-cli-caribbean-law-institute-centre-clic/

The Caribbean Law Institute (CLI) was established in 1988 under a grant from the United States Agency for International Development to promote such activities that would further clarify the laws affecting trade, commerce and investment in the Region, while at the same time respecting the unique needs of local jurisdictions.

This joint project between Florida State University (FSU) and the University of the West Indies (UWI) has its offices in Tallahassee and at the Caribbean Law Institute Centre (CLIC) in Barbados, which was created in 1994 as a unit of research in the Faculty of Law at UWI. The Centre works in parallel with the CLI office at FSU.

Early in its history, CLI identified certain law reform priorities. One of CLI's first tasks was to develop and administer the Commercial Law Survey, which defined the state of commercial law in the Region and provided background information to guide the selection of other projects. CLI's projects have included Company Law, Shipping Law, Treaties, Environmental Law Survey, Insurance Law, Consumer Law, Banking Law, Bankruptcy, Insolvency, and Alternative Dispute Resolution.

CLI meets its objectives by organizing experts in the legal and business communities to provide objective research and analysis of law-related constraints to economic development. CLI drafts legislation and regulations affecting the modernization and harmonization of laws in the Caribbean, especially in the area of commercial law, and informs and educates the business community, the Bar, government leaders and consumers about CLI's law reform programs.

CLI cooperates in its activities with CARICOM, OECS, regional governments and a number of professional associations in law, accounting, industry and commerce. To meet its goals, the Institute engages in projects that command the interest of those who have a stake in the modernization and harmonization of laws. As CLI seeks ways to involve the legal, governmental and commercial sectors in its activities, these constituencies become effective advocates for the draft legislation CLI produces.

CLI has also organized meetings of the CLI Fellows to discuss CLI drafts. The Fellows include the attorneys general of the Caribbean nations served by CLI, and members of the private Bar and of the commercial sector.
