= Solicitor-General of Belize =

The Solicitor-General of Belize is a law officer of the government of Belize, subordinate to the Attorney-General of Belize. The office is defined briefly by the Constitution of Belize, which mentions it as one of the ex officio members of the Public Services Commission. In 1999, after Gian Ghandi was removed from the SG position, the role's responsibilities were revised; in particular, court administrative and financial functions were transferred to the Permanent Secretary of the Attorney-General's Ministry, while law drafting became the responsibility of the Office of Parliamentary Counsel, then Elson Kaseke. From 2008 to 2009 the office of Solicitor-General was vacant, leading to criticism of PM Dean Barrow.

== List of Solicitors-General of Belize ==
- George Brown
- George Singh
- Gian Ghandi, 1987 to 1999
- Edwin Flowers (acting), 1999 to 2001
- Elson Kaseke of Zimbabwe, 2001 to 2006
- Edwin Flowers, 2006 to 2008
- Tanya Herwanger, 2008; resigned over the Chester Williams case
- Oscar Ramjeet, 2009 to 2011
- Cheryl Krusen, 2011 to 2013
- Nigel Hawke, 2013 to 2015 (acting)
- Anika Jackson, 2015 to 2016
- Nigel Hawke, 2016
- Elisa Montalvo- Present
