= Social Security Board (Belize) =

Belize government agency

The Social Security Board (SSB) is a statutory corporation of Belize which administers the country's Social Security Fund. It was established in 1981 by Part IV of the Social Security Act (SSA).

The Social Security Board is part of the membership of the Inter-American Conference on Social Security it is a technical and specialized international organization, which has the objective of promoting the development of social protection and security in America.

== History ==
The SSB was established on 1 June 1981 with a staff of 26 and funding consisting of a government loan of BZ$50,000. By 2006, it had grown to 263 employees. In those 25 years it paid out a total of BZ$33 million in benefits, and collected BZ$49 million in contributions.

== Structure ==
=== Overview ===
The SSB's chief executive is referred to as the Manager. The Manager is appointed by the Minister of Finance under Section 35 of the SSA. The Manager is responsible for the collection of contributions, the payment of benefits, and the accounting of all moneys collected, paid, or invested under the SSA. The Assistant Manager is appointed by the SSB itself. Other statutorily-specified positions include the senior inspector (Section 38). The government also appoints the chairman or chairperson of the SSB. The SSB board in total consists of nine members: five members representing the government (including the chairperson), two members representing employees both from the National Trade Union Congress of Belize, and two members representing employers (one from the Belize Chamber of Commerce and Industry and one from the Belize Business Bureau). The chairman serves for a term of five years, and other members for three years.

=== List of high-level members ===
Persons who have held the position of chairperson of the SSB include:

- Michel Chebat, appointed September 2006
- Lois Young (the ex-wife of PM Dean Barrow), appointed February 2008

Persons who have held the position of chief executive officer of the SSB include:

- Narda Garcia, fired 21 July 2006
- Louis Zabaneh, appointed 31 August 2007
- Merlene Bailey-Martinez, resigned 21 February 2012 in the midst of an insider trading scandal

== Powers of inspectors ==
Inspectors are empowered by Section 40 to enter any premises (excluding private dwellings not used for trade or business) and to make any inquiries for the purpose of determining whether the employment of persons therein complies with the SSA. Under Section 41, such inspectors are immune from claims relating to the discharge of their duties, unless it is proven that an act or omission was malicious and without probable cause.
