= Legal Education Certificate =

In the Commonwealth Caribbean, a Legal Education Certificate is a professional certification awarded to a person who has completed a course of study and training at a law school established by the Council of Legal Education. It was created by Articles 4 and 5 of the 1970 Agreement Establishing the Council of Legal Education.

== Awarding institutions ==
There are three law schools that are empowered to award LECs: the Norman Manley Law School in Jamaica, the Hugh Wooding Law School in Trinidad and Tobago, and the Eugene Dupuch Law School in The Bahamas. In general, LL.B. Graduates of the University of the West Indies are entitled to automatic admission to the above law schools, whereas others must take an entrance examination. Another agreement allows University of Guyana graduates to bypass the entrance exam as well. This exemption only applies to Guyanese nationals. In 2010, Solicitor-General of Belize Oscar Ramjeet lobbied for the exemption to be extended to Belizeans.

An LEC allows its holder to be admitted to practise law in any country or territory which is a signature to the agreement. In general, no person who does not hold an LEC may be so admitted. The original agreement exempted persons who were qualified to practise law on or before 1 October 1971, or who were undergoing a course of study leading to a qualification which would have enabled them to practise law before that date and who completed that course before 1 January 1980. A supplementary agreement in September 1984 extended the transitional period, and also provided for separate principals for each of the law schools empowered to award LECs.

== Signatory countries, territories, and organisations ==
Signatories
1970 agreement	1984 supplement			
Country, territory, or organisation	Country or organisation	Representative	Date	Location
Antigua	Antigua and Barbuda	Keith Ford	19 September 1984	St. John's, Antigua and Barbuda
Bahamas	The Bahamas	P. L. Adderley	23 September 1984	Miami, Florida, United States
Barbados	Barbados	Louis Tull	14 September 1984	Ocho Rios, Jamaica
British Honduras	Belize	George Brown	19 September 1992	Kingston, Jamaica
British Virgin Islands	British Virgin Islands	Non-signatory		
Cayman Islands	Cayman Islands	Non-signatory		
Dominica	Dominica	Ronan David	14 September 1984	Ocho Rios, Jamaica
Grenada	Grenada	Dennis R. M. Lambert	15 September 1984	Ocho Rios, Jamaica
Guyana	Guyana	Mohamed Shahabuddeen	15 September 1984	Georgetown, Guyana
Jamaica	Jamaica	Winston Spaulding	14 September 1984	Ocho Rios, Jamaica
Montserrat	Montserrat	Non-signatory		
Saint Christopher-Nevis-Anguilla	Saint Kitts and Nevis	Samuel Weymouth Tapley Seaton	20 September 1984	Basseterre, Saint Kitts
Saint Christopher-Nevis-Anguilla	Anguilla	Non-signatory		
Saint Lucia	Saint Lucia	Non-signatory		
Saint Vincent	Saint Vincent and the Grenadines	Non-signatory		
Trinidad and Tobago	Trinidad and Tobago	Russel Martineau	14 September 1984	Ocho Rios, Jamaica
University of Guyana	University of Guyana	George Walcott	10 October 1984	Georgetown, Guyana
University of the West Indies	University of the West Indies	Aston Preston	14 September 1984	Ocho Rios, Jamaica

Belize did not join the 1984 supplement initially, but eventually signed it later. It was a signatory to the 1970 agreement as "British Honduras".
