= Director of Public Prosecutions (Belize) =

Senior legal office in Belize

The Director of Public Prosecutions is the head prosecutor of Belize, whose role is to prosecute criminal offences.

== Legal basis ==
The office of DPP is established in Article 108 of the Constitution of Belize; candidates for the position must have the same qualifications as Justices of the Supreme Court. The DPP is appointed by the Governor-General on the advice of the Judicial and Legal Services Section of the Public Services Commission, with the concurrence of the Prime Minister after consultation with the Leader of the Opposition. Though the DPP is formally part of the PSC, under Article 106(6) the PSC does not have the power to remove the DPP. Instead, under 108(6) through (8), the PM must refer the question of removal to the Governor-General, who requests the Belize Advisory Council to investigate whether the DPP is unable to discharge his duties of office or whether his misbehaviour rises to the level of requiring his removal from office.

== List of Directors of Public Prosecutions ==
- Albert Staine, 1969
- Michael Long, 1980 to 1981
- George Singh
- Troadio Gonzalez, 1991 to 1992
- Lutchman Sooknandan (first), 1992 to 1994
- Rory Field, 2000 to 2002
- Kirk Anderson, 2002 to 2006
- Lutchman Sooknandan (second), 2007 to 2008
- Cheryl-Lynn Vidal; 2008 to 2010 (acting), 2010 to present
