= Government of Belize =

National government

His Majesty's Government in Belize
- Constitutional monarchy and Parliamentary democracy
- Coat of arms of Belize
- Formation: 21 September 1981; 44 years ago
- Founding document: Constitution of Belize
- Country: Belize
- Website: www.belize.gov.bz

The Crown
- Head of State (sovereign): King of Belize
- Vice-regal representative: Governor-General of Belize
- Seat: Belize House

Legislative branch
- Legislature: National Assembly: House of Representatives; Senate
- Meeting place: National Assembly Building

Executive branch
- Head of Government: Prime Minister of Belize
- Appointed by: Governor-General of Belize
- Headquarters: Sir Edney Cain Building
- Main organ: Cabinet of Belize
- Departments: 18 Ministries / Departments

Judicial branch
- Court: Supreme Court of Belize
- Seat: Belize City

His Majesty's Government in Belize, also referred to as the Belizean Government is the democratic administrative authority of Belize, a constitutional monarchy under a parliamentary democracy. It was formed in 1981 after gaining sovereignty from the United Kingdom. The constitution is the supreme law of Belize.

== Executive branch ==
Main office-holders

The head of state and king of Belize:
Charles III
since
8 September 2022

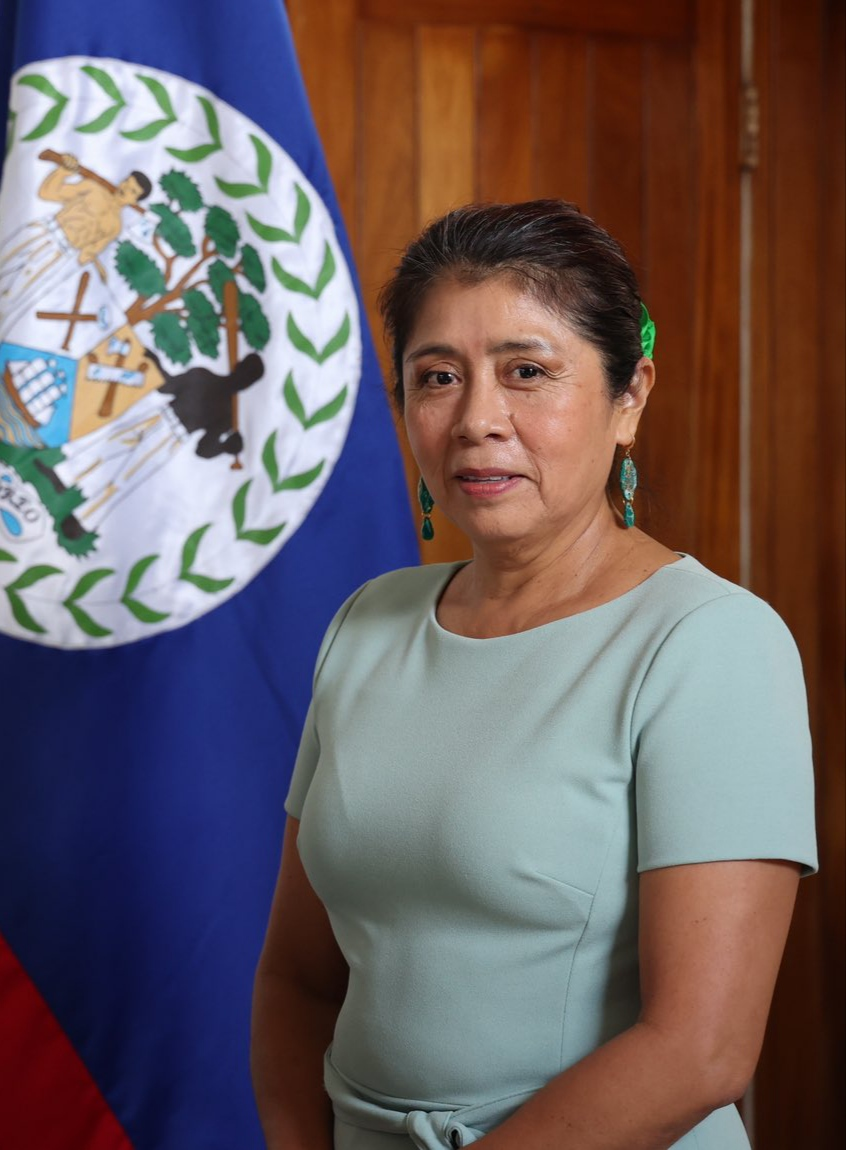
The governor-general of Belize:
Froyla Tzalam
since
27 May 2021

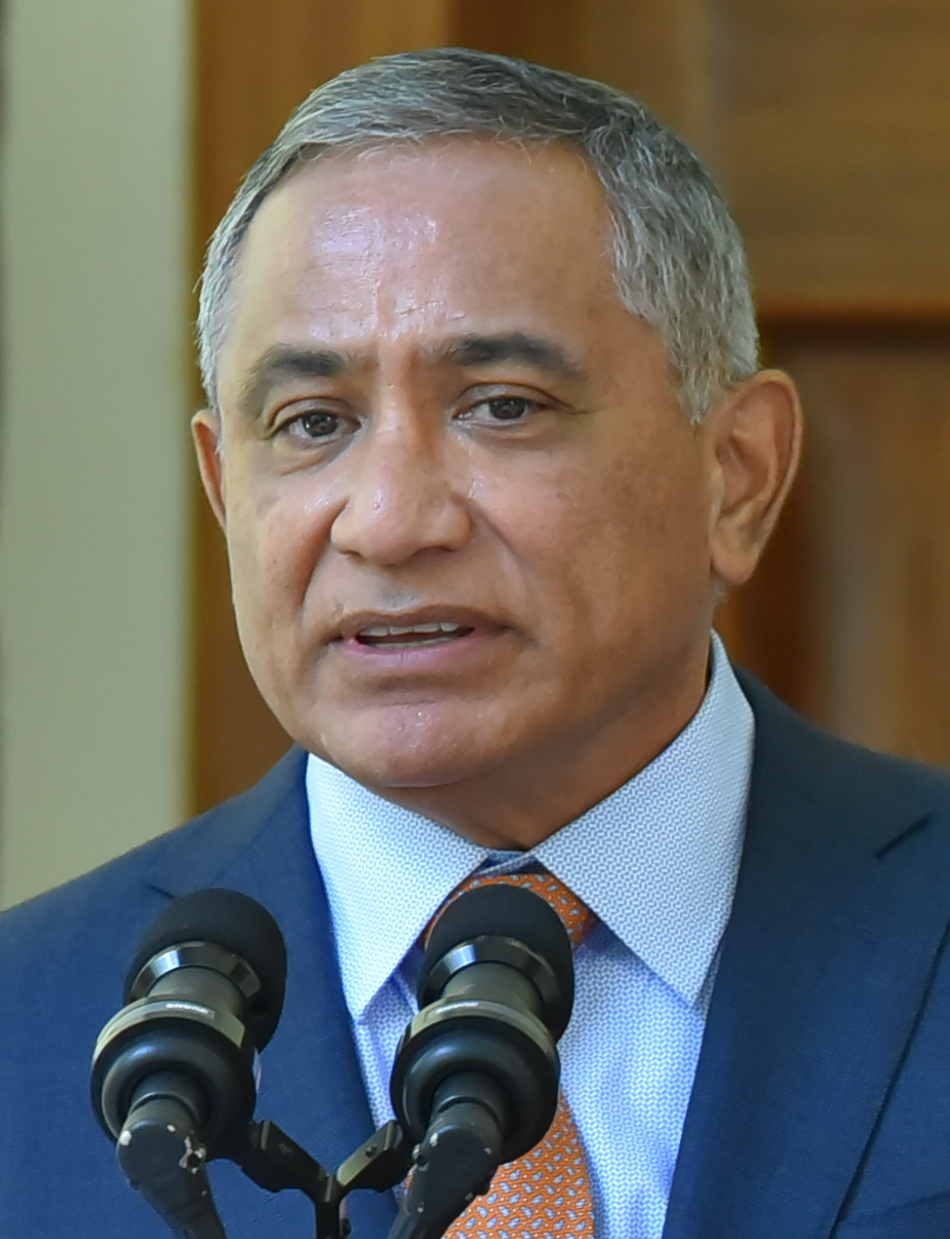
The prime minister of Belize:
Johnny Briceño
since
12 November 2020

The king of Belize is represented in Belize by a governor-general who acts on the advice of the prime minister and the cabinet.

Belize is a constitutional monarchy and parliamentary, its democracy is based on the Westminster model. Belize is a member of the Commonwealth of Nations. Charles III is head of state and is represented in the country by Governor General Her Excellency Froyla Tzalam, who is the country's third governor-general. The primary executive organ of government is the cabinet, led by a prime minister. Cabinet ministers are members of the majority political party in Parliament and usually hold elected seats in the National Assembly concurrently with their cabinet positions. Cabinet members can also be drawn from the Senate.

=== Current members of the executive ===
- The Hon. Johnny Briceño, prime minister
- The Hon. Cordel Hyde, deputy prime minister
- Stuart Leslie, cabinet secretary

==== Ministers ====
- The Hon. Jose Abelardo Mai, Agriculture, Food Security, & Enterprise
- The Hon. Rodwell Ferguson, Public Utilities & Logistics
- The Hon. Julius Espat, Infrastructure Development & Housing
- The Hon. Francis Fonseca, Education, Culture, Science & Technology
- The Hon. Florencio Marin Jr, National Defence & Border Security
- The Hon. Oscar Requena, Rural Transformation, Community Development, Labour & Local Government
- The Hon. Dolores Balderamos-Garcia, Human Development, Families & Indigenous People's Affairs
- The Hon. Kevin-Bernard, Sports & E-Governance
- The Hon. Kareem Musa, Home Affairs & New Growth Industries
- The Hon. Orlando Habet, Sustainable Development, Climate Change & Disaster Risk Management
- The Hon. Michel Chebat, Health & Wellness
- The Hon. Anthony Mahler, Tourism & Diaspora Relations
- The Hon. Andre Perez, Blue Economy & Civil Aviation
- The Hon. Henry Charles Usher, Public Service, Constitutional & Political Reform
- The Hon. Magali Marin Young, SC, Attorney General

==== Ministers of State ====
- The Hon. Gilroy Usher Sr, Human Development, Families & Indigenous People's Affair
- The Hon. Ramon "Monchi" Cervantes, Foreign Affairs, Foreign Trade & Immigration
- The Hon. Dr. Louis Zabaneh, Education, Culture, Science & Technology
- The Hon. Ramiro Ramirez, Natural Resources, Petroleum & Mining
- The Hon. Michael Espat, Finance, Economic Development & Investment
- The Hon. Oscar Mira, National Defense & Border Security

== Legislative branch ==
The National Assembly of Belize is a bicameral body which consists of a House of Representatives and a Senate. The 31 members of the House of Representatives are popularly elected to a maximum five-year term of office.

The Senate currently consists of 13 Senators plus the President of the Senate. The Senators are appointed by the Governor General as follows: six on the advice of the Prime Minister, three on the advice of the Leader of the Opposition, one member on the advice of the Belize Council of Churches and the Evangelical Association of Churches, one on the advice of the Belize Chamber of Commerce and Industry and the Belize Business Bureau, one on the advice of the National Trade Union Congress of Belize and the Civil Society Steering Committee, and as of October 2016, one on the advice of non-governmental organizations (NGOs). The President of the Senate is then selected by the 13 Senators, either from amongst themselves or from the general populace.

The President presides over the sessions of the Senate but ordinarily has no voice nor vote in the proceedings (as would an appointed Senator), except to cast a deciding vote. Where the President is selected from amongst the thirteen, the powers of Senator and President of the Senate are vested in this one person. Otherwise, the President has no powers as would ordinarily be vested in a Senator. Over the past few years, there has been much debate over whether the members of the Senate should be appointed or elected. This discussion continues as Belizeans continue to weigh the pros and cons of an elected versus appointed senate.

As of 8 February 2008, the Government of Belize is controlled by the United Democratic Party (Belize) (UDP) which has a confirmed majority in the House of Representatives after general elections of 7 February 2008. The former government, the People's United Party (PUP) is now in Opposition, after having governed Belize from 28 August 1998 to 8 February 2008. The UDP previously governed Belize from 30 June 1993 to 27 August 1998; the PUP had governed from 4 September 1989- 30 June 1993; and the UDP from 14 December 1984-September 4, 1989. Before 1984, the PUP had dominated the electoral scene for more than 30 years and was the party in power when Belize became independent on 21 September 1981.

== Political parties and elections ==
Summary of the 2020 Belizean general election
| Party | Votes | % | Seats | +/– |
|---|---|---|---|---|
| People's United Party | 88,040 | 59.95 | 26 | +14 |
| United Democratic Party | 57,374 | 39.07 | 5 | –14 |
| Belize People's Front | 820 | 0.56 | 0 | New |
| Belize Progressive Party | 548 | 0.37 | 0 | 0 |
| Independents | 69 | 0.05 | 0 | 0 |
| Total | 146,851 | 100.00 | 31 | 0 |
| Valid votes | 146,851 | 98.69 | | |
| Invalid/blank votes | 1,944 | 1.31 | | |
| Total votes | 148,795 | 100.00 | | |
| Registered voters/turnout | 182,815 | 81.39 | | |
Source: Elections & Boundaries Department, The Tribune

== Judicial branch ==
Members of the independent judiciary are appointed. The judicial system includes local magistrates grouped under the Magistrates' Court which hears less serious cases, the Supreme Court (Chief Justice) which hears murder and similarly serious cases, and the Court of Appeal, which hears appeals from convicted individuals seeking to have their sentences overturned. In 2001, Belize joined with most members of CARICOM to campaign for the establishment of the Caribbean Court of Justice, which replaced appeals to the Privy Council in London.

Belize is divided into six districts: Corozal District, Orange Walk District, Belize District, Cayo District, Stann Creek District, and Toledo District. Court cases are also heard in the capital city of Belmopan. The Supreme Court holds hearings from January to December of each year, starting in Belize City and then going to the districts; Magistrates' Court hears cases on most weekdays.

Michelle Arana has served as the acting Chief Justice of the Supreme Court since the retirement of Kenneth Benjamin on 20 March 2020.

A special Family Court has been set up to hear cases regarding child maintenance, domestic violence and spousal abuse, and other similar cases. This court is located in downtown Belize City. A Quick Trial Court processes selected cases especially speedily.

== Local government ==
Belize has a system of local government comprising four types of local authorities: city councils, town councils, village councils and community councils. The two city councils (Belize City and Belmopan) and seven town councils cover the urban population of the country, while village and community councils cover the rural population.

City and town councils consist of a mayor and a number of councilors (ten in Belize City, six in Belmopan and the towns). Mayors and councilors are directly elected to three-year terms, using the first past the post system. The most recent municipal elections were held in March 2006. The mayor (except in Belize City) acts as the chief executive of the city or town, and allocates portfolios to the other councilors.

Village councils consist of a chairperson and six councill-ors, who are directly elected by registered villagers. Village councils in their current form were established by the Village Councils Act 1999, and the first elections for village councils were held in March and April 2003.

According to the Government of Belize website, "urban authorities are responsible for street maintenance and lighting, drains, refuse collection and public cemeteries. They also have discretionary powers over other services including infrastructure, parks and playgrounds, markets and slaughter-houses, public libraries, public buildings and the amenities of the city or town center." Village and community councils have a more limited range of functions: they "encourage and assist co-operation on economic and social development and general welfare", and can run community centers.

Some rural villages in Belize also have an alcalde: a local magistrate who has both an administrative and a judicial role. In addition to presiding over local courts, alcaldes are responsible for managing communal land and act as school officers. This form of local governance is practiced mainly in Mayan communities in Belize, but any rural community can choose to appoint an alcalde.

== Defence ==
The Belize Defence Force (BDF), established in January 1973, consists of a light infantry force of regulars and reservists along with small air and maritime wings. The BDF, currently under the command of Brigadier General David Jones, assumed total defence responsibility from British Forces Belize (BFB) on 1 January 1994. The United Kingdom continues to maintain the British Army Training and Support Unit Belize (BATSUB) to assist in the administration of the Belize Jungle School. The BDF receives military assistance from the United States and the United Kingdom.

Internal security is the domain of the Belize Police Department, currently staffed by about 1,200 police officers established in all six districts. The commissioner of police is Crispin Jeffries (since April 2009)

Drugs in Belize are controlled under the Misuse of Drugs Act. However, other types of crime are becoming more commonplace, and the murder rate has increased, due to unsolved gang-related issues and the presence of drugs on the streets. Due to this high crime rate, the government runs the Restore Belize platform for the betterment of the country.

In 2012 the BDF had developed a new unit they call their intelligence cell. "the Intelligence Cell is the unit that does the gathering of intelligence with respect to both our borders, national security and internal security." They travel around the country and to remote areas via motorbikes that were donated to the BDF.

== Foreign relations ==
Over the decades, Belize's foreign policy has been a left-leaning one. It allies with nations like Cuba, Venezuela and recognises states such as Palestine, Taiwan and the Saharawi Arab Democratic Republic based on the principles of non-interference, anti-imperialism and self-determination. It also maintains cordial relations with the United States and other western nations which traditionally are its most important trade partners. In a regional context, Belize is a member of the Central American Integration System and the Caribbean Community, the latter of which it is more aligned with due to historical and cultural ties. Belize maintains very close relations with Mexico as well.

== See also ==
- Departments of the Government of Belize
