= List of female speakers of national and territorial lower houses =

This list presents female speakers of national and territorial lower houses of their respective countries or territories. The lower house is one of two chambers in a bicameral legislature. The lower house has more power than the upper house. It usually has the power to impeach the executive in presidential republics or remove the prime minister in semi-presidential republics. Its members are elected by popular votes, compared to the upper house members who are usually appointed.

== National ==
Denotes incumbent speaker

Name	Image	Country	Legislative Body	Mandate start	Mandate end	Term length
Ragnhildur Helgadóttir		Iceland	Lower House of the Althing	1961	1962	1 year, 0 days
Ragnhildur Helgadóttir		Iceland	Lower House of the Althing	1974	1978	4 years, 0 days
Marta Andrade del Rosal		Mexico	Chamber of Deputies	1 November 1965	30 November 1965	29 days
Marta Andrade del Rosal		Mexico	Chamber of Deputies	1 October 1977	31 October 1977	30 days
Luz María Zaleta de Elsner		Mexico	Chamber of Deputies	1 September 1966	30 September 1966	29 days
Annemarie Renger		West Germany	Bundestag	13 December 1972	14 December 1976	4 years, 1 day
María Aurelia de la Cruz Espinosa Ortega		Mexico	Chamber of Deputies	1 November 1973	30 November 1973	29 days
Concepción Rivera Centeno		Mexico	Chamber of Deputies	1 October 1974	31 October 1974	30 days
Elisabeth Blunschy		Switzerland	National Council	2 May 1977	28 November 1977	210 days
Nilde Iotti		Italy	Chamber of Deputies	20 June 1979	22 April 1992	12 years, 307 days
Lidia Gueiler Tejada		Bolivia	Chamber of Deputies	August 1979	November 1979	92 days
Beatriz Paredes Rangel		Mexico	Chamber of Deputies	1 September 1979	30 September 1979	29 days
Beatriz Paredes Rangel		Mexico	Chamber of Deputies	1 October 1985	31 October 1985	30 days
Beatriz Paredes Rangel		Mexico	Chamber of Deputies	1 September 2001	30 September 2001	29 days
Jeanne Sauvé		Canada	House of Commons	14 April 1980	15 January 1984	3 years, 276 days
Hedi Lang		Switzerland	National Council	28 November 1981	28 November 1982	1 year, 0 days
Irma Cué Sarquis		Mexico	Chamber of Deputies	1 September 1983	30 September 1983	29 days
Luz Lajous de Madrazo		Mexico	Chamber of Deputies	1 December 1983	31 December 1983	30 days
Lindsay Bolden		Barbados	House of Assembly	1984	1986	2 years, 0 days
Elba Esther Gordillo		Mexico	Chamber of Deputies	1 September 1983	30 September 1983	29 days
Elba Esther Gordillo		Mexico	Chamber of Deputies	1 September 1987	30 September 1987	29 days
Joan Child		Australia	House of Representatives	11 February 1986	28 August 1989	3 years, 198 days
Rita Süssmuth		Germany	Bundestag	25 November 1988	26 October 1998	9 years, 335 days
Socorro Díaz Palacios		Mexico	Chamber of Deputies	1 December 1988	31 December 1988	30 days
María Maluenda		Chile	Chamber of Deputies	11 March 1990	11 March 1990	0 days
María Claudia Esqueda Llanes		Mexico	Chamber of Deputies	14 May 1991	15 June 1991	32 days
María Claudia Esqueda Llanes		Mexico	Chamber of Deputies	14 April 1996	30 July 1996	107 days
Occah Seapaul		Trinidad and Tobago	House of Representatives	13 January 1992	27 November 1995	3 years, 318 days
Betty Boothroyd		United Kingdom	House of Commons	27 April 1992	23 October 2000	8 years, 179 days
María de los Ángeles Moreno		Mexico	Chamber of Deputies	1 November 1992	30 November 1992	29 days
Laura Garza Galindo		Mexico	Chamber of Deputies	15 April 1993	14 May 1993	29 days
Takako Doi		Japan	House of Representatives	6 August 1993	27 September 1996	3 years, 52 days
Gret Haller		Switzerland	National Council	28 November 1993	28 November 1994	1 year, 0 days
Bridgett Harris		Antigua and Barbuda	House of Representatives	1994	29 March 2004	10 years, 88 days
Irene Pivetti		Italy	Chamber of Deputies	16 April 1994	8 May 1996	2 years, 22 days
Frene Ginwala		South Africa	National Assembly	9 May 1994	23 April 2004	9 years, 350 days
Judith Stamm		Switzerland	National Council	1996	1997	1 year, 0 days
Violet Neilson		Jamaica	House of Representatives	1997	2003	6 years, 0 days
Rome Italia Johnson		Bahamas	House of Assembly	9 April 1997	22 May 2002	5 years, 43 days
Carlota Vargas Garza		Mexico	Chamber of Deputies	1 December 1994	17 January 1995	47 days
Sofía Valencia Abundis		Mexico	Chamber of Deputies	14 April 1995	17 May 1995	33 days
Rosario Guerra Díaz		Mexico	Chamber of Deputies	1 September 1995	30 September 1995	29 days
Sara Muza Simón		Mexico	Chamber of Deputies	1 December 1996	15 March 1997	104 days
Sylvia Flores		Belize	House of Representatives	1998	2001	3 years, 0 days
Trix Heberlein		Switzerland	National Council	1998	1999	1 year, 0 days
Jeltje van Nieuwenhoven		Netherlands	Tweede Kamer	20 May 1998	16 May 2002	3 years, 361 days
Gloria Lavara		Mexico	Chamber of Deputies	1 December 1998	15 December 1998	14 days
Ntlhoi Motsamai		Lesotho	National Assembly	1999	2012	13 years, 0 days
Ntlhoi Motsamai		Lesotho	National Assembly	10 March 2015	12 June 2017	2 years, 94 days
Nancy Patricia Gutiérrez		Colombia	Chamber of Representatives	20 July 1999	20 July 2000	1 year, 0 days
Rafaela Alburquerque		Dominican Republic	Chamber of Deputies	16 August 1999	16 August 2003	4 years, 0 days
Luisa Fernanda Rudi		Spain	Congress of Deputies	5 April 2000	8 April 2004	4 years, 3 days
Elizabeth Zabaneh		Belize	House of Representatives	2001	2008	7 years, 0 days
Liliane Maury Pasquier		Switzerland	National Council	28 November 2001	28 November 2002	1 year, 0 days
Adriana Muñoz D'Albora		Chile	Chamber of Deputies	17 March 2002	17 March 2003	1 year, 0 days
Isabel Allende		Chile	Chamber of Deputies	11 March 2003	11 March 2004	1 year, 0 days
Giselle Isaac-Arrindell		Antigua and Barbuda	House of Representatives	29 March 2004	June 2014	10 years, 64 days
Baleka Mbete		South Africa	National Assembly	23 April 2004	25 September 2008	4 years, 155 days
Baleka Mbete		South Africa	National Assembly	21 May 2014	22 May 2019	5 years, 1 day
Zulema Jattin Corrales		Colombia	Chamber of Representatives	20 July 2004	20 July 2005	1 year, 0 days
Nora Castro		Uruguay	Chamber of Deputies	1 March 2005	1 March 2006	1 year, 0 days
Thérèse Meyer		Switzerland	National Council	8 March 2005	28 November 2005	265 days
Marcela González Salas		Mexico	Chamber of Deputies	1 February 2006	16 May 2006	104 days
Barbara Prammer		Austria	National Council	30 October 2006	2 August 2014	7 years, 276 days
Christine Egerszegi		Switzerland	National Council	28 November 2006	28 November 2007	1 year, 0 days
Gerdi Verbeet		Netherlands	Tweede Kamer	6 December 2006	20 September 2012	5 years, 289 days
Nancy Pelosi		United States	House of Representatives	4 January 2007	3 January 2011	3 years, 364 days
Nancy Pelosi		United States	House of Representatives	3 January 2019	3 January 2023	4 years, 0 days
Sarah Flood-Beaubrun		Saint Lucia	House of Assembly	9 January 2007	September 2008	1 year, 236 days
Patricia Etteh		Nigeria	House of Representatives	6 June 2007	30 October 2007	146 days
María Elena Álvarez Bernal		Mexico	Chamber of Deputies	27 June 2007	31 August 2007	65 days
Ruth Zavaleta		Mexico	Chamber of Deputies	1 September 2007	31 August 2008	365 days
Diloram Tashmukhamedova		Uzbekistan	Legislative Chamber	23 January 2008	12 January 2015	6 years, 354 days
Fahmida Mirza		Pakistan	National Assembly	19 March 2008	3 June 2013	5 years, 76 days
Rosemary Husbands-Mathurin		Saint Lucia	House of Assembly	September 2008	6 January 2012	3 years, 127 days
Gwen Mahlangu-Nkabinde		South Africa	National Assembly	25 September 2008	6 May 2009	223 days
Rose Mukantabana		Rwanda	Chamber of Deputies	6 October 2008	3 October 2013	4 years, 362 days
Chiara Simoneschi-Cortesi		Switzerland	National Council	28 November 2008	28 November 2009	1 year, 0 days
Roberta Anastase		Romania	Chamber of Deputies	19 December 2008	3 July 2012	3 years, 197 days
Meira Kumar		India	Lok Sabha	4 June 2009	4 June 2014	5 years, 0 days
Ivonne Passada		Uruguay	Chamber of Deputies	1 March 2010	1 March 2011	1 year, 0 days
Alejandra Sepúlveda		Chile	Chamber of Deputies	11 March 2010	15 March 2011	1 year, 4 days
Miroslava Němcová		Czechia	Chamber of Deputies	1 May 2010	28 August 2013	3 years, 119 days
Marisa Dalrymple-Philibert		Jamaica	House of Representatives	13 July 2011	12 December 2011	152 days
Marisa Dalrymple-Philibert		Jamaica	House of Representatives	15 September 2020	26 September 2023	3 years, 11 days
Ewa Kopacz		Poland	Sejm	8 November 2011	22 September 2014	2 years, 318 days
Betty Tejada		Bolivia	Chamber of Deputies	24 July 2012	25 January 2015	2 years, 185 days
Anouchka van Miltenburg		Netherlands	Tweede Kamer	25 September 2012	12 December 2015	3 years, 78 days
Anna Burke		Australia	House of Representatives	9 October 2012	12 November 2013	1 year, 34 days
Maya Graf		Switzerland	National Council	28 November 2012	28 November 2013	1 year, 0 days
Laura Boldrini		Italy	Chamber of Deputies	16 March 2013	22 March 2018	5 years, 6 days
Donatille Mukabalisa		Rwanda	Chamber of Deputies	5 October 2013	14 August 2024	10 years, 314 days
Bronwyn Bishop		Australia	House of Representatives	12 November 2013	2 August 2015	1 year, 263 days
Christine Razanamahasoa		Madagascar	National Assembly	18 February 2014	3 May 2014	74 days
Christine Razanamahasoa		Madagascar	National Assembly	16 July 2019	12 July 2024	4 years, 362 days
Sumitra Mahajan		India	Lok Sabha	5 June 2014	17 June 2019	5 years, 12 days
Doris Bures		Austria	National Council	2 September 2014	9 November 2017	3 years, 68 days
Gabriela Montaño		Bolivia	Chamber of Deputies	25 January 2015	24 January 2019	3 years, 364 days
Małgorzata Kidawa-Błońska		Poland	Sejm	25 June 2015	11 November 2015	139 days
Borjana Krišto		Bosnia and Herzegovina	House of Representatives	9 August 2015	8 April 2016	243 days
Borjana Krišto		Bosnia and Herzegovina	House of Representatives	9 August 2017	8 April 2018	242 days
Borjana Krišto		Bosnia and Herzegovina	House of Representatives	6 December 2018	5 August 2019	242 days
Borjana Krišto		Bosnia and Herzegovina	House of Representatives	6 December 2020	5 August 2021	242 days
Bridgid Annisette-George		Trinidad and Tobago	House of Representatives	23 September 2015	23 May 2025	9 years, 242 days
Christa Markwalder		Switzerland	National Council	28 November 2015	28 November 2016	1 year, 0 days
Khadija Arib		Netherlands	Tweede Kamer	13 December 2015	7 April 2021	5 years, 115 days
Leonne Theodore-John		Saint Lucia	House of Assembly	12 July 2016	20 March 2018	1 year, 251 days
Ana Pastor Julián		Spain	Congress of Deputies	19 July 2016	21 May 2019	2 years, 306 days
Lucía Medina		Dominican Republic	Chamber of Deputies	16 August 2016	16 August 2017	1 year, 0 days
Laura Tucker-Longsworth		Belize	House of Representatives	13 January 2017	6 October 2020	3 years, 267 days
Guadalupe Murguía Gutiérrez		Mexico	Chamber of Deputies	1 March 2017	7 September 2017	190 days
Elisabeth Köstinger		Austria	National Council	9 November 2017	18 December 2017	39 days
Muferiat Kamil		Ethiopia	House of Peoples' Representatives	19 April 2018	18 October 2018	182 days
Maya Fernández Allende		Chile	Chamber of Deputies	11 March 2018	19 March 2019	1 year, 8 days
Gülşat Mämmedowa		Turkmenistan	Assembly (Note: In 2021–2023, the Parliament of Turkmenistan was bicameral.)	30 March 2018	6 April 2023	5 years, 7 days
Gloria Macapagal Arroyo		Philippines	House of Representatives	23 July 2018	30 June 2019	342 days
Marina Carobbio Guscetti		Switzerland	National Council	26 November 2018	2 December 2019	1 year, 6 days
Fawzia Zainal		Bahrain	House of Representatives	12 December 2018	12 December 2022	4 years, 0 days
Cecilia Bottino		Uruguay	Chamber of Representatives	1 March 2019	14 February 2020	350 days
Jeannine Mabunda		DR Congo	National Assembly	24 April 2019	10 December 2020	1 year, 230 days
Meritxell Batet		Spain	Congress of Deputies	21 May 2019	16 August 2023	4 years, 87 days
Thandi Modise		South Africa	National Assembly	22 May 2019	5 August 2021	2 years, 75 days
Elżbieta Witek		Poland	Sejm	9 August 2019	12 November 2023	4 years, 95 days
Laura Rojas Hernández		Mexico	Chamber of Deputies	5 September 2019	2 September 2020	363 days
Puan Maharani		Indonesia	House of Representatives	1 October 2019	Incumbent	6 years, 344 days
Isabelle Moret		Switzerland	National Council	2 December 2019	30 November 2020	364 days
Dulce María Sauri Riancho		Mexico	Chamber of Deputies	2 September 2020	31 August 2021	364 days
Eliane Tillieux		Belgium	Chamber of Representatives	13 October 2020	10 July 2024	3 years, 271 days
Valerie Woods		Belize	House of Representatives	11 December 2020	Incumbent	5 years, 273 days
Vera Bergkamp		Netherlands	Tweede Kamer	7 April 2021	5 December 2023	2 years, 242 days
Jennifer Arias		Colombia	Chamber of Representatives	20 July 2021	20 July 2022	1 year, 0 days
Nosiviwe Mapisa-Nqakula		South Africa	National Assembly	19 August 2021	3 April 2024	5 years, 22 days
Patricia Deveaux		Bahamas	House of Assembly	6 October 2021	Incumbent	4 years, 339 days
Bärbel Bas		Germany	Bundestag	26 October 2021	25 March 2025	3 years, 150 days
Markéta Pekarová Adamová		Czechia	Chamber of Deputies	10 November 2021	8 October 2025	3 years, 332 days
Irène Kälin		Switzerland	National Council	29 November 2021	28 November 2022	364 days
Urška Klakočar Zupančič		Slovenia	National Assembly	13 May 2022	10 April 2026	3 years, 332 days
Yaël Braun-Pivet		France	National Assembly	28 June 2022	Incumbent	4 years, 74 days
Cecilia Moreau		Argentina	Chamber of Deputies	2 August 2022	7 December 2023	1 year, 127 days
Noemí Luna Ayala		Mexico	Chamber of Deputies	14 August 2023	31 August 2023	17 days
Francina Armengol		Spain	Congress of Deputies	17 August 2023	Incumbent	3 years, 24 days
Khuon Sudary		Cambodia	National Assembly	22 August 2023	Incumbent	3 years, 19 days
Marcela Guerra Castillo		Mexico	Chamber of Deputies	1 September 2023	31 August 2024	365 days
Juliet Holness		Jamaica	House of Representatives	26 September 2023	Incumbent	2 years, 349 days
Roelien Kamminga		Netherlands	House of Representatives	6 December 2023	14 December 2023	8 days
Ana Olivera		Uruguay	Chamber of Deputies	1 March 2024	15 February 2025	351 days
Karol Cariola		Chile	Chamber of Deputies	15 April 2024	24 March 2025	343 days
Thoko Didiza		South Africa	National Assembly	14 June 2024	Incumbent	2 years, 88 days
Gertrude Kazarwa		Rwanda	Chamber of Deputies	14 August 2024	Incumbent	2 years, 27 days
Ifigenia Martínez y Hernández		Mexico	Chamber of Deputies	1 September 2024	5 October 2024	34 days
Maja Riniker		Switzerland	National Council	2 December 2024	1 December 2025	364 days
Verona Murphy		Ireland	Dáil Éireann	18 December 2024	Incumbent	1 year, 266 days
Saara Kuugongelwa		Namibia	National Assembly	21 March 2025	Incumbent	1 year, 173 days
Julia Klöckner		Germany	Bundestag	25 March 2025	Incumbent	1 year, 169 days
Kenia López Rabadán		Mexico	Chamber of Deputies	1 September 2025	31 August 2026	364 days
Khalida Boufedeche		Algeria	People's National Assembly	28 July 2026	Incumbent	44 days

== Territorial ==
Name	Image	Territory	Legislative Body	Mandate start	Mandate end	Term length
María L. Gómez Garriga		Puerto Rico	House of Representatives	1945	1945	?
Zaida Cucusa Hernández		Puerto Rico	House of Representatives	11 January 1993	12 December 1996	3 years, 355 days
Jenniffer González		Puerto Rico	House of Representatives	12 January 2009	1 January 2013	3 years, 355 days

== See also ==
- Bicameralism
- List of current presidents of legislatures
- List of legislatures by country
- Lower House
- Parliament
- Speaker (politics)
