= Bernard Q. Pitts =

Belizean politician

The Honourable Bernard Quentin Augustus Pitts CBE

Speaker of the House of Representatives of Belize
- In office 16 July 1993 – 13 July 1998
- Prime Minister: Manuel Esquivel
- Preceded by: Robert Clifton Swift
- Succeeded by: Sylvia Flores

Personal details
- Party: United Democratic Party (Belize)

Bernard Quentin Augustus Pitts, CBE, often known by his initials as B. Q. Pitts, is a Belizean politician and a member of the United Democratic Party of Belize.

== Career ==
Pitts was Speaker of the House of Representatives in the Parliament from 1993 to 1998. He is also a lawyer in private practice, the senior partner in the law firm of Pitts and Elrington along with his Cabinet colleague Wilfred Elrington. Following the Belize Constitution (Seventh Amendment) Bill which removed the Constitution of Belize's requirement that the Attorney-General be a member of the House or Senate, PM Dean Barrow appointed him to the position of AG in place of Elrington. However, his term was marked by poor relations with the Belize Bar Association, particularly over the issue of the Belize Constitution (Ninth Amendment) Bill, and in 2012 Elrington took over the post of AG again, taking everything back to the situation as it was before 2008. Pitts was appointed Commander of the Order of the British Empire (CBE) in the 2012 New Year Honours.

== Personal life ==
Bernard Q. Pitts Sr. is married to Valda Icene Pitts. Pitts's daughter Sharon Pitts-Robateau is also a partner and currently the head of his law firm. Pitts' son Bernard Q. Pitts Jr. is a politician. He ran and was elected under the United Democratic Party banner for a seat on the Belize City Council in the 2012 elections.
