= Emil Arguelles =

Belizean attorney by trade

Speaker of the House of Representatives of Belize
- In office 14 March 2008 – 3 February 2012
- Prime Minister: Dean Barrow
- Preceded by: Elizabeth Zabaneh
- Succeeded by: Michael Peyrefitte

Personal details
- Born: 1972 (age 53–54)
- Party: United Democratic Party (Belize)

Emil Arguelles (born July 4, 1972) is a Belizean attorney by trade. He was the Speaker of the House of Representatives of Belize from March 2008 to February 2012. He has also been a Member of the Executive Board of the Bar Association of Belize, a Councillor of the Board of the Belize Chamber of Commerce & Industry and a Member of the Belize City Council Trade Licensing Board. He was also appointed as Honorary Consul of the Republic of Poland in Belize.

== Education ==
Arguelles attended St. John’s College in Belize and Marquette University in Milwaukee, WI, USA (1993); University of the West Indies, Cave Hill, Barbados, (LL.B (Hons), 1996); Norman Manley Law School, Mona, Kingston, Jamaica (Certificate of Legal Education, 1998).

== Profile ==
Arguelles is presently the managing attorney of Arguelles & Company LLC and specializes in Corporate Law; Intellectual Property; Real Estate and Foreign Investment. He is an active member of several associations: Belize Bar Association; International Bar Association (IBA); UK Society of Trust and Estate Practitioners (STEP); International Tax Planning Association (ITPA); Belize Offshore Practitioners Association (BOPA); International Trademark Association (INTA); Interamerican Association of Intellectual Property (ASIPI); Intellectual Property Owners Association (IPO); MARQUES; Association of Real Estate Brokers of Belize (AREBB). On the 13th January, 2009, Emil Arguelles was presented with the Guatemalan Presidential Medal by the President of Guatemala, H.E. Alvaro Colom Caballeros.
