= Attorney-General of Belize =

Attorney General of Belize
- Incumbent; Anthony Sylvestre S.C since 1 July 2023
- Attorney General's Ministry
- Member of: House of Representatives; Cabinet
- Reports to: Governor-General of Belize; Prime Minister of Belize
- Nominator: Prime Minister of Belize
- Appointer: Governor-General of Belize
- Term length: 5 years
- Constituting instrument: Belize Constitution
- Inaugural holder: Vernon Harrison Courtenay
- Website: www.agm.gov.bz

The Attorney-General of Belize is a cabinet-level official who acts as the principal legal adviser to the government of Belize.

== Overview ==
The position of AG is outlined in Section 42 of the Constitution of Belize, which requires that the AG have been qualified for at least five years to practice as an advocate in a court of unlimited jurisdiction in the Commonwealth of Nations or Ireland. Civil proceedings for and against the State are taken in the name of the Attorney General.

Prior to 2010, the constitution also required that the AG be a member of the House of Representatives or the Senate of Belize. As part of the Belize Constitution (Seventh Amendment) Bill, the government proposed to remove this restriction; the same bill also proposed to replace the right of appeal to the Judicial Committee of the Privy Council with the Caribbean Court of Justice, and to allow dual citizens to become members of Parliament. The thinking behind this amendment was that an unelected AG could avoid becoming embroiled in partisan politics.

Then-AG Wilfred Elrington, who concurrently held the post of Minister of Foreign Affairs and Minister of Foreign Trade, justified the proposed changes by pointing out that he was already overworked due to his three positions, and that changing the requirement would allow the PM to tap the best talent from the private sector to become AG. However, in the House, Mark Espat (PUP) criticised the bill as creating a special privilege for lawyers to get around the ordinary electoral process on their way to the Cabinet, while Said Musa stated that the change should be unnecessary given that the PM already had the power to appoint a 13th member to the Senate; despite these concerns, the bill passed the House (though with the dual-citizenship MP provisions stripped out. In the Senate, Henry Gordon and Godwin Hulse expressed concern over this change, but the bill passed the Senate as well by a vote of eight-to-two with two abstentions.

== List of attorneys-general ==
=== British Honduras (1862–1973) ===
- Alexander Campbell Onslow (1878–1880)
- Henry Rawlins Pipon Schooles (1880–1883)
- William Meigh Goodman (1883–1886)
- Charles Reginald Hoffmeister (1886–1893)
- Leslie Probyn (1893–1896)
- Frederic Mackenzie Maxwell, KC (1896–1907)
  - Henry Eugene Walter Grant (acting) 1902–1903
  - Colin Rees Davies (acting) (1905–?)
- Colin Rees Davies (1907–1913)
- Lancelot Henry Elphinstone (1913–1919)
- George O'Donnell Walton (1919–1921)
- Cyril Gerard Brooke Francis (1921–1924)
- Hon. Willoughby Bullock (acting?) c. 1925-?1928
- Frédéric Pierre Genève, KC (1927–?)
  - Sidney Alexander Roger McKinstry (acting) (December 1930–February 1931)
  - Sidney Alexander Roger McKinstry (acting) (February 1931–?)
- Sidney Alexander Roger McKinstry, 1932–c.1941
  - O.L. Bancroft, acting, 1941
- Harold John Hughes, 1941–1950
- Cyril George Xavier Henriques, 1950–1956
- Charles Francis Henville, OBE, QC, 1956–1965
- John Kingsley Havers, QC c. 1966–1973

=== Belize ===
- Vernon Harrison Courtenay, c. 1974–c. 1979
- Said Musa, 1979–1984 under PM George Cadle Price
- Hubert Elrington, 1984–1986 under PM Manuel Esquivel
- Dean Barrow, 1986–1989 under PM Manuel Esquivel
- Glenn Godfrey 1989–1993 under PM George Cadle Price
- Dean Barrow, 1993–1998 (second) under PM Manuel Esquivel
- Godfrey Smith, 1999–2003 under PM Said Musa
- Eamon Harrison Courtenay SC, 2004–c. 2007 under PM Said Musa
- Francis Fonseca, c. 2007 under PM Said Musa
- Wilfred Elrington, 2008–2010 under PM Dean Barrow
- Bernard Q. Pitts, 2010–2012 under PM Dean Barrow
- Wilfred Elrington (second), 2012–2015 under PM Dean Barrow
- Vanessa Retreage, 2015–2017 under PM Dean Barrow
- Michael Peyrefitte, 2017–2020 under PM Dean Barrow
- Magali Marin-Young, 2020–2023 under PM Johnny Briceño
- Anthony Sylvestre, 2023–present under PM Johnny Briceño
