= Stann Creek West =

Electoral constituency in Belize

- Constituency for the Belize House of Representatives
- District: Stann Creek

Current constituency

Stann Creek West, previously known as Stann Creek Rural, is an electoral constituency in the Stann Creek District represented in the House of Representatives of the National Assembly of Belize.

== Area representatives ==
Election	Area representative	Party
1961	David McKoy	PUP
1965	David McKoy	PUP
1969	David McKoy	PUP
1974	David McKoy	PUP
1979	David McKoy	PUP
1984	David McKoy	PUP
1989	Melvin Hulse	UDP
1993	Melvin Hulse	UDP
1998	Henry George Canton	PUP
2003	Rodwell Ferguson	PUP
2008	Melvin Hulse	UDP
2012	Rodwell Ferguson	PUP
2015	Rodwell Ferguson	PUP
2020	Rodwell Ferguson	PUP

== Elections ==
Election	Political result	Candidate	Party	Votes	%	±%
2025 general election Electorate: 10,597; Turnout: 5,393 (50.89%) −27.63	PUP hold Majority: 2,748 (50.96%) +19.62	Rodwell Ferguson	PUP	3,907	72.45	+8.22
2025 general election Electorate: 10,597; Turnout: 5,393 (50.89%) −27.63	PUP hold Majority: 2,748 (50.96%) +19.62	Ivan Williams	UDP	1,159	21.49	−11.40
2025 general election Electorate: 10,597; Turnout: 5,393 (50.89%) −27.63	PUP hold Majority: 2,748 (50.96%) +19.62	Macario Augustine	UDP	171	3.17	−29.72
2025 general election Electorate: 10,597; Turnout: 5,393 (50.89%) −27.63	PUP hold Majority: 2,748 (50.96%) +19.62	Domingo Francis Valerio	Belizeans Justice Movement	46	0.85	-
2025 general election Electorate: 10,597; Turnout: 5,393 (50.89%) −27.63	PUP hold Majority: 2,748 (50.96%) +19.62	Mateo Tomas Polanco	Independent	24	0.45	-
