= Godfrey Smith (politician) =

Belizean jurist, attorney and politician (born 1968)

Godfrey Smith SC

Member of the Belize House of Representatives for Pickstock
- In office 5 March 2003 – 7 February 2008
- Preceded by: George Cadle Price
- Succeeded by: Wilfred Elrington

Personal details
- Born: 8 May 1968 (age 58) Belize City, British Honduras (now Belize)
- Party: People's United Party
- Education: University of the West Indies; Tufts University

Godfrey P. Smith (born 8 May 1968) is a Belizean jurist, attorney and politician. A member of the People's United Party (PUP), Smith is a former member of the Belize House of Representatives.

== Career ==
Smith was named Attorney-General of Belize in 1999. In 2003 he became Minister of Foreign Affairs, Defence and National Emergency Management Organization.

Smith defeated Bobby Usher, the nephew of former Prime Minister George Cadle Price, to receive the PUP's nomination as its candidate for Pickstock constituency in the 2003 election. Price had represented Pickstock since 1989, a constituency that had always been held by the PUP. Smith won the seat in the 2003 election and ran for a second term in the February 2008 election, facing Wilfred Elrington of the United Democratic Party (UDP). This time Smith was defeated, and the PUP lost power in the election.

In August 2004, Smith was part of the G-7 group of ministers who demanded the dismissal of Ralph Fonseca from the Cabinet and resigned when Prime Minister Said Musa did not meet that demand. Later, Smith was re-elected as one of the PUP's deputy leaders in July 2007. In April 2006 he gave up the foreign and defense ministries and became minister of tourism, information and emergency management. Godfrey smith was also a writer. He wrote the biography of Honorable George Cadle Price, and is currently writing the biography of a Jamaican government official. He also recently wrote a biography of Mr Norman Manley of Jamaica. Smith is now serving as a Justice of the Supreme Court of Saint Lucia.

== Education and personal life ==
Smith was born in Belize City. From 1989 to 1994, he attended the University of the West Indies, where he received a LL.B. degree. Smith also has a Legal Education Certificate from Norman Manley Law School. He later received a Master of Arts in international relations from Tufts University's Fletcher School of Law and Diplomacy in Massachusetts in 2002. He is married to Valerie Woods, who has been Speaker of the country's House of Representatives since December 2020.
