= Elizabeth Zabaneh =

Belizean politician

Mary Elizabeth Zabaneh

President of the Belize Senate
- In office 12 September 1998 – July 2001
- Prime Minister: Said Musa
- Preceded by: Edward Flowers
- Succeeded by: Sylvia Flores

Speaker of the House of Representatives of Belize
- In office 3 August 2001 – 7 January 2008
- Prime Minister: Said Musa
- Preceded by: Sylvia Flores
- Succeeded by: Emil Arguelles

Personal details
- Party: People's United Party

Elizabeth Zabaneh O.B.E. is a Belizean politician from People's United Party.

She was President of the Senate from September 1998 to July 2001. She was Speaker of the House of Representatives from August 2001 to January 2008.

She is a daughter of Jane Ellen Usher. Prime Minister George Cadle Price was her uncle.

She has been a commissioner of the Supreme Court of Belize since 1991. She has been the treasurer of Holy Redeemer Credit Union since 2015.
