= Sylvia Flores =

Belizean politician (died 2022)

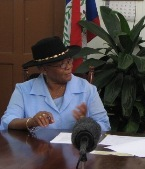

President of the Belize Senate
- In office 14 August 2001 – 4 February 2003
- Prime Minister: Said Musa
- Preceded by: Elizabeth Zabaneh
- Succeeded by: Philip Zuniga

Speaker of the House of Representatives of Belize
- In office 12 September 1998 – 1 July 2001
- Prime Minister: Said Musa
- Preceded by: Bernard Q. Pitts
- Succeeded by: Elizabeth Zabaneh

Personal details
- Party: People's United Party

Sylvia Sarita Flores (c. 1951 – 8 December 2022) was a Belizean politician and educator. She was the first woman to be speaker of the House of Representatives and to be acting prime minister of Belize.

== Early life ==
The daughter of Evelyn Avila and Santos Flores, she was born in Dangriga and was raised by her stepfather Bernard Rhys. She attributed her career to her mother, Avila, who was one of the founding members of the People's United Party in Dangriga and took her to public meetings to meet politicians. She attended primary school at Sacred Heart and Stann Creek High School, where she was valedictorian in 1971. She taught Spanish at a high school in Dangriga. She went on to earn a BA in economics and political science from Hunter College in New York City. She returned to Belize and, in 1983, was named a justice of the peace. In 1988, Flores became the first woman mayor of Dangriga, serving two terms.

== Career ==
Flores was the Speaker of the House of Representatives from 1998 to 2001, and was President of the Senate from 2001 to 2003. In 2003, Flores was elected as representative for Dangriga; she was named Minister of Defence and National Emergency Management. In 2005, she was named Minister of Human Development and Women. After retiring from politics, she returned to teaching. She taught Spanish at her alma mater Stann Creek High School, economics at the junior level, and Spanish and English at Delille Academy for free.

In 2013, she was named Woman of the Year by the United States Embassy in Belize.

== Personal life and death ==
Flores suffered from diabetes, and her health deteriorated further after a stroke. She died on 8 December 2022, at the age of 71. Her official funeral was held on 16 December 2022, where John Briceno gave the official remembrance speech.
