= Alexander Albert Hunter =

Belizean politician (1920–1996)

The Honourable Sir Alexander Albert Hunter KBE

Speaker of the House of Representatives of Belize
- Monarch: Elizabeth II

Personal details
- Born: 21 May 1920 Belize
- Died: 27 August 1996 (aged 76)
- Party: People's United Party
- Occupation: Politician
- Profession: Administrator

Sir Alexander Albert Hunter, KBE (21 May 1920 – 27 August 1996) was a Belizean politician. He served as Speaker of the House of Representatives from 8 November 1974 to 27 July 1979.

== Background ==
=== Early life ===
Hunter was born in 1920 as the son of Laura Mary, née Reyes (25 March 1885 – 1 September 1924) and Alexander John Hunter (died 7 July 1924). He was born in Belize City, Belize. Fred Hunter was his half-brother.

=== Education ===
Hunter graduated from the St. John's College in Belize City to Regis College in Denver, Colorado. He studied radiation physics at Queen's University in Kingston, Canada.

== Political career ==
In the 1961 parliamentary election in British Honduras, he was a candidate for the PUP in the constituency of Fort George and won the election with 60.2% of the vote against Herbert Fuller of the NIP and Denbigh Jeffery of the CDP. From the 1965 election (54.3% of the vote against Helen Taylor, NIP) to the 1969 election (50.9% against Dean Lindo, NIP). He served under Prime Minister George Cadle Price as Minister for Natural Resources and later as Minister for Industry.

Hunter was appointed Knight Commander of the Order of the British Empire in the Diplomatic Service and Overseas List of the 1976 New Years Honours Lists.
