= Wilfred Elrington =

Belizean politician

The Honourable Wilfred "Sedi" Elrington LLB CLE
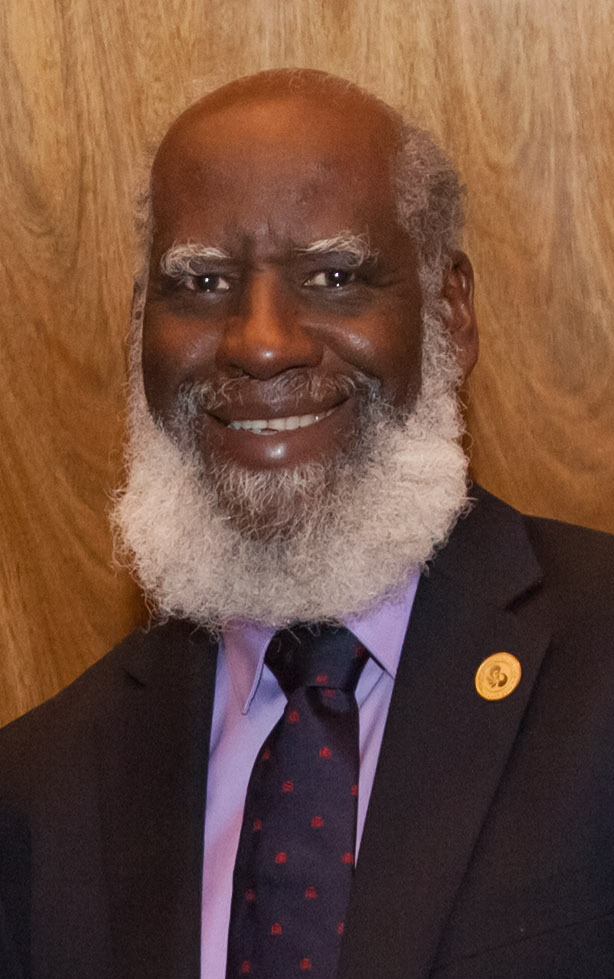
- Elrington in 2014

Member of the Belize House of Representatives for Pickstock
- Incumbent
- Assumed office 7 February 2008
- Preceded by: Godfrey Smith

Personal details
- Born: 20 November 1948 (age 77) Belize City, British Honduras (now Belize)
- Party: United Democratic Party
- Spouse: Barbara Wright Elrington
- Children: 4
- Education: University of the West Indies

Wilfred Peter "Sedi" Elrington (born 20 November 1948) is a Belizean politician who has been the Foreign Minister of Belize since 2008.

== Biography ==
Elrington read law at the University of the West Indies. He is the only Belizean who has served in the executive, the legislative and the judicial arms of government, having served as a part-time judge of the Supreme Court of Belize.

Elrington was the Attorney-General of Belize and Minister of Foreign Affairs and Trade from February 12, 2008 to 2010. A reshuffle of the Cabinet in 2010 left him with just Foreign Affairs and Foreign Trade. In 2012 he was again made the Attorney General of Belize. He remains the Minister of Foreign Affairs.

In 2009, he successfully managed to turn Guatemala's long-time ally Israel into a partner of Belize.

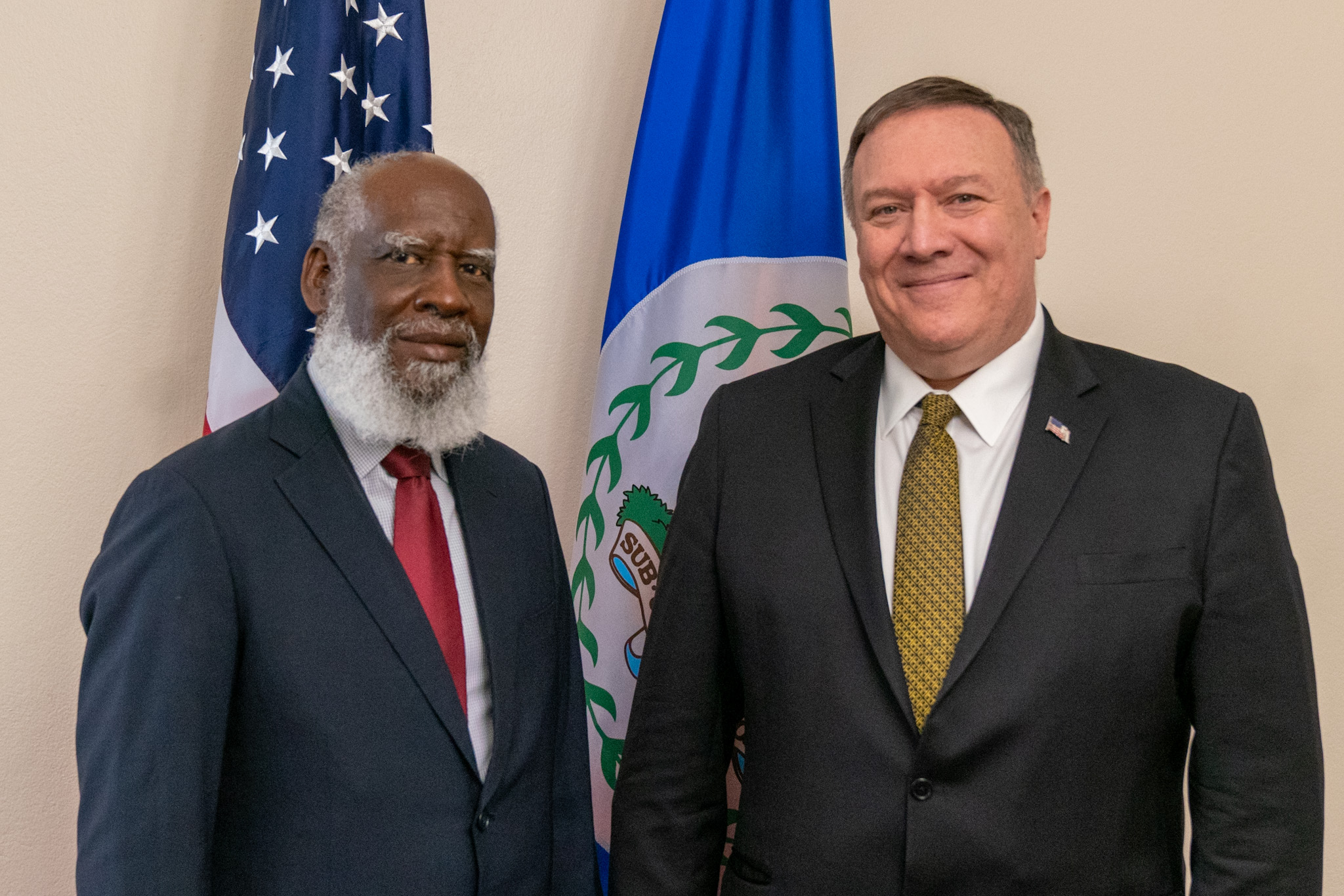
Erlington meets with U.S. Secretary of State Michael R. Pompeo in Kingston, Jamaica on January 22, 2020.

As foreign minister under Dean Barrow, Elrington is noted for his conciliatory tone regarding the Belizean–Guatemalan territorial dispute, a stance which has become especially controversial in Belize in light of 2015 Guatemalan presidential candidate Jimmy Morales' comments on the issue, which are decidedly pro-Belize annexation. Sandra Jovel became Guatemala's minister of foreign affairs in August 2017, and immediately gained Elrington's esteem and respect.

In July 2017, as shareholder of the company Progresso Heights Limited, Elrington was taken to court to clarify many transfers of lands where proof of initial ownership cannot be demonstrated. In August 217, he was ordered by the court to provide all documentation related to this affair. That same month, he was part of a delegation representing the Caribbean countries to meet with representatives of the US president Donald Trump.

In January 2018, Elrington expressed his surprise when the USA announced it was temporarily stopping to issue temporary work visa programme for Belizeans, on the basis that the country is not doing enough to do more in preventing human trafficking.

== Electoral history ==
Elrington ran as the UDP candidate for the Belize City-based Pickstock constituency in 1993 and 1998, but was defeated both times by former PUP Prime Minister George Cadle Price. Price retired from the Belize House in 2003. That year Elrington ran for the Pickstock seat as an independent, but finished second to the PUP's Godfrey Smith.

Returning to the UDP, Elrington contested the Pickstock seat a fourth consecutive time in 2008 and finally prevailed, defeating Smith by a 56-42 margin. He was re-elected in 2012, narrowly defeating the PUP's Francis Donald Smith.

== Personal life ==
Elrington is married to Barbara Yolanda Jean Elrington and has four children. His brother, former UDP Area Representative Hubert Elrington, also served as the attorney general for Belize.

Elrington speaks Spanish and is a member of the Trinity Methodist Church. He enjoys farming and journalism.

== See also ==
- List of foreign ministers in 2017
- List of current foreign ministers

Political offices
| Preceded by Lisa Shoman | Foreign Minister of Belize; 2008–present | Incumbent |
