= Charles Hyde =

Charles Hyde may refer to:

- Charles Hyde (sport shooter) (1904–1982), British sports shooter
- Charles McEwen Hyde (1832–1899), Congregationalist missionary
- Charles Bartlett Hyde (1923–2024), Belizean politician
- Sir Charles Hyde, 1st Baronet (1876–1942), British newspaper proprietor
