= Woldrich Harrison Courtenay =

Belizean politician

The Honourable Woldrich Harrison Courtenay

Speaker of the House of Representatives of Belize
- In office 12 March 1965 – 3 October 1974
- Monarch: Elizabeth II

Personal details
- Born: Belize
- Party: People's United Party
- Occupation: Politician
- Profession: Administrator

Woldrich Harrison Courtenay was a Belizean politician, serving as Speaker of the House of Representatives from 12 March 1965 to 3 October 1974. He was born in 1904 and first worked as a civil servant in British Honduras (1920–1937), before studying law at London University. He graduated as a Doctor of Laws from Lincoln's Inn in 1936, and also worked as a radio announcer in the Anglican Church of British Honduras. He was married to Josephine, née Robinson.
