= Melvin Hulse =

Belizean politician (1947–2022)

Melvin Hulse (1947 – 5 April 2022) was a Belizean politician, born in the then Crown Colony of British Honduras. He was the Minister of Public Utilities and Transport and Communications in Belize. He attended Lynam College and served with the then British Honduras Volunteer Guard.

Hulse was a member of the House of Representatives for Stann Creek West.

Hulse was diagnosed with cancer and died on 5 April 2022.
