= Laura Tucker-Longsworth =

Belizean politician

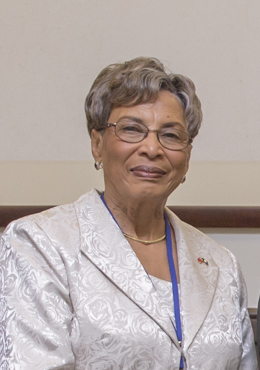

Speaker of the House of Representatives of Belize
- In office 13 January 2017 – 6 October 2020
- Prime Minister: Dean Barrow
- Preceded by: Michael Peyrefitte
- Succeeded by: Valerie Woods

Personal details
- Party: United Democratic Party (Belize)

Laura Tucker-Longsworth OBE is a politician and nurse in Belize. In January 2017, she became the Speaker of the Belize House of Representatives.

== Education ==
Tucker-Longsworth holds a master's degree in nursing. She is a co-ordinator for the Registered Nurse bachelor's programme at the University of the West Indies Open Campus in Belize.

== Career ==
She was a founding member of the Belize Cancer Society, also serving as its president. She is chair of the National AIDS Commission and of the disciplinary committee for the Nurses and Midwives Council of Belize. Tucker-Longsworth is also a director of the Healthy Caribbean Coalition.

In 2015, she was appointed an Officer of the Order of the British Empire.
