= Charles Bartlett Hyde =

Belizean politician

The Honourable Charles Bartlett Hyde CBE

Speaker of the House of Representatives of Belize
- In office 30 November 1979 – 9 November 1984
- Monarch: Elizabeth II
- Governor General: Dame Minita Gordon
- Prime Minister: George Cadle Price

Personal details
- Born: June 3, 1923 Belize
- Died: March 23, 2024 (aged 100)
- Party: People's United Party
- Occupation: Politician
- Profession: Administrator

Charles Bartlett Hyde, CBE, was a Belizean politician. He served as Speaker of the House of Representatives from 30 November 1979 to 9 November 1984. During the birthday of Queen Elizabeth II on her silver coronation anniversary in 1977, Hyde was made a Member of the Order of the British Empire. In 1998 he was made a Commander of the Order of the British Empire.

== Background ==
=== Early life ===
Hyde was born in 1923 to Eunice, née Locke, and James Bartlett Hyde in Belize City (then the capital of British Honduras). He attended St. John's College then entered the administrative service of British Honduras. In October 1946, he married Elinor Belisle. The couple raised seven sons and two daughters, of whom Dartmouth's Evan X Hyde is the eldest.

== Political career ==
In the administrative service of British Honduras, Hyde met various authorities and in 1944 went to the post office of Belize. In 1959 he returned for twelve months to the General Post Office in Great Britain. At the Belize Post Office he was Assistant Postmaster from 1960 to 1962. He retired as Postmaster General in 1978.

== Legacy ==
The Charles Bartlett Hyde Building, an administrative building on Mahogany Street in Belize City, was named after Hyde in 2008. The building was renovated in 1995 and was formerly known as Complex Building.
