= Restore Belize =

Belizean government programme

- Formation: 2010-06-02
- Legal status: Active
- Purpose: To create a safe, vibrant environment for residents through inclusive, multi-sectoral, and citizen-centered action
- Location: Belize
- Leader: Hon. Dean Barrow- Former Prime Minister of Belize
- Website: http://www.restorebelize.gov.bz/

Restore Belize is an organization based in Belize and directed by the government of Belize. Founded by former Prime Minister Dean Barrow on June 2, 2010, its primary aim is to make Belize a more peaceful and productive nation by implementing law, order, and community building through active citizenship.

== History ==
Restore Belize was established in response to the rising crime rate in Belize. The organization's main objectives include human development, economic development, citizen prosperity, democratic governance, and citizen security. To achieve these goals, the Belizean government, civil society, and private sector collaborate in formulating public involvement programs.

== Programs ==
=== Conflict Mediation ===
The conflict mediation program aims to equip communities with problem-solving skills, such as conflict reduction, respectful communication, and creative problem-solving techniques. Activities conducted by this program include mediation training workshops and peer-to-peer mediation programs.

=== I am Belize ===
I am Belize is a public education program that seeks to instill social values and positivity. The program's goal is for Belizeans to embrace positive behavior and cultural identity, transforming Belize into a safe, peaceful, and productive country. Advocated values include national pride, courtesy, fairness, inclusion, integrity, lifelong education, responsible citizenship, and rule of law. The program achieves these values by providing scholarships to youths and engaging them in various activities and programs, such as the morning shows Wake up Belize and Peace in the Parks, as well as motivational missionary tours.

=== Youth Police Initiative ===
The Youth Police Initiative focuses on fostering positive changes in the relationships between at-risk youths, the police department, and community organizations. The initiative's main objectives include helping police officers better understand the values, beliefs, and experiences of the community's younger generation, developing genuine relationships between the youth and police officers, and encouraging youths to consider and understand the challenges faced by police officers in their daily work. Activities in this initiative involve youths participating in role-play scenarios with trained personnel, providing feedback during debriefing, and interacting with police officers in training to complete course activities and team building exercises. These interactions help officers learn how to communicate more effectively with youths by constructively engaging with them.

== Partners ==
Restore Belize collaborates with three main sectors of society: the government, civil society, and the private sector. It also partners with international development agencies. As a government-directed organization, it comprises a significant portion of government ministries, departments, and program units. The organization includes six cabinet ministers: the Ministry of National Security, Education, Youth, Sports, Health, Human Development, Social Transformation and Poverty Alleviation, Labour, Local Government, Rural Development, NEMO, and Immigration and Nationality; and is headed by the Prime Minister.
