= Janelle Chanona =

Belizean journalist, advocate and parliamentarian

Janelle Andrea Chanona is a marine policy advocate and member of parliament in Belize’s National Assembly serving as a non-partisan Senator, representing Belizean Non-Governmental Organizations (NGOs).

== Career ==
Between 1999 and 2008, Chanona worked as a journalist, anchor and news director for Great Belize Productions, managed then by Stewart Krohn. Chanona (and her respective camera colleagues) received several awards from the Caribbean Broadcasting Union (CBU), various United Nations agencies, the Pan American Health Organization (PAHO) and the International Center for Journalists.

Chanona is a recipient of the James A. Waight award, which is awarded annually by the Belize Audubon Society for journalism work in support of conservation in Belize.

=== Marine Policy Advocate ===
Chanona has led Oceana's team in Belize since January 2014.

=== Parliamentarian ===
In March 2022, registered non-governmental organizations in Belize elected Chanona as the 13th Senator, a non-partisan representative in the Senate, the upper house of Belize's National Assembly. Chanona was endorsed to continue work as the Senator for NGOs and swore the oath of office on May 9, 2025.

During her first parliamentary session, Chanona was the first Chair of the National Assembly's newest joint standing committee, the Women's Parliamentary Caucus.

== Education ==
A recipient of the Chevening scholarship in 2000, Janelle Chanona holds a Master's Degree with distinction in Investigative Journalism from Nottingham Trent University in Nottingham, England.
