= Marina Carobbio Guscetti =

Swiss politician (born 1966)

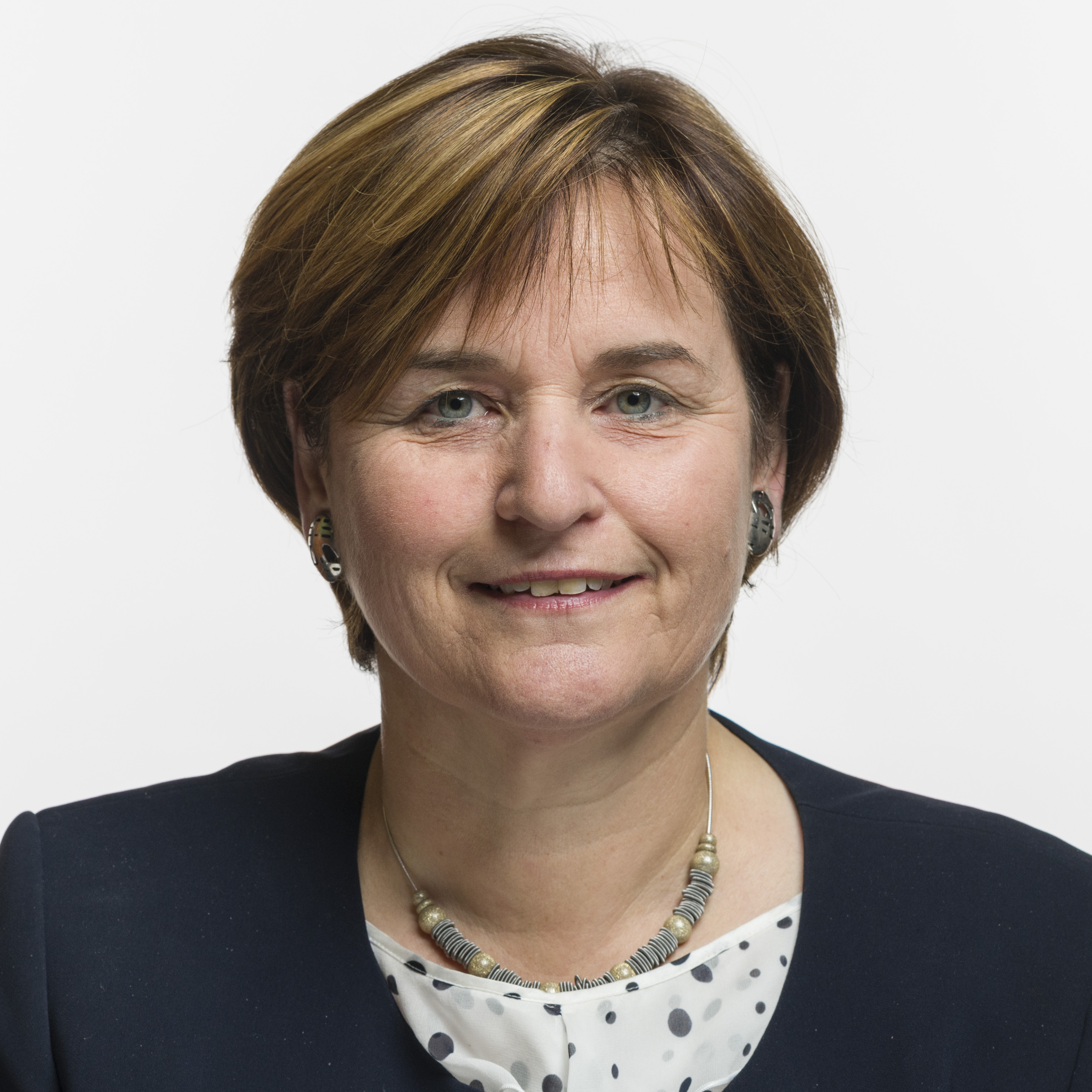

Councillor of States
- Incumbent
- Assumed office 2 December 2019
- Preceded by: Filippo Lombardi

Vice-chairwoman of the Social Democratic Party of Switzerland
- Incumbent
- Assumed office 1 March 2008

President of the National Council
- In office 26 November 2018 – 1 December 2019
- Preceded by: Dominique de Buman
- Succeeded by: Isabelle Moret

National Councillor
- In office 4 June 2007 – 1 December 2019
- Preceded by: Franco Cavalli
- Succeeded by: Bruno Storni

Deputy to the Grand Council of Ticino
- In office April 1991 – March 2007

Personal details
- Born: Marina Carobbio; 12 June 1966 (age 60) Bellinzona, Ticino
- Party: Social Democratic Party of Switzerland
- Occupation: Physician

Marina Carobbio Guscetti (born 12 June 1966) is a Swiss politician of the Social Democratic Party of Switzerland (SP/PS) of which she has been the vice-chairwoman since 1 March 2008. She was the president of the National Council in 2018–2019 and became a Councillor of States in December 2019.

== Life ==
She is originally from Campo Blenio, Ticino and resides in Lumino, Ticino. She is the daughter of Werner Carobbio, who was a Socialist National Councillor for 24 years. She is a physician and mother of two.

After she graduated in medicine from the University of Basel in 1991, she specialised in palliative medicine.

Marina Carobbio Guscetti has been chairing the Mieterverband since 16 October 2010. Moreover, she has been the vice-chairwoman of the Alpen-Initiative since 2013.

=== Political career ===
She was a deputy to the Grand Council of Ticino from April 1991 to March 2007, before she became a National Councillor on 4 June 2007. She sat in the Science, Education and Culture Committees of the 47th Parliament, then in the Finance Committee and the Drafting Committee of the 48th Parliament.

On 26 October 2011 she announced she was a candidate to the succession of Federal Councillor Micheline Calmy-Rey. However, her candidacy was not accepted in the ticket chosen by the Socialist parliamentary group.

On 26 November 2018 Marina Carrobio Guscetti became the president of the Swiss National Council.

In the 2019 federal election, she was elected to the Council of States alongside Marco Chiesa. She became the first woman to ever represent the canton of Ticino in the Council of States.

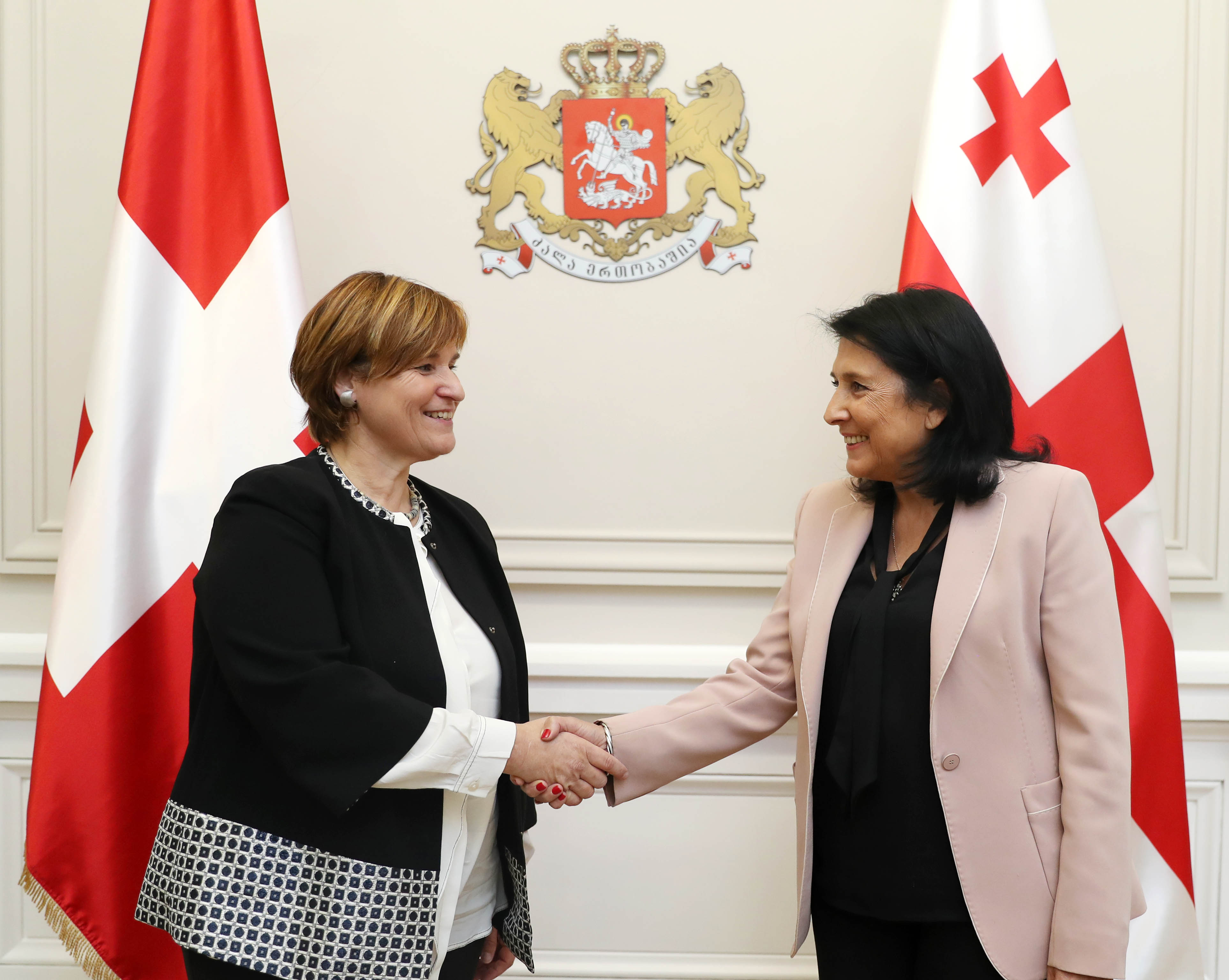
Georgian President Salome Zourabichvili meeting with Marina Carobbio Guscetti in her function as President of the Swiss National Council, in Tbilisi, 2019.

== See also ==
- List of female speakers of national and territorial lower houses
- List of presidents of the National Council of Switzerland
- List of members of the National Council of Switzerland, 2011–15
- List of members of the National Council of Switzerland, 2007–11
- List of members of the National Council of Switzerland, 2003–07
- List of members of the Federal Assembly from the Canton of Ticino
