= Valerie Woods =

Belizean politician

The Honourable Valerie Woods
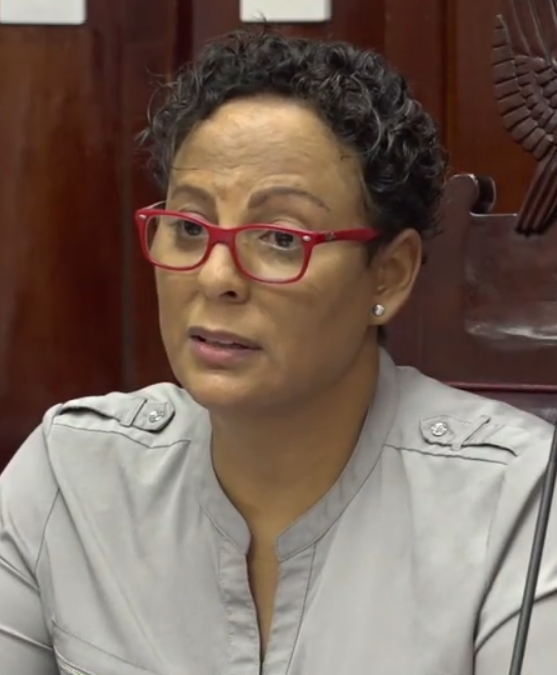
- Woods in 2021

Speaker of the House of Representatives of Belize
- Incumbent
- Assumed office December 11, 2020
- Monarchs: Elizabeth II; Charles III
- Governors General: Colville Young; Froyla Tzalam
- Prime Minister: Johnny Briceño
- Preceded by: Laura Tucker-Longsworth

Personal details
- Born: 1973 (age 52–53) Belize City, Belize
- Party: People's United Party
- Spouse: Godfrey Smith
- Profession: Administrator, Business advisor

Valerie Woods Smith (born 1973) is a Belizean politician who has served as Speaker of the House of Representatives since December 2020.

== Education ==
Woods has a BSc in Business Administration obtained from Le Moyne College in Syracuse, New York and a master's degree in Tourism Administration from George Washington University in Washington, D.C.

== Career ==
Woods has worked as the Manager of the Protected Areas Conservation Trust, Country Manager of Chukka and Director of Tourism. In 1999, she was appointed acting Permanent Secretary of the Ministry of Tourism. She joined the Board of Friends for Conservation and Development in December 2019.

In addition, Woods is also a member of the People's United Party. In March 2016, she was appointed by party leader Johnny Briceño to one of their three designated Senate seats. Her appointment was a surprise to some, as her husband had challenged Briceno to step down in 2011.

Woods has been an outspoken advocate against discrimination on the basis of gender or sexuality. In August 2016, she initiated a meeting between the LGBTI community and government officials after the Supreme Court overturned Section 53 of the Criminal Code, which punished same-sex relationships with up to ten years in prison. In December 2018, she called for the government to do more to address domestic abuse. In April 2019, she abstained from voting on the Belize Territorial Dispute Referendum Bill as she favoured taking Guatemala to the International Court of Justice. She said, "If my head is to roll, let it roll." She was replaced in the Senate in August that year.

After the 2020 Belizean general election brought the PUP to power after 12 years in opposition, Woods was unanimously elected Speaker of the House of Representatives on 11 December 2020 after being proposed by newly elected Prime Minister Briceño and Deputy Prime Minister Cordel Hyde. In her inaugural address, she said, "...whіlе Веlіzе ѕtіll hаѕ muсh wоrk tо dо іn gеttіng mоrе wоmеn еlесtеd tо Раrlіаmеnt, І rесоgnіzе thаt mу nоmіnаtіоn аnd thаt оf thе Рrеѕіdеnt оf thе Ѕеnаtе, Ноn. Carolyn Trench-Sandiford, ѕіgnаlѕ а rесоgnіtіоn оf thе сrіtісаl іmроrtаnсе оf hаvіng mоrе wоmеn іn lеаdеrѕhір." Woods is also Chair of Caribbean Women in Leadership.

== Personal life ==
Woods is married to Godfrey Smith, former Attorney-General of Belize and a judge of the Supreme Court of Saint Lucia.
