= Frederic Mackenzie Maxwell =

Sir Frederic Mackenzie Maxwell, KC (11 January 1860 – 9 May 1931) was a British barrister and colonial judge who served as Chief Justice of British Honduras and of the Leeward Islands.

== Early life and education ==
Maxwell was born in the Turks and Caicos Islands, at the time a part of the Bahamas.

The son of the Rev. Joseph Maxwell, Vicar of Pennington, Lancashire and Rector of St. Matthew's Anglican Church, Nassau, Bahamas, Maxwell was privately educated, before attending Nassau Grammar School and Balliol College, Oxford, where he took first-class honours in Jurisprudence in 1885.

== Legal career ==
=== Admission ===
He was called to the English bar at Lincoln's Inn in 1884, where he held a first-class studentship in jurisprudence and Roman civil law and a first-class scholarship in equity, and joined the Northern Circuit.

=== British Honduras (present-day Belize) ===
He became Acting Attorney-General of British Honduras in 1890 and Attorney-General in 1896.

From 1907 to 1912, he was Chief Justice of British Honduras. (He had also served as Acting Chief Justice in 1899, 1902, 1904, and 1906.)

He was also for a time Major Commanding, British Honduras Volunteer Force.

=== Leeward Islands ===
In 1912, he became Chief Justice of the Leeward Islands, and retired in 1918. He also revised the laws of the Leeward Islands from 1871 to 1888.

=== Retirement ===
Following his retirement from the bench, he chaired the commission on riots in Belize in 1919.

== Honours ==
Maxwell was created a King's Counsel for British Honduras in 1905 and King's Counsel for the Bahamas in 1920.

Maxwell was knighted by the King in July 1911.

== Personal life ==
In 1882, Maxwell married Adela Drought, daughter of the Rev Adolphus T. Drought, Rector of Cloontuskert, Ireland. They had two sons and a daughter.

== Death ==
Maxwell died in Nice, France, in 1931.
