= National Assembly Building of Belize =

National Assembly Building
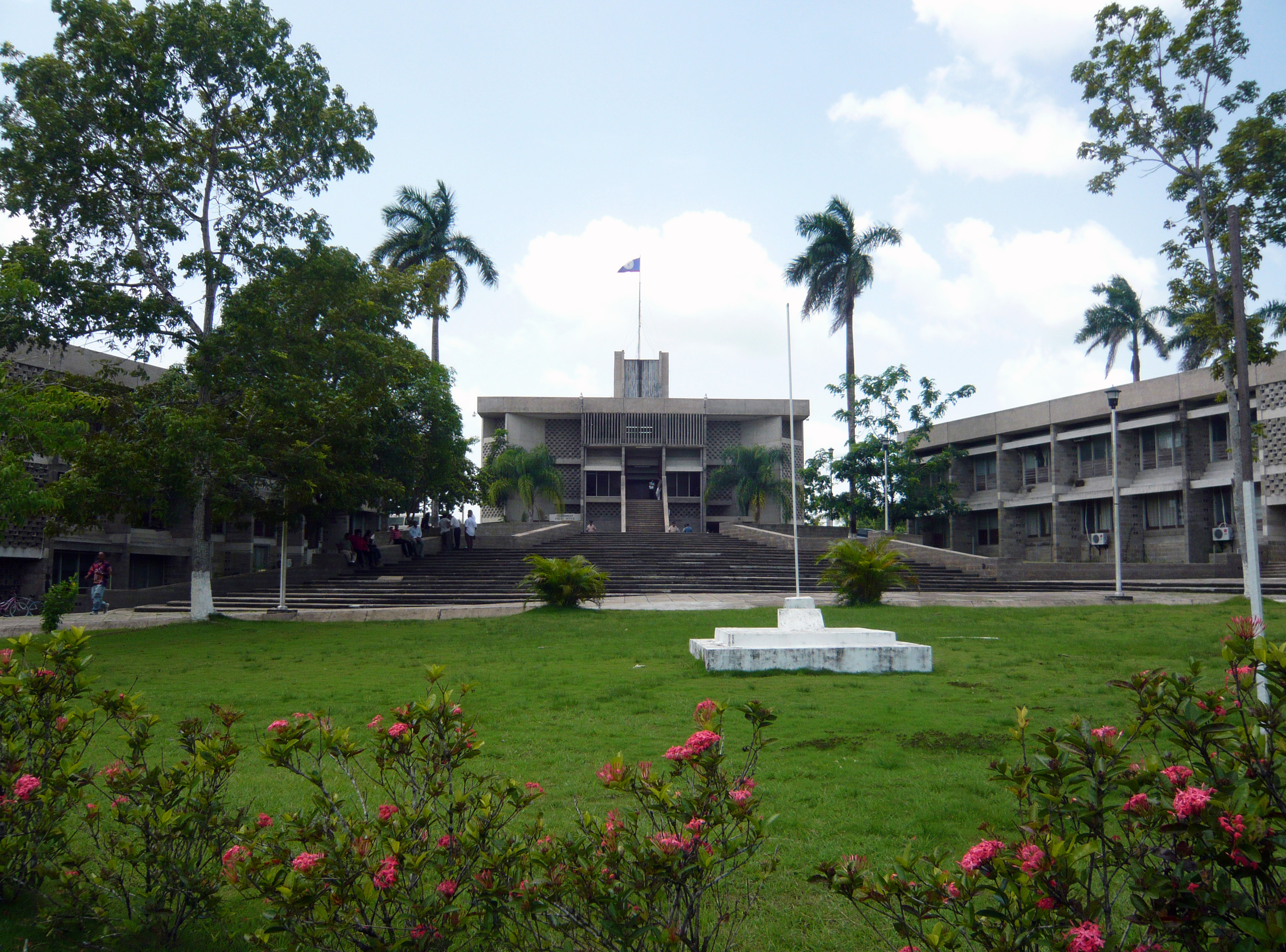
- Belmopan National Assembly Building at Independence Plaza
- Interactive map of the National Assembly Building area

General information
- Architectural style: Pre-Columbian Mayan; Brutalist
- Location: Belmopan, Belize, Belize
- Coordinates: 17.2512°N 88.7730°W
- Completed: 1970; 56 years ago
- Client: National Assembly of Belize
- Owner: Government of Belize

The National Assembly Building of Belize is the home of Belize's two houses of Parliament - the House of Representatives (lower house) and the Senate of Belize (upper house). It is located in Belmopan.

== History ==
Opened on October 9, 1970, the building is within a complex of government buildings at Melhado Parade on Independence Plaza in Belmopan and mimics Pre-Columbian Mayan and Brutalist architectural designs. The Building is flanked by two three storey buildings that houses offices. Prior to the opening of the National Assembly, the Assembly Chamber had been located in Belize City. The Assembly building was inaugurated with a joint sitting of both houses of the legislature on the day of its opening.

Major renovations on the building started in 2024, with a projected cost of $1.9 million dollars (BZD). The project is being financed with a $792,125.30 (USD) grant from the government of the Government of Taiwan. During the renovations, the Legislature relocated to the George Price Centre between August 2024 and September 2024.

== Legislature ==
The National Assembly is responsible for making Belize's laws, and bills must be passes by both houses, and the Governor General. The House of Representatives is formed of 31 members, with the number raised from 29 in 2005, appointed by General Election, and the Senate is formed of 13 members appointed by the Governor General and Prime Minister.

The building opens to the public during parliamentary sessions to allow all to observe the legislative process from the public viewing gallery.

== Gallery ==
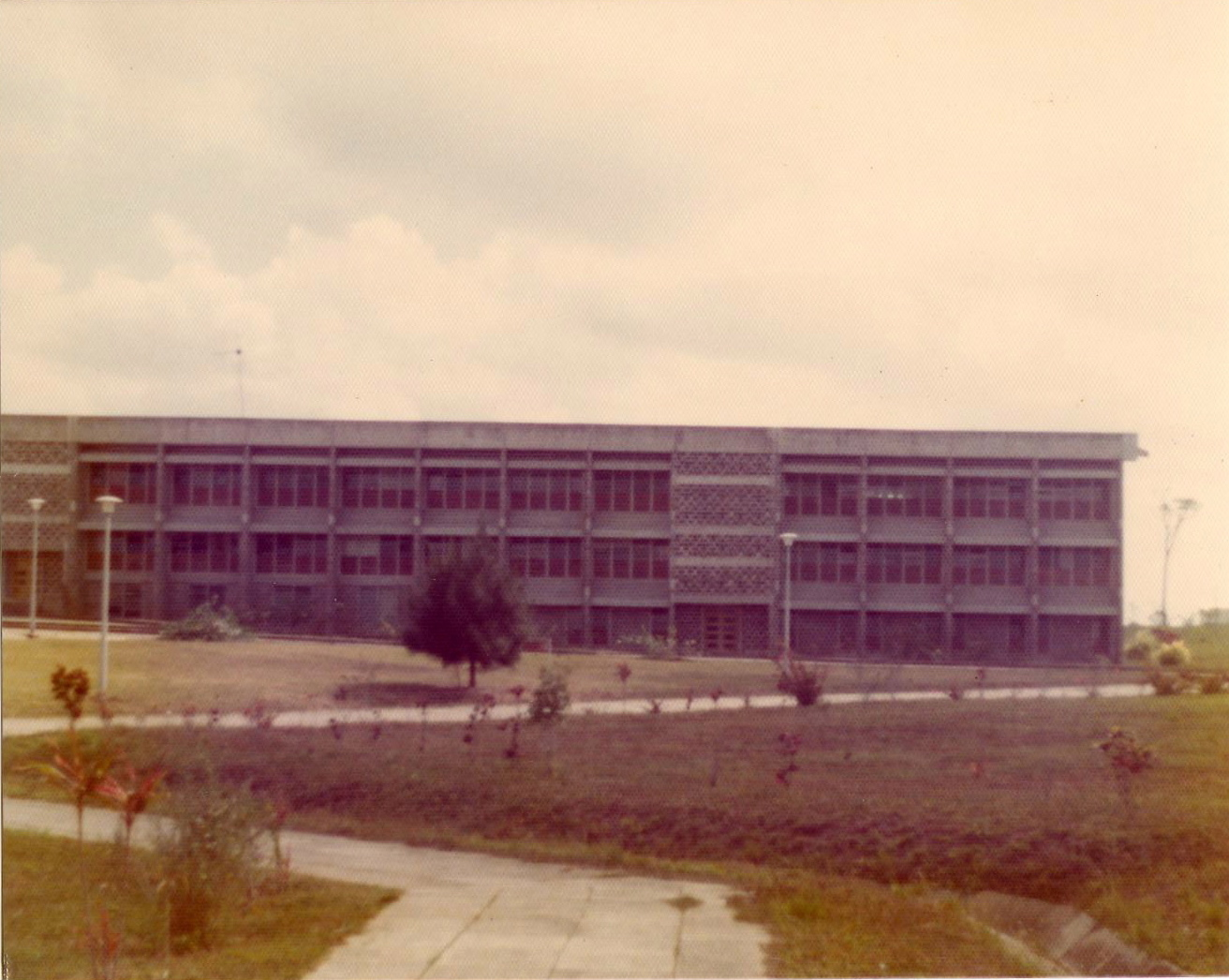
Parliamentary wing

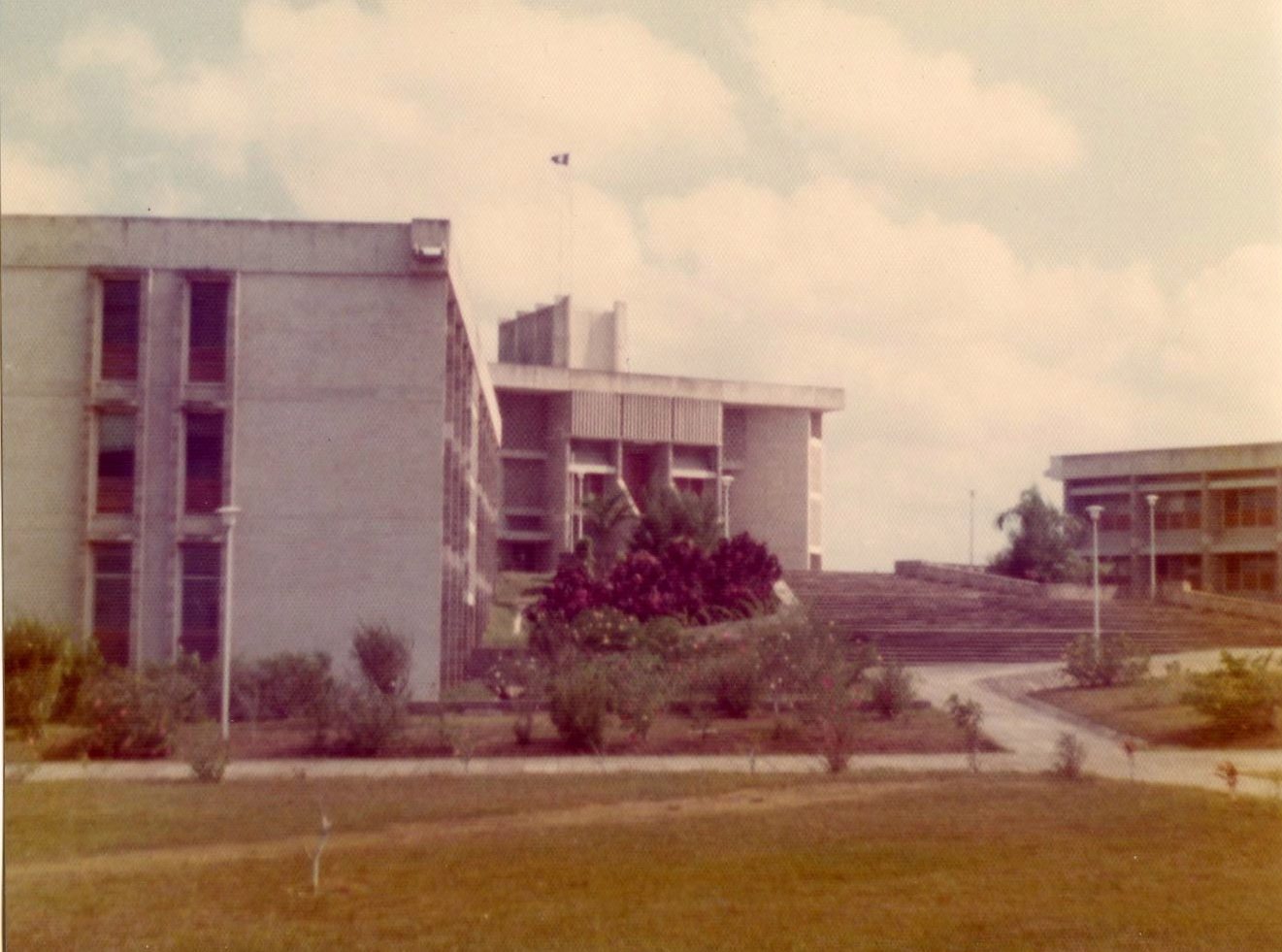
Ministry of Education, Youth and Sports Building (L), National Assembly Building (C), Parliamentary wing (R)
