= List of speakers of the House of Representatives of Belize =

This is a list of speakers of the House of Representatives of Belize.

Name	Entered office	Left office	Notes
Hon. Woldrich Harrison Courtenay	12 March 1965	3 October 1974	
Hon. Sir Alexander Hunter KBE	8 November 1974	27 July 1979	
Hon. Charles Bartlett Hyde	30 November 1979	9 November 1984	
Hon. Carlos Castillo	21 December 1984	31 July 1989	
Hon. Robert Clifton Swift	15 September 1989	1 June 1993	
Hon. Bernard Q. Pitts, SC	16 July 1993	13 July 1998	
Hon. Sylvia Flores	12 September 1998	1 July 2001	
Hon. Elizabeth Zabaneh	3 August 2001	7 January 2008	
Hon. Emil Arguelles	14 March 2008	3 February 2012	
Hon. Michael Peyrefitte	21 March 2012	1 January 2017	
Hon. Laura Tucker-Longsworth	13 January 2017	6 October 2020	
Hon. Valerie Woods	11 December 2020	Incumbent	
