= Rodwell Ferguson =

Belizean politician

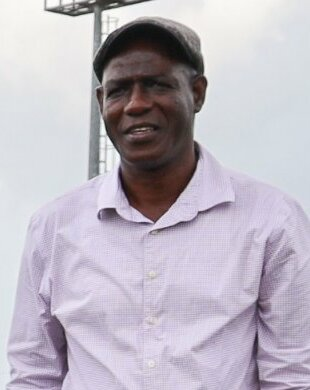

Minister of Youth, Sports, and Transport
- Incumbent
- Assumed office 13 November 2020.
- Prime Minister: Johnny Briceño

Personal details
- Party: People's United Party

Rodwell Ferguson is a Belizean politician and businessman. A member of the People's United Party, he is currently serving as Minister of Youth, Sports, and Transport in the cabinet of Prime Minister Johnny Briceño.

== Education and private sector career ==
Ferguson holds a general certificate in English, Religious Studies and Accounting. He additionally holds advanced diplomas in cost accounting and business management. Ferguson has worked as an accountant and supervisor, and owns and operates a resort hotel in Pomona, Belize.

== Political career ==
Ferguson was elected to represent the constituency of Stann Creek West in the Stann Creek District in the 2003 general election, winning by 584 votes. In 2007, Ferguson replaced Cordel Hyde as Minister of Youth, Sports, & Defense. He lost reelection by 824 votes in 2008.

Ferguson was returned to office in the 2012 election as member for Stann Creek West, winning by 574 votes. He was later reelected by a margin of 8 votes in the 2015 election, and won by 2,391 votes in 2020.

Ferguson serves as the chair of the People's United Party Southern Caucus. He was appointed Minister of Youth, Sports, and Transport in 2020. In 2023, he faced allegations of corruption, which he denied.
