= Michael Peyrefitte =

Belizean politician

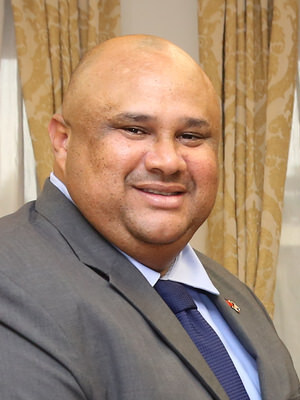
Peyrefitte in 2017

Michael George Peyrefitte is a Belizean attorney and politician.

Peyrefitte studied at UWI Cave Hill. He stood as a UDP candidate in the 2008 election, coming within 16 votes of unseating Francis Fonseca in Freetown.

From 2012 to 2017, Peyrefitte served as Speaker of the House of Representatives of Belize. In 2017, he was appointed Attorney General. He was at the same time appointed as a Senator for the UDP.

In 2020, Peyrefitte was reappointed as a Senator for the UDP.
