= Constitution of Belize =

Supreme law of the nation of Belize

The Constitution of Belize is the supreme law of the nation of Belize. It was signed in September 1981 with effect from that date.

== Structure ==
The Constitution of Belize, Chapter 4 of the Laws of Belize, is divided into a preamble, 13 parts and four schedules. They are set out as below.

=== Preamble ===
According to the Constitution, the people of Belize:

- affirm that the Nation of Belize shall be founded upon principles which acknowledge the supremacy of God, faith in human rights and fundamental freedoms, the position of the family in a society of free men and free institutions, the dignity of the human person and the equal and inalienable rights with which all members of the human family are endowed by their Creator;
- respect the principles of social justice and therefore believe that the operation of the economic system must result in the material resources of the community being so distributed as to subserve the common good, that there should be adequate means of livelihood for all, that labour should not be exploited or forced by economic necessity to operate in inhumane conditions but that there should be opportunity for advancement on the basis of recognition of merit, ability and integrity, that equal protection should be given to children regardless of their social status, and that a just system should be ensured to provide for education and health on the basis of equality;
- believe that the will of the people shall form the basis of government in a democratic society in which the government is freely elected by universal adult suffrage and in which all persons may, to the extent of their capacity, play some part in the institutions of national life and thus develop and maintain due respect for lawfully constituted authority;
- recognise that men and institutions remain free only when freedom is founded upon respect for moral and spiritual values and upon the rule of law;require policies of state which protect and safeguard the unity, freedom, sovereignty and territorial integrity of Belize; which eliminate economic and social privilege and disparity among the citizens of Belize whether by race, ethnicity, colour, creed, disability or sex; which ensures gender equality; which protect the rights and opinions of the individual to life, liberty, basic education, basic health, the right to vote in elections, the right to work and the pursuit of happiness; which protect the identity of one individual, dignity and social and cultural values of Belizeans, including Belize's indigenous peoples; which preserve the right of the individual to the ownership of private property and the right to operate private businesses; which prohibit the exploitation of man by man or by the state; which ensure a just system of social security and welfare; which protect the environment; which promote international peace, security and co-operation among nations, the establishment of a just and equitable international economic and social order in the world with respect for international law and treaty obligations in the dealings among nations;
- desire that their society shall reflect and enjoy the above-mentioned principles, beliefs and needs and that their Constitution should therefore enshrine and make provisions for ensuring the achievement of the same in Belize;

and say that the following shall have effect as the Constitution of Belize.

=== Part 1: The State and the Constitution ===
- What Belize is and its boundaries; Constitution established as supreme law.

Comprises sections 1 and 2.

=== Part 2: Protection of Fundamental Rights and Freedoms ===
Comprises sections 3-22.

- Fundamental rights and freedoms; rights to life, personal liberty, law, inhuman treatment, slavery and forced labour, arbitrary search and entry; freedom of movement, conscience, expression, assembly and association; privacy, work, racial discrimination, deprivation of property. Provisions for public emergencies, protection of detained persons under emergency laws. Enforcement. Existing laws. Interpretation and savings.

=== Part 3: Citizenship ===
Comprises sections 23-29

- Becoming a citizen on Independence day (September 21). Born in Belize on or after. Born outside Belize on or after. Registration. Dual nationality. Legislation. Interpretation.

=== Part 4: The Governor-General ===
Sections 30–35.

- Establishment. Acting Governor-General. Oath. Deputy's functions. Exercise. Information on matters of government.

=== Part 5: The Executive ===
Sections 36–54.

- Executive authority. Prime Minister, Deputy Prime Minister, Performance of functions during absence or illness. Ministers of Government and portfolio allocation. Attorney General. Performance of ministerial functions. Cabinet. Ministers of State. Oath taken by Ministers, etc. Leader of the Opposition. Permanent Secretaries and Cabinet Secretary. Control of public prosecutions. Constitution of offices, etc. Prerogative of mercy. Procedure in capital cases. Belize Advisory Council.

=== Part 6: The Legislature ===
Largest part, covering sections 55–93.

- Establishment, House of Representatives, Senate, Clerks to Houses, Legislative power and alteration of Constitution, Procedure and Oath, Voting, Bills and Quorums, Prorogation and Dissolution, General Elections, Elections and Boundaries Commission, electoral divisions.

=== Part 7: The Judiciary ===
Sections 94–104.

- Establishment of Supreme Court, Court of Appeal. Supreme Court. Court of Appeal. Originally, appeals to Her Majesty in Council; appeals to Privy Council since abolished by Belize Constitution (Seventh Amendment) Bill and replaced with Caribbean Court of Justice.

=== Part 8: The Public Service ===
Sections 105–113.

- Public Services Commission. Appointment of public officers and other civil servants. Discipline. Pensions.
- Gratuity and retirement

=== Part 9: Finance ===
Sections 114–120.

- Consolidated Revenue Fund, Contingencies Fund. Remuneration, public debt and audit.

=== Part 10: Miscellaneous ===
- Sections 121–131.
- Code of Conduct. National Symbols. Appointments. Removal and Resignations. Consultation. National Seal. Interpretation.

=== Part 11: Transitional Provisions ===
Sections 132–140.

- Interpretation of section. Constitution's transitional powers. Existing laws. First Governor General. Ministers, National Assembly, public officers. Courts. Alteration.

=== Part 12: Repeals and Date of Commencement ===
- Sections 141 and 142.

Commencement. Revocations.

=== Part 13: Government Control Over Public Utilities ===
This part was added to the Belize Constitution in 2011, when the government took majority control of Belize Electricity Limited, Belize Water Services Limited, and Belize Telemedia Limited.

143. Interpretation. 144. Majority ownership and control of public utilities. 145. Validity of Acquisition Orders in respect of Belize Electricity Limited and Belize Telemedia Limited.

=== Schedules ===
- 1: Definition of Belize.
- 2: Alteration of Constitution (Section 69).
- 3: Oath of Allegiance and Office
- 4: Revocations.

Belize in the late 1970s was engaged in a territorial dispute with Guatemala. It became increasingly clear that Belize had more international support and a stronger case, hence the talk of independence which had existed since self-government in 1963. Repeated demands by Guatemala and the United Kingdom that Belize cede territory were rejected by Premier George Cadle Price and the ruling People's United Party. By contrast, the newly formed Opposition United Democratic Party wanted the claim settled before proceeding to Independence. In the general elections of 1979, the PUP won and the seeds of the Constitution would begin to fall into place.

In 1980, the United Nations and Organization of American States both called for Belize's independence by the end of 1981.

January 31, 1981 saw a White Paper issued by the Government that began discussions on the proposed Independence Constitution. Despite March's hostile reception of the Heads of Agreement, a Constitutional Conference was held in April and by July the details were approved by the reigning monarch, paving the way for an Order of Independence to be issued by July 31 and debated in Parliament by August 10. Belize became independent on September 21, with the Constitution going into effect as of that date.

== Amendments ==
The constitution of Belize has been amended several times since its ratification in 1981. It was first amended in 1985 to make changes to Belize's citizenship requirements. The most notable of these changes was the removal of a prohibition against multiple citizenship and the introduction of an "economic citizenship" provision granting citizenship to "any person who makes a substantial contribution to the economy and/or well being of Belize". This later provision was criticized for allowing the sale of Belizean passports to foreigners who had never resided in Belize, and was repealed in 2001.

In 2010, the Constitution was amended to make the Caribbean Court of Justice the highest court of appeals in Belize, replacing the Privy Council.
