= Supreme Court of Belize =

Belize superior court

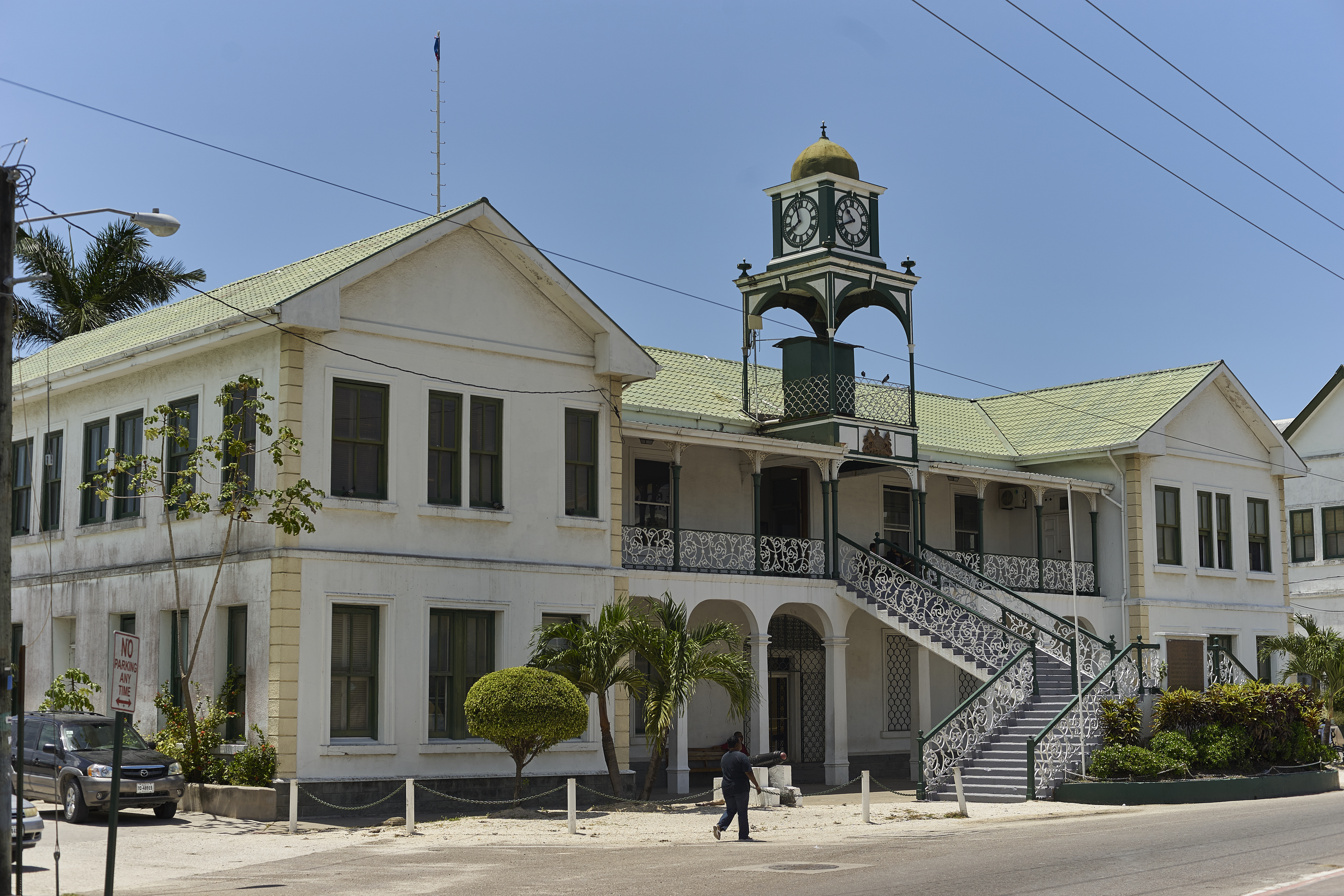
- Supreme Court of Belize (Belize City).
- 17°29′38″N 88°11′11″W
- Jurisdiction: Belize
- Location: Corozal Town; Belize City; Dangriga
- Coordinates: 17°29′38″N 88°11′11″W
- Composition method: Executive selection
- Authorised by: Constitution of Belize
- Judge term length: Until age 65, but may be reappointed

Chief Justice of Belize
- Currently: Louise Blenman
- Since: 2 September 2022

The Supreme Court of Judicature of Belize is one of three types of courts in Belize, the lower ones being the Magistrate's Courts and the Court of Appeal. It is a court of original jurisdiction in both civil and criminal cases as well as an appellate court. It is governed by the Supreme Court of Judicature Act (SCJA).

== Structure ==
The Supreme Court consists of three judges. Under Chapter 7 of the Constitution of Belize, the Chief Justice is appointed by the Governor-General on the advice of the Prime Minister. The PM directly appoints the other two judges, known as Puisne Justices. The Supreme Court has had Chief Justices not only from Belize and other Caribbean countries, but from as far afield as Sierra Leone (Abdulai Conteh), Uganda (Samuel Awich, acting) and Palestine (Taufik Cotran).

Section 40 of the SCJA divides Belize into three districts for judicial purposes, each consisting of two political districts. Section 46 names the place where the Supreme Court shall sit in each district. The districts are:

- The Northern District, comprising Corozal District and Orange Walk District; the Supreme Court sits at the Court House in Orange Walk Town
- The Central District, comprising Belize District and Cayo District; the Supreme Court sits at the Court House in Belize City and in Belmopan City.
- The Southern District, comprising Stann Creek District and Toledo District; the Supreme Court sits at the Court House in Dangriga Town and Punta Gorda Town.

The Supreme Court holds four sessions per year in each of the three districts, for a total of twelve sessions.

The court of last resort was formerly the Judicial Committee of the Privy Council in the United Kingdom; however, Belize adopted the Caribbean Court of Justice in Trinidad and Tobago as its court of final appeal in 2010.

== Buildings ==
Belize's first courthouse was designed by Gustav Von Ohlafen and built in 1818. The first sitting of the Supreme Court was held therein. An entirely wooden structure, it was destroyed by fire on 17 August 1918; then Governor-General William Hart-Bennett, who had come to render aid in extinguishing the fire, was hit by a flagpole and died of his injuries a few days later. A new reinforced concrete court house was built in 1926 in Belize City. The court also has buildings in other locations outside of Belize City namely, in the Southern Districts Dangriga Town and Punta Gorda Town, The Northern Districts Orange Walk Town and Corozal Town and in Belmopan City in the Cayo District.

== See also ==
- Chief Justice of Belize
