= National Assembly (Belize) =

Bicameral legislature of Belize

Coordinates: 17.2512°N 88.7730°W

Type
- Type: Bicameral
- Houses: Senate (upper house); House of Representatives (lower house)

Leadership
- President of the Senate: Hon. Carolyn Trench Sandiford since 11 December 2020
- Speaker of the House of Representatives: Hon. Valerie Woods since 11 December 2020

Structure
- Seats: 44 members 31 representatives 13 senators
- Senate political groups: PUP (6); UDP (3); Other (4)
- House of Representatives political groups: PUP (26); UDP (5)

Elections
- Senate voting system: Appointed by the Governor-General
- House of Representatives voting system: First-past-the-post

Meeting place
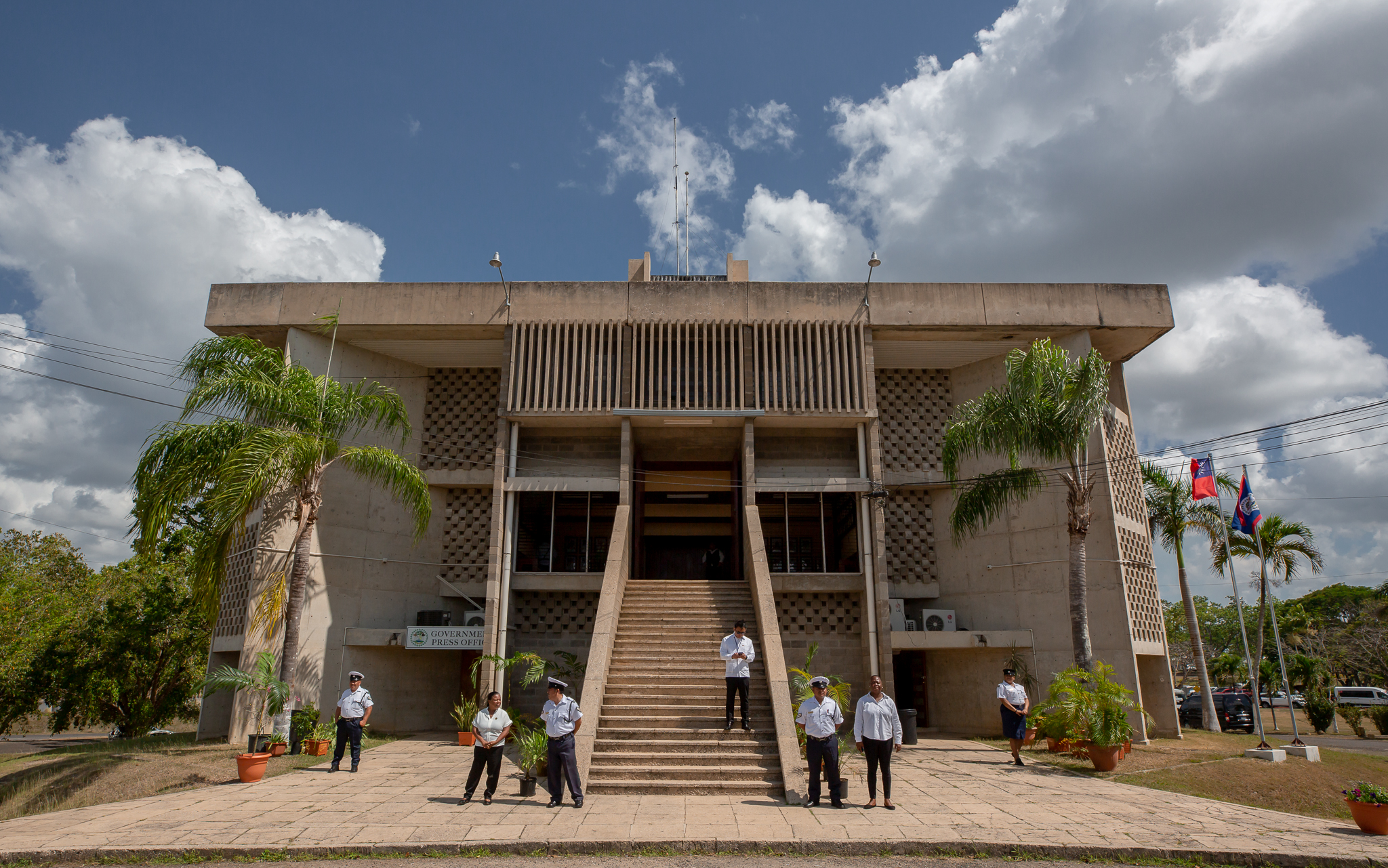
- National Assembly Building, Belmopan
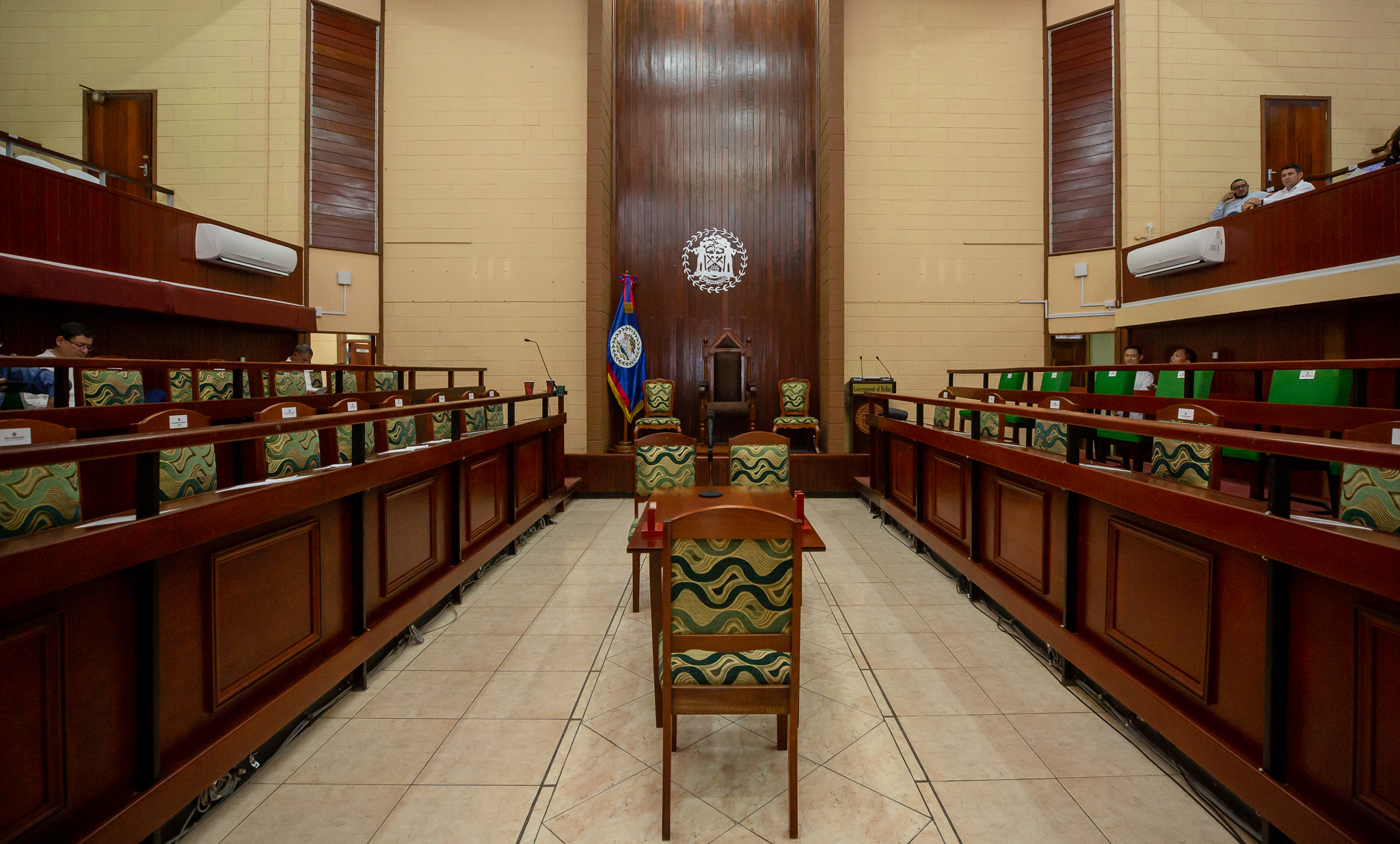

Website
- www.nationalassembly.gov.bz

The National Assembly is the bicameral legislature of the nation of Belize. It is divided into the House of Representatives, with 31 members, elected by universal suffrage, and the Senate, with 13 members, appointed by the Governor-General in consultation with the Prime Minister and the Leader of the Opposition. The presiding officer of the House is the Speaker, while the Senate is presided over by the President.

== History ==
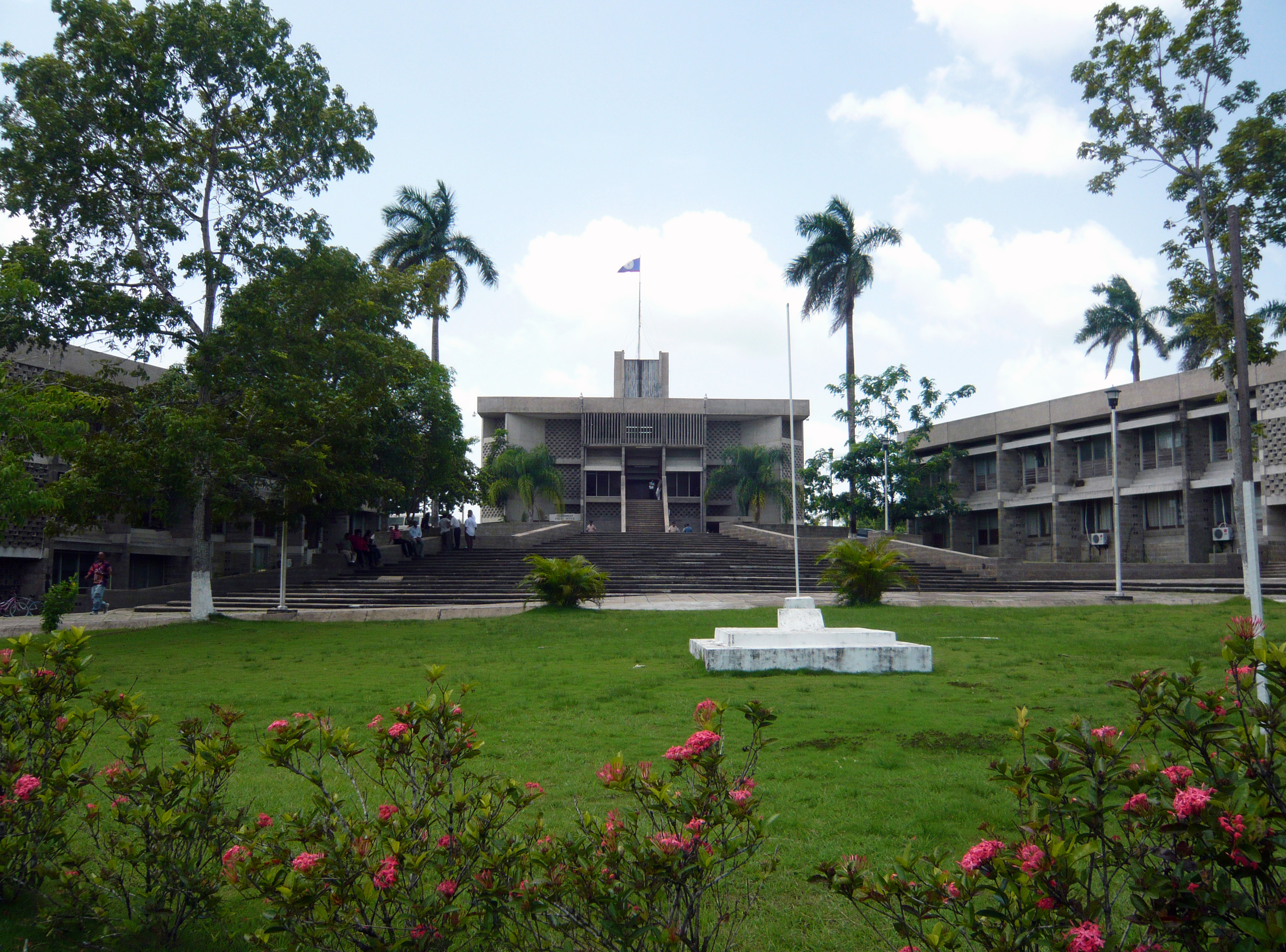
Belmopan National Assembly Building at Independence Plaza

The National Assembly of Belize, known as British Honduras prior to independence in 1981, was first introduced on 31 December 1963, replacing the unicameral Legislative Assembly.

The National Assembly has the power to debate and create laws based on the Constitution. It typically meets, both House and Senate, once a month, with other meetings called as necessary.

Since 1970, following the relocation of the capital to Belmopan, the Parliament has sat at National Assembly Building, Belmopan in the Cayo District.

== House of Representatives ==
The House of Representatives is the Lower House. It consists of 31 members, who are elected by the people in a general election every five years. Each member represents one constituency. Members of the House include both members of the ruling party and members of the opposition who won their seats in general election. The House of Representatives is presided over during their meetings by a speaker. The speaker's main responsibility is to maintain order and control. The House of Representatives passes bills, debates national issues and approves government budget.

== Senate ==
The Senate is the Upper House. The Senate discusses and confirms bills that are sent from the House of Representatives. It is made up of 13 members who are all appointed by the Governor General. The President of the Senate presides over meetings.

- 6 senators are appointed on the advice of the Prime Minister
- 3 senators are appointed on the advice of the Leader of the Opposition
- 1 is appointed on the advice of the Belize Chamber of Commerce and the Belize Business Bureau
- 1 is appointed on the advice of the Belize Council of Churches
- 1 is appointed on the advice of the Belize National Trade and Union Congress
- 1 is appointed on the advice of the Non-Government Organizations (NGO)

== Lawmaking process ==
The lawmaking process includes the following steps:

1. Cabinet accepts an idea from a minister and discuss it. Legal draftsmen draft the bill.
2. Approval of the bill by Cabinet.
3. The Bill is introduced into the House of Representatives for the 1st Reading.
4. House committee meetings to hear public opinions and possible changes to the bill.
5. The bill is debated in the House of Representatives. ( 2nd Reading)
6. The bill is accepted and voted upon ( 3rd Reading) if it is passed by a majority votes it becomes an act.
7. The act goes through the same three stages/ readings in the Senate before it becomes a law.
8. Once the act passes the Senate, it is sent to the Governor General for his signature. The act becomes a law.

== Trivia ==
The house currently has only one debating chamber despite being a bicameral legislature.

The National Assembly and the Senate meet at different times for this reason.

== See also ==
- Politics of Belize
- List of legislatures by country
- Prime Minister of Belize
- Governor-General of Belize
