= Senate (Belize) =

Upper house of the National Assembly of Belize

Coordinates: 17.2512°N 88.7730°W

Senate of Belize

Type
- Type: Upper house of the National Assembly of Belize
- Term limits: 5 year term, appointed by the Governor-General of Belize

History
- Founded: September 21, 1981

Leadership
- President: Hon. Carolyn Trench Sandiford since 11 December 2020
- Vice-President: Hon. Collet Montejo, PUP since 11 December 2020
- Leader of Government Business: Hon. Eamon Courtenay, PUP since 11 December 2020
- Leader of the Opposition: Hon. Michael Peyrefitte, UDP since 11 December 2020

Structure
- Seats: 13 members
- Political groups: PUP 6 UDP 3 Other 4

Elections
- Voting system: Appointment by the Governor-General

Meeting place
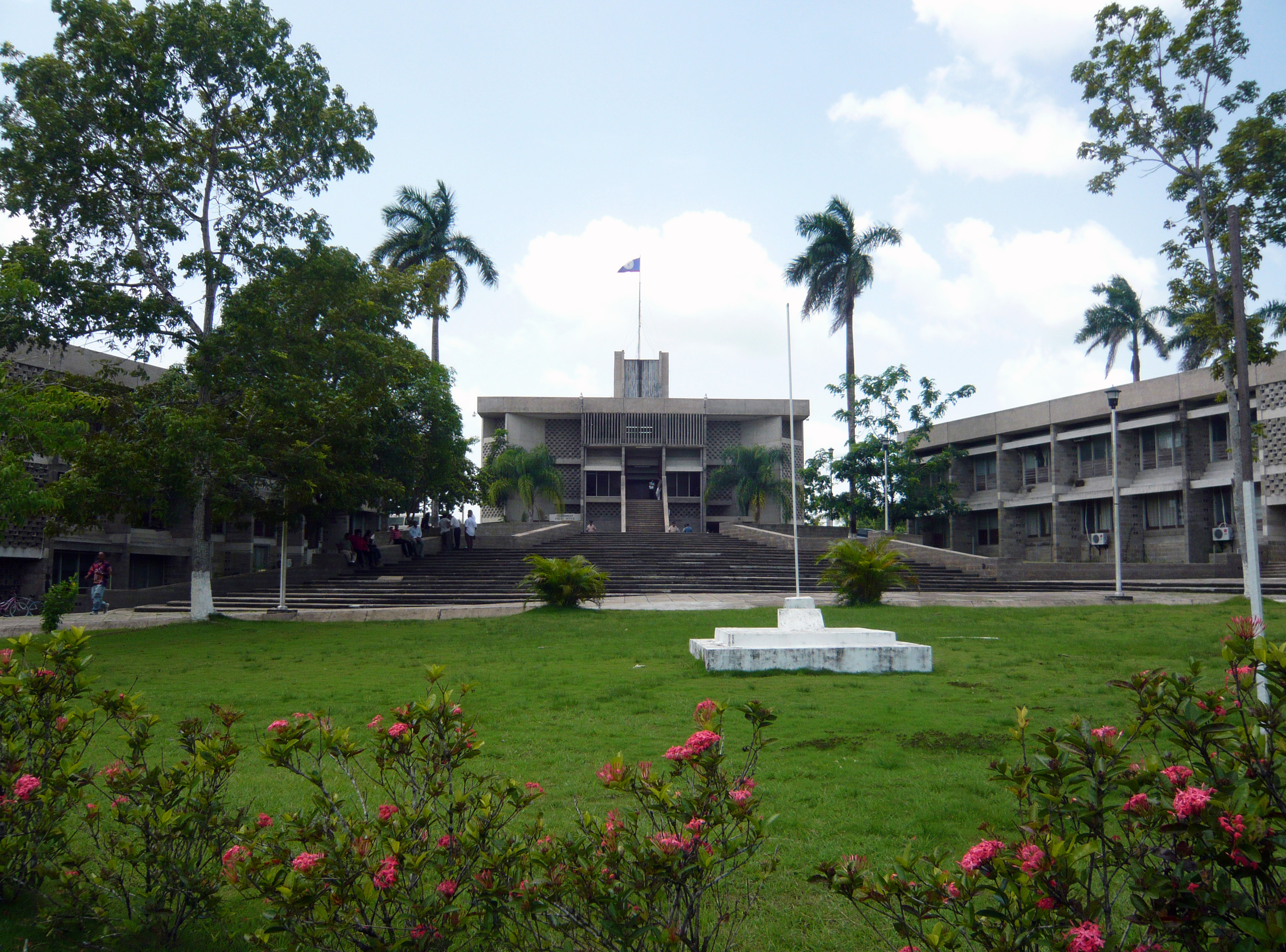
- National Assembly Building; Independence Hill; Belmopan; Belize

Website
- National Assembly of Belize

Constitution
- Constitution of Belize

The Senate is the upper chamber of the National Assembly of Belize. It has 13 members appointed for a five-year term by the Governor-General.

== Establishment and appointment ==
Senators are appointed by the Governor-General in the following manners:

- 6 with the advice of the prime minister
- 3 with the advice of leader of the opposition
- 1 each with the advice of the following organizations jointly:
  - the Belize Council of Churches and Evangelical Association of Churches
  - the Belize Chamber of Commerce and Industry and the Belize Business Bureau
  - the National Trade Union Congress of Belize and the Civil Society Steering Committee
  - non-governmental organizations (NGOs) in good standing

In practice, the party that wins the general election (by capturing the most seats in the lower house of representatives) also controls the Senate. In previous incarnations, eight senators were appointed, five by the prime minister, two by the leader of the opposition and one by the governor general and the Belize Advisory Council. One more senator was given to the opposition beginning in the 1990s.

== Requirements for appointment ==
- Minimum age: 21 years
- Citizenship: Belizean citizenship
- Residence: in Belize for at least a year prior to nomination
- Who cannot be senators: members of the House, members of the armed and police forces, persons contracted to work for the Government.

=== Appointments to Cabinet ===
Occasionally, a prime minister may find it necessary to appoint a senator to a post in the Cabinet. The first such instance was for C.L.B. Rogers under George Price in 1979 after losing his seat in the House. Price also appointed Ralph Fonseca, who did not run in the 1989 general election, to a minister of state post until he ran and won in a newly created constituency in 1993.

In 1997, the UDP appointed the Belizean ambassador to Mexico, Alfredo "Fred" Martinez, a senator to also serve in Cabinet as minister of trade and industry, thereby relinquishing his ambassadorial appointment, to which he would later return.

Former Senator Richard "Dickie" Bradley twice lost elections to the House and was appointed a senator and given a Cabinet post each time.

Following the 2012 general elections, the UDP lost its supermajority and exercised its constitutional limit to appointing four senators to serve as ministers. One, Godwin Hulse, had been a senator dating back to 2006 and was appointed leader of government business in the House, while three others were newcomers to national administration (Charles Gibson is a former senior public officer and was CEO under John Saldivar in the Ministry of the Public Service; he was appointed as minister for that portfolio in 2012.)

== Meetings and duties ==
The Senate traditionally meets in session in the week immediately following a House meeting. Senators will discuss the measures sent by the House for review and approval, then vote on whether they should be sent back or approved.

Beginning in late 2005, the Senate convened an investigation into allegations of mismanagement of public funds at the Social Security Board. This committee was headed by Senator Godwin Hulse and featured senators Dickie Bradley, Moises Chan, and Rene Gomez. Arthur Roches was also supposed to appear as the UDP representative, but declined under pressure from the Opposition. These senators questioned persons working at the Board in the last five years over the activities of the Board.

In June 2006, the Senate released a report in which it roundly condemned the actions of General Manager Narda Garcia and Chairman Yasin Shoman in presiding over the questionable investment of millions of dollars in failed projects of former House member Glenn Godfrey. It called for their removal and reforms to be made to the laws governing Social Security. Shoman and Garcia denied any wrongdoing, but both had been removed from the Board, Garcia choosing to challenge this in court.

On October 28, 2006, Chief Justice Abdulai Conteh denied Garcia judicial review, claiming the Senate had no case to answer. Garcia has settled out of court with the Social Security board over her contract, receiving an additional eighty thousand Belizean dollars.

Following an appeal of the decision, on November 16, 2006, Conteh denied Garcia leave to appeal the previous decision. Garcia could appeal to Belize's Court of Appeal.

== Officers ==
The Senate elects both a president and vice-president of the Senate upon first convening after a general election. The person elected president may be a senator (provided they do not concurrently hold a ministerial position) or a person external to the Senate. The vice-president must be a member of the Senate who does not hold a ministerial portfolio. (Constitution, Art. 66)

== Current senators ==
(as of November 12, 2020)

- Hon. Carolyn Trench Sandiford President
- Hon. Linsford Castillo, PUP Vice-President
- Hon. Eamon Courtenay, PUP
- Hon.Brittney Galvez, PUP
- Hon.Christopher Coye, PUP
- Hon.Rozel Arana, PUP
- Hon.Hector Guerra, PUP
- Hon.Patrick Faber, UDP
- Hon.Gabriel Zetina, UDP
- Hon.Sheena Pitts, UDP
- Hon.Kevin Herrera, Independent (Business)
- Hon.Glenfield Dennison, Independent (Labour/Unions)
- Hon.Pastor Louis Wade, Independent (Religious)
- Hon.Janelle Chanona, Independent (NGOs/Civil Society)

== Recent history ==
Senators occasionally use their position as a springboard for election to the lower house which really wields much of the legislature's power. Most senators who do go on to contest elections usually have the backing of their party establishment.

In October 2006, three new senators, Esther Ayuso Ramirez, Deborah Mencias-McMillan and Diego Bol were appointed on the advice of the leader of the opposition to replace outgoing Senators Marcel Cardona, Ambrose Tillett and Arthur Roches. This frees Roches and Cardona to run for House seats in 2008.

In June 2007, as a result of an Executive reshuffle, Eamon Courtenay was removed as a senator. He was replaced by Ambassador to the United States and OAS, Lisa Shoman (ironically, they were both respectively informed of their demotion and promotion by phone while participating in a meeting in Panama.) Courtenay and Minister of Natural Resources John Briceno were fired on Monday June 4.

September 2007 brought more upheaval to the Senate. Channel 5 reported that Anthony Chanona resigned over disagreements with a recent bill argued before the Senate. His replacement, David Hoy, was named in November.

The 2008 Belizean constitutional referendum saw a majority of those voting support an elected senate but on a much lower turnout than in the simultaneous general election; the newly elected UDP government decided not to implement the reform.

Following the 2012 elections, Collet Montejo and Karen Boden joined the long-standing Shoman, but were shunted out in 2014 in favour of Andrews and Sylvestre. Montejo, Andrews and Sylvestre were expected to run for seats in the next general election.

== See also ==
- List of presidents of the Senate of Belize
