= House of Representatives (Belize) =

Lower house of the National Assembly of Belize

Coordinates: 17.2511°N 88.7731°W

Type
- Type: Lower house

Leadership
- Speaker: Valerie Woods, PUP since December 11, 2020
- Prime Minister: Johnny Briceño, PUP since November 12, 2020
- Leader of the Opposition: Tracy Panton, UDP since March 14, 2025

Structure
- Seats: 31
- Political groups: HM Government: People's United Party (26); HM Most Loyal Opposition: United Democratic Party (5)

Elections
- First election: 30 October 1974
- Last election: 12 March 2025

Meeting place
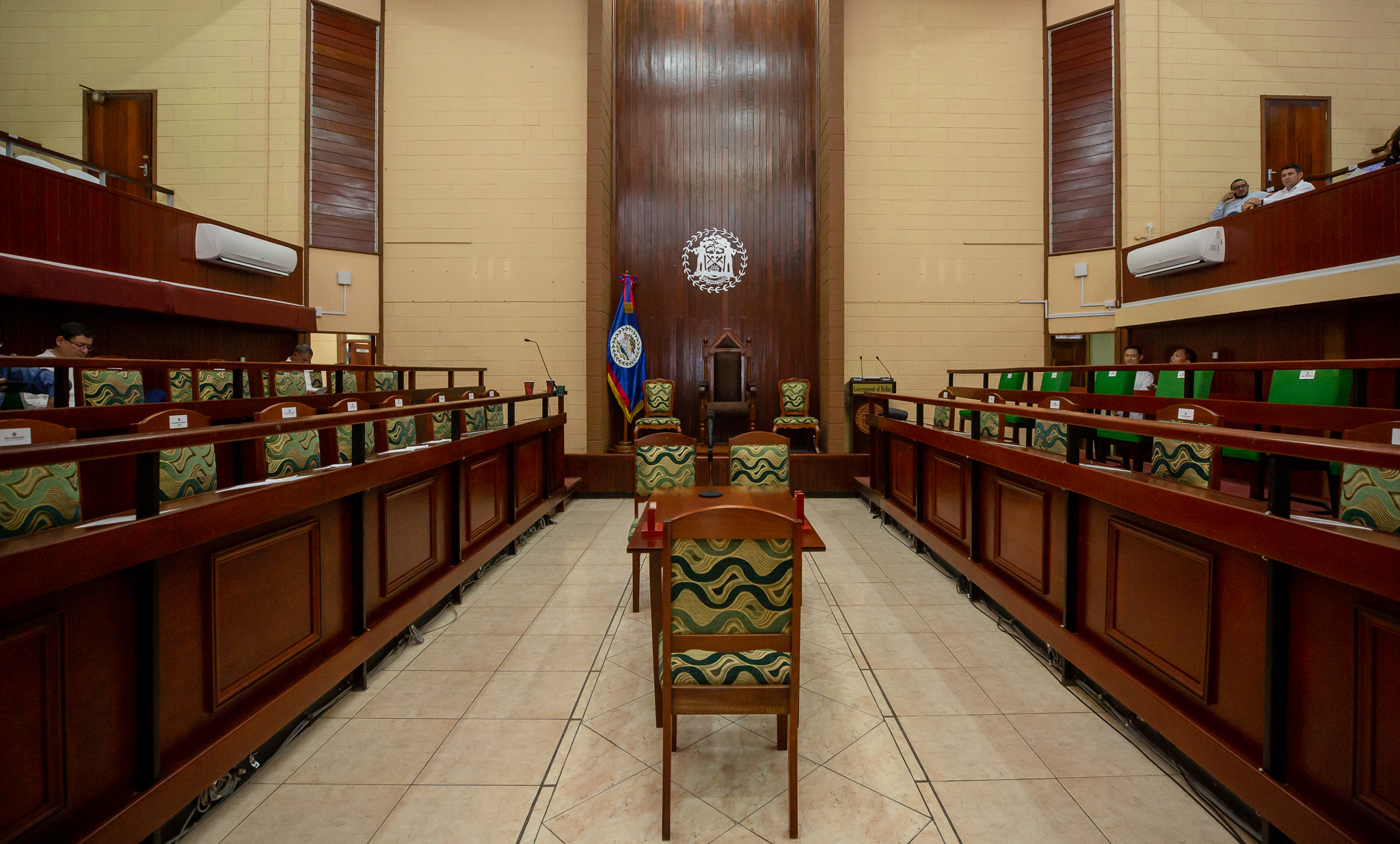
- National Assembly Building of Belize; Independence Hill; Belmopan; Belize

Website
- National Assembly of Belize

The House of Representatives of Belize is the lower chamber of the National Assembly, the other being the Senate. It was created under the 1981 constitution. Members are commonly called "Area Representatives".

Area Representatives are elected by winning a majority of votes in their respective constituencies under the first-past-the-post system. The body is directly descended from the British Honduras Legislative Assembly created in 1954 with nine elected members. It has been expanded several times since: to 18 in 1961, 28 in 1984, 29 in 1993 and finally to 31 in 2008. The leader of the majority party in the Belize House typically becomes Prime Minister of Belize.

== Current members of the House of Representatives by district ==
The elected representatives and their constituencies according to the Elections and Boundaries Department are:

Belize District

- Caribbean Shores: Kareem Musa (PUP)
- Freetown: Francis Fonseca (PUP)
- Pickstock: Anthony Mahler (PUP)
- Fort George: Henry Charles Usher (PUP)
- Lake Independence: Cordel Hyde (PUP)
- Albert: Tracy Panton (UDP), Leader of the opposition
- Collet: Devin Daly (PUP)
- Mesopotamia: Lee Mark Chang (UDP)
- Queen's Square: Godwin Haylock (UDP)
- Port Loyola: Gilroy Usher Sr. (PUP)
- Belize Rural North: Marconi Prince Leal (PUP)
- Belize Rural South: Abner ‘Andre’ Perez (PUP)
- Belize Rural Central: Dolores Balderamos-Garcia (PUP)

Orange Walk District

- Orange Walk North: Ramon "Monchi" Cervantes (PUP)
- Orange Walk Central: Juan "Johnny" Antonio Briceño (PUP), Prime Minister
- Orange Walk East: Kevin Bernard (PUP)
- Orange Walk South: Jose Abelardo Mai (PUP)

Cayo District

- Cayo North: Michel Chebat (PUP)
- Cayo South: Julius Espat (PUP)
- Cayo West: Miguel "Mike" Guerra (UDP)
- Cayo Central: Luis ‘Alex’ Balona (PUP)
- Cayo North East: Orlando Habet (PUP)
- Belmopan: Oscar Mira (PUP)

Corozal District

- Corozal North: Hugo Patt (UDP)
- Corozal South West: Ramiro Ramirez (PUP)
- Corozal Bay: Thea Garcia-Ramirez (PUP)
- Corozal South: Florencio Marin Jr. (PUP)

Stann Creek District

- Dangriga: Dr. Louis Zabaneh (PUP)
- Stann Creek West: Rodwell Ferguson (PUP)

Toledo District

- Toledo West: Oscar Requena (PUP)
- Toledo East: Osmond Martinez (PUP)

== Elections ==
=== Next election ===
According to Section 84 of the Constitution of Belize, the National Assembly must be dissolved "five years from the date when the two Houses of the former National Assembly first met" unless dissolved sooner by the Governor-General of Belize upon the advice of the prime minister. and the election held within three months of the dissolution. The current parliament first met on Friday 13 November 2020, so the next election must be held no later than 13 February 2026.

=== Past elections ===
The most recent general election to the House of Representatives, held on 11 November 2020, was the 16th since 1954 when universal literate adult suffrage was introduced, and the 8th since independence from the United Kingdom in 1981. The People's United Party led by Johnny Briceño entered Government for the first time last winning in 2003. It won 26 seats, while the United Democratic Party won only 5 seats.

== See also ==
- List of speakers of the House of Representatives of Belize
