= 2008 Belizean constitutional referendum =

- 7 February 2008
- Should the Senate of Belize be elected?
- Outcome: Proposal not implemented due to low voter turnout.

Results
Choice	Votes	%
Yes	45,057	62.71%
No	26,793	37.29%
Valid votes	71,850	98.14%
Invalid or blank votes	1,363	1.86%
Total votes	73,213	100.00%
Registered voters/turnout	156,993	46.63%

A constitutional referendum, the nation's first, was held in Belize on 7 February 2008, coinciding with the 2008 general elections.

The question asked was: "Should the Senate of Belize be elected?"

While approved by 61% of voters with a 46% turnout, the referendum was only consultative, and the government chose not to implement the result, considering the low turnout.

== Background ==
Ever since independence from the United Kingdom in 1981, Belize has had its upper house appointed. Currently, there are 12 senators and a president.

An elected Senate, according to its proponents, would return the decision over control of the nation's resources and development to the Belizean people.

== Discussion ==
Earlier in the year, Prime Minister Said Musa had given tacit support to the idea of an elected Senate, and eventually brought up the matter in session of the House of Representatives on December 19, 2007.

Musa introduced a bill to allow for a referendum, to be held in 2008 likely alongside the general elections, to determine Belizeans' thoughts on the issue. The Opposition, led by Dean Barrow, argued against going to a referendum on the basis that Belizeans had not been given enough time for discussion of the issue and charged that the governing People's United Party was trying to hijack the issue to gain votes at the general elections due in the first half of 2008. The PUP countered that the opposition United Democratic Party were on "the wrong side of history".

== Announcement of referendum and reaction ==
Prime Minister of Belize Said Musa, on Monday January 7, 2008, announced that he had asked the Governor General, Sir Colville Young, to issue a writ of referendum to be held the same day as the general election. There is precedent for multiple voting in Belize: the 2003 elections for general and municipal were held on the same day. In anticipation of the announcement the PUP had released ads condemning the UDP position and encouraging Belizeans to vote for them as well as to vote in favour of an elected Senate, linking the two together. The PUP released its proposal for an elected Senate on January 17.

The Opposition UDP announced on January 8 that it had asked its supporters to either boycott the poll or vote "no". It trumpeted its alternate plan as a solution. Party leader Barrow amended the position later on by simply asking supporters to vote "no."

Reaction from the third parties was mixed. Even as many welcome the referendum, they are cautious about mixing it with the general election. Senator Godwin Hulse, Kevin Herrera and Henry Gordon of SPEAR have presented an alternate plan for the elected Senate as part of a list of reforms, to widespread discussion.

== Procedure ==
The referendum was held to the same procedures as a general election. All registered voters over 18 were eligible to participate. Separate places in the polling stations were provided for the referendum.

The voting for the referendum began at 7:00 AM CST (1300 UTC) on election day and finished at 6:00 PM CST (0000 UTC Friday). Counting of votes began at the various counting stations beginning after the counting of votes for the general elections and continuing until a simple majority was reached which declared support or dissent for the question.

== Results ==
Map of the referendum results by constituency, showing where the majority voted yes (shaded in green), and where the majority voted no (shaded in red).

The referendum passed with over 61 percent of the vote nationwide and won in 30 out of 31 constituencies. Only the Queen's Square constituency in Belize City voted against it.

Choice	Votes	%
For	45,057	62.71
Against	26,793	37.29
Total	71,850	100.00
Valid votes	71,850	98.14
Invalid/blank votes	1,363	1.86
Total votes	73,213	100.00
Registered voters/turnout	156,993	46.63
Source: BEBC, Direct Democracy

The 73,213 total votes and 46.6% turnout in the referendum was substantially lower than the 121,168 total votes and 77.2% turnout in the simultaneous general election. The newly elected UDP government had previously opposed the referendum and decided not to implement the reform.

=== By district ===
Division	District	For		Against		Invalid/ blank		Total votes	Registered	Turnout (%)
Division	District	Votes	%	Votes	%	Votes	%	Total votes	Registered	Turnout (%)
Belize	Freetown	1,415	64.23	732	33.23	56	2.54	3,687	2,203	59.75
Belize	Caribbean Shores	1,354	54.25	1,142	45.75	0	0.00	4,564	2,496	54.69
Belize	Pickstock	1,005	60.36	618	37.12	42	2.52	3,294	1,665	50.55
Belize	Fort George	1,393	71.95	503	25.98	40	2.07	3,195	1,936	60.59
Belize	Albert	1,042	67.18	477	30.75	32	2.06	3,242	1,551	47.84
Belize	Queen's Square	699	47.29	779	52.71	0	0.00	3,977	1,478	37.16
Belize	Mesopotamia	619	51.20	565	46.73	25	2.07	3,255	1,209	37.14
Belize	Lake Independence	1,595	61.89	919	35.66	63	2.44	5,155	2,577	49.99
Belize	Collet	1,005	61.96	591	36.44	26	1.60	3,890	1,622	41.70
Belize	Port Loyola	703	52.74	597	44.79	33	2.48	4,106	1,333	32.46
Belize	Belize Rural North	1,349	51.21	1,261	47.87	24	0.91	4,879	2,634	53.99
Belize	Belize Rural Central	1,500	67.54	706	31.79	15	0.68	4,879	2,221	45.52
Belize	Belize Rural South	1,314	68.37	579	30.12	29	1.51	5,470	1,922	35.14
Corozal	Corozal Bay	1,185	71.09	470	28.19	12	0.72	5,352	1,667	31.15
Corozal	Corozal North	1,847	67.29	832	30.31	66	2.40	5,432	2,745	50.53
Corozal	Corozal South East	2,367	69.29	1,002	29.33	47	1.38	5,597	3,416	61.03
Corozal	Corozal South West	1,484	84.32	260	14.77	16	0.91	5,170	1,760	34.04
Orange Walk	Orange Walk Central	2,323	60.26	1,490	38.65	42	1.09	5,982	3,855	64.44
Orange Walk	Orange Walk North	1,317	70.47	523	27.98	29	1.55	6,365	1,869	29.36
Orange Walk	Orange Walk East	1,983	60.02	1,271	38.47	50	1.51	5,767	3,304	57.29
Orange Walk	Orange Walk South	1,852	74.80	565	22.82	59	2.38	5,989	2,476	41.34
Cayo	Cayo North	1,504	55.42	1,168	43.04	42	1.55	5,213	2,714	52.06
Cayo	Cayo Central	1,624	51.65	1,424	45.29	96	3.05	6,316	3,144	49.78
Cayo	Cayo West	1,866	69.89	729	27.30	75	2.81	5,621	2,670	47.50
Cayo	Cayo South	1,466	59.86	889	36.30	94	3.84	5,871	2,449	41.71
Cayo	Cayo North East	1,513	53.71	1,207	42.85	97	3.44	5,363	2,817	52.53
Cayo	Belmopan	1,579	58.79	1,051	39.13	56	2.08	6,060	2,686	44.32
Stann Creek	Dangriga	1,421	53.08	1,233	46.06	23	0.86	5,363	2,677	49.92
Stann Creek	Stann Creek West	2,382	58.23	1,615	39.48	94	2.30	7,085	4,091	57.74
Toledo	Toledo East	1,423	70.24	603	29.76	0	0.00	5,773	2,026	35.09
Toledo	Toledo West	928	76.57	260	21.45	24	1.98	5,608	1,212	21.61

Source: Belize Elections and Boundaries Commission
