= Fred Hunter (Belize politician) =

Belizean politician

Member of the Belize House of Representatives for Belize Rural North
- In office 1961–1984
- Preceded by: Constituency established
- Succeeded by: Sam Rhaburn

Personal details
- Born: December 23, 1927
- Died: December 19, 2020
- Political party: People's United Party

Frederick Hopkins “Fred” Hunter Sr. or Papi Freddy (1927–2020) was a Belizean politician. He represented the Belize Rural North constituency in the Belize House from its creation in 1961 to 1984, when he was defeated by UDP politician Sam Rhaburn. He also served many ministerial posts, being Deputy Minister of the Ministry of Public Works, the Minister of Agriculture, Lands, and Cooperatives, the Minister of Communications, and the Minister of Works, Port, and Harbour.

== Early life ==
In his youth, Hunter was a boxer and competed in Golden Gloves, a boxing competition

== Career ==
Hunter was elected in 1961, 1965, 1969, 1974, and 1979. He lost in the 1984 election. He came back to politics and ran as an independent in the 2012 election but lost.
