= Belize Rural North =

- Constituency for the Belize House of Representatives
- District: Belize
- Electorate: 5,937 (2015)
- Major settlements: Maskall, Lucky Strike

Current constituency
- Created: 1961
- Party: People's United Party
- Area Representative: Marconi Leal

Belize Rural North is an electoral constituency in the Belize District represented in the House of Representatives of the National Assembly of Belize since 2025 by Marconi Leal Jr of the People's United Party.

== Profile ==
The Belize Rural North constituency was created for the 1961 general election as part of a major nationwide redistricting. Out of the 13 Belize District constituencies it is one of three located outside the Belize City limits, consisting of the northern half of the Belize District mainland. Altun Ha, a major Mayan ruin, is located in the constituency.

== Area representatives ==
Election	Area representative	Party
1961	Fred Hunter	PUP
1965	Fred Hunter	PUP
1969	Fred Hunter	PUP
1974	Fred Hunter	PUP
1979	Fred Hunter	PUP
1984	Sam Rhaburn	UDP
1989	Sam Rhaburn	UDP
1993	Maxwell Samuels	PUP
1998	Maxwell Samuels	PUP
2003	Maxwell Samuels	PUP
2008	Edmond Castro	UDP
2012	Edmond Castro	UDP
2015	Edmond Castro	UDP
2020	Marconi Leal Sr	PUP
2025	Marconi Leal Jr	PUP

== Elections ==
Election	Political result	Candidate	Party	Votes	%	±%
2025 general election Electorate: 5,246; Turnout: 3,315 (63.19%) −19.48	PUP hold Majority: 2,600 (87.42%) +78.43	Marconi Leal	PUP	2,898	87.42	+29.41
2025 general election Electorate: 5,246; Turnout: 3,315 (63.19%) −19.48	PUP hold Majority: 2,600 (87.42%) +78.43	Eustace Alden Shaw	UDP	298	8.99	-31.65
2025 general election Electorate: 5,246; Turnout: 3,315 (63.19%) −19.48	PUP hold Majority: 2,600 (87.42%) +78.43	Andrew Reynolds	PNP	56	1.69	-
2020 general election Electorate: 4,721; Turnout: 3,903 (82.67%) +13.61	PUP gain from UDP; Majority: 670 (17.37%) +7.63	Marconi Leal	PUP	2,238	58.01	+14.73
2020 general election Electorate: 4,721; Turnout: 3,903 (82.67%) +13.61	PUP gain from UDP; Majority: 670 (17.37%) +7.63	Edmond Castro	UDP	1,568	40.64	-12.38
2020 general election Electorate: 4,721; Turnout: 3,903 (82.67%) +13.61	PUP gain from UDP; Majority: 670 (17.37%) +7.63	Sean Nicholas	BPP	119	2.90	-
2015 general election Electorate: 5,937; Turnout: 4,100 (69.06%) −0.54	UDP hold Majority: 400 (9.74%) −3.96	Edmond Castro	UDP	2,174	53.02	−2.90
2015 general election Electorate: 5,937; Turnout: 4,100 (69.06%) −0.54	UDP hold Majority: 400 (9.74%) −3.96	Lloyd Jones	PUP	1,774	43.28	+1.06
2015 general election Electorate: 5,937; Turnout: 4,100 (69.06%) −0.54	UDP hold Majority: 400 (9.74%) −3.96	Karen Banner	BPP	52	1.35	-1.55
2012 general election Electorate: 5,404; Turnout: 3,761 (69.6%) −7.85	UDP hold Majority: 515 (13.7%) −14.94	Edmond Castro	UDP	2,103	55.92	−8.07
2012 general election Electorate: 5,404; Turnout: 3,761 (69.6%) −7.85	UDP hold Majority: 515 (13.7%) −14.94	Arthur Saldivar	PUP	1,588	42.22	+6.87
2012 general election Electorate: 5,404; Turnout: 3,761 (69.6%) −7.85	UDP hold Majority: 515 (13.7%) −14.94	Rufus X	PNP	49	1.3	-
2008 general election Electorate: 4,879; Turnout: 3,779 (77.45%) −3.55	UDP gain from PUP; Majority: 1,082 (28.64%) +21.4	Edmond Castro	UDP	2,418	63.99	+17.78
2008 general election Electorate: 4,879; Turnout: 3,779 (77.45%) −3.55	UDP gain from PUP; Majority: 1,082 (28.64%) +21.4	Earl "Bob Rancho" Perez	PUP	1,336	35.35	−18.1
2003 general election Electorate: 3,342; Turnout: 2,707 (81.0%) −5.62	PUP hold Majority: 196 (7.24%) +1.34	Maxwell Samuels	PUP	1,447	53.45	+1.3
2003 general election Electorate: 3,342; Turnout: 2,707 (81.0%) −5.62	PUP hold Majority: 196 (7.24%) +1.34	Felix Sutherland	UDP	1,251	46.21	−0.04
1998 general election Electorate: 2,526; Turnout: 2,188 (86.62%) +16.89	PUP hold Majority: 129 (5.9%) +5.7	Maxwell Samuels	PUP	1,141	52.15	+2.05
1998 general election Electorate: 2,526; Turnout: 2,188 (86.62%) +16.89	PUP hold Majority: 129 (5.9%) +5.7	Denton Belisle	UDP	1,012	46.25	−3.65
1998 general election Electorate: 2,526; Turnout: 2,188 (86.62%) +16.89	PUP hold Majority: 129 (5.9%) +5.7	Estevan Perrera	PDP	22	1.01	-
1998 general election Electorate: 2,526; Turnout: 2,188 (86.62%) +16.89	PUP hold Majority: 129 (5.9%) +5.7	Reni Coleman	NABR	8	0.36	-
1993 general election Electorate: 2,699; Turnout: 1,882 (69.73%) +2.78	PUP gain from UDP; Majority: 4 (0.2%) −2.6	Maxwell Samuels	PUP	943	50.1	+4.1
1993 general election Electorate: 2,699; Turnout: 1,882 (69.73%) +2.78	PUP gain from UDP; Majority: 4 (0.2%) −2.6	Sam Rhaburn	UDP	939	49.9	−1.1
1989 general election Electorate: 2,469; Turnout: 1,653 (66.95%) −5.89	UDP hold Majority: 46 (2.8%) −9.1	Sam Rhaburn	UDP	806	48.8	−7.1
1989 general election Electorate: 2,469; Turnout: 1,653 (66.95%) −5.89	UDP hold Majority: 46 (2.8%) −9.1	Maxwell Samuels	PUP	760	46.0	+2.6
1989 general election Electorate: 2,469; Turnout: 1,653 (66.95%) −5.89	UDP hold Majority: 46 (2.8%) −9.1	Rufus X	Independent	65	3.9	-
1984 general election Electorate: 2,106; Turnout: 1,534 (72.84%) −18.11	UDP gain from PUP; Majority: 193 (11.9%) +9.8	Sam Rhaburn	UDP	858	55.9	+7.8
1984 general election Electorate: 2,106; Turnout: 1,534 (72.84%) −18.11	UDP gain from PUP; Majority: 193 (11.9%) +9.8	Fred Hunter	PUP	665	43.4	−6.8
1979 general election Electorate: 1,690; Turnout: 1,537 (90.95%) +21.56	PUP hold Majority: 2.1% (−23.6)	Fred Hunter	PUP		50.2	−0.3
1979 general election Electorate: 1,690; Turnout: 1,537 (90.95%) +21.56	PUP hold Majority: 2.1% (−23.6)	Lionel Tillett	UDP		48.1	-
1974 general election Electorate: 1,359; Turnout: 943 (69.39%) −2.44	PUP hold Majority: 25.7% (−2.8)	Fred Hunter	PUP		50.5	−11.8
1974 general election Electorate: 1,359; Turnout: 943 (69.39%) −2.44	PUP hold Majority: 25.7% (−2.8)	William Gillett	Independent		24.8	-
1974 general election Electorate: 1,359; Turnout: 943 (69.39%) −2.44	PUP hold Majority: 25.7% (−2.8)	Leslie Day	UDP			-
1969 general election Electorate: 1,278; Turnout: 918 (71.83%) +7.22	PUP hold Majority: 28.5% (−11.1)	Fred Hunter	PUP		62.3	−5.5
1969 general election Electorate: 1,278; Turnout: 918 (71.83%) +7.22	PUP hold Majority: 28.5% (−11.1)	Roy Canton	NIP		33.8	+5.6
1965 general election Electorate: 1,585; Turnout: 1,024 (64.61%) −9.43	PUP hold Majority: 39.6% (+2.8)	Fred Hunter	PUP		67.8	+5.6
1965 general election Electorate: 1,585; Turnout: 1,024 (64.61%) −9.43	PUP hold Majority: 39.6% (+2.8)	Elwyn Pitts	NIP		28.2	+17.9
1961 general election Electorate: 1,406; Turnout: 1,041 (74.04%) n/a	PUP win Majority: 36.8% (n/a)	Fred Hunter	PUP		62.2	-
1961 general election Electorate: 1,406; Turnout: 1,041 (74.04%) n/a	PUP win Majority: 36.8% (n/a)	Arthur Wade	CDP		25.4	-
1961 general election Electorate: 1,406; Turnout: 1,041 (74.04%) n/a	PUP win Majority: 36.8% (n/a)	Marcelo Casasola	NIP		10.3	-
