= Pickstock (Belize House constituency) =

- Constituency for the Belize House of Representatives
- District: Belize
- Electorate: 3,537 (2015)
- Major settlements: Belize City (part)

Current constituency
- Created: 1961
- Party: People's United Party
- Area Representative: Anthony Mahler

Pickstock is an electoral constituency in the Belize District represented in the House of Representatives of the National Assembly of Belize since 2020 by Anthony Mahler of the People's United Party (PUP).

== Profile ==
The Pickstock constituency was created for the 1961 general election as part of a major nationwide redistricting. The constituency is based in north-central Belize City, bordered by the Freetown, Fort George, Albert, Collet and Lake Independence constituencies.

Pickstock's best known area representative is former Prime Minister George Cadle Price, who represented the constituency during the latter part of his long political career. The seat had been held by the People's United Party from its creation until 2008, when it was won by the UDP's Elrington on his fourth attempt. The Belize Progressive Party contested the seat for the first time in 2015.

== Area representatives ==
Election	Area representative	Party
1961	Gwendolyn Lizarraga	People's United Party
1965	Gwendolyn Lizarraga	People's United Party
1969	Gwendolyn Lizarraga	People's United Party
1974	Adolfo Lizarraga	People's United Party
1979	Jane Ellen Usher	People's United Party
1984	Jane Ellen Usher	People's United Party
1989	George Cadle Price	People's United Party
1993	George Cadle Price	People's United Party
1998	George Cadle Price	People's United Party
2003	Godfrey Smith	People's United Party
2008	Wilfred Elrington	United Democratic Party
2012	Wilfred Elrington	United Democratic Party
2015	Wilfred Elrington	United Democratic Party
2020	Anthony Mahler	People's United Party
2025	Anthony Mahler	People's United Party

== Elections ==
Election	Political result	Candidate	Party	Votes	%	±%
2025 general election Electorate: Election was uncontested	PUP hold	Anthony Robert Mahler	PUP	unopposed		
2020 general election Electorate: 3,997; Turnout: 3,281 (82.09%) +14.83	PUP gain from UDP; Majority: 1,996 (60.84%) +57.56	Anthony Robert Mahler	PUP	2,570	78.33	+32.72
2020 general election Electorate: 3,997; Turnout: 3,281 (82.09%) +14.83	PUP gain from UDP; Majority: 1,996 (60.84%) +57.56	Anthony Martinez	UDP	574	17.49	−31.40
2020 general election Electorate: 3,997; Turnout: 3,281 (82.09%) +14.83	PUP gain from UDP; Majority: 1,996 (60.84%) +57.56	Patrick Rogers	BPP	60	1.83	−1.70
2015 general election Electorate: 3,537; Turnout: 2,379 (67.26%) +4.63	UDP hold Majority: 78 (3.28%) −0.76	Wilfred Elrington	UDP	1,163	48.89	−2.22
2015 general election Electorate: 3,537; Turnout: 2,379 (67.26%) +4.63	UDP hold Majority: 78 (3.28%) −0.76	Francis Donald Smith	PUP	1,085	45.61	−1.46
2015 general election Electorate: 3,537; Turnout: 2,379 (67.26%) +4.63	UDP hold Majority: 78 (3.28%) −0.76	Patrick Rogers	BPP	84	3.53	-
2012 general election Electorate: 3,243; Turnout: 2,031 (62.63%) −9.41	UDP hold Majority: 82 (4.04%) −9.95	Wilfred Elrington	UDP	1,038	51.11	−5.19
2012 general election Electorate: 3,243; Turnout: 2,031 (62.63%) −9.41	UDP hold Majority: 82 (4.04%) −9.95	Francis Donald Smith	PUP	956	47.07	+4.76
2008 general election Electorate: 3,294; Turnout: 2,373 (72.04%) −9.05	UDP gain from PUP; Majority: 332 (13.99%) −14.56	Wilfred Elrington	UDP	1,336	56.3	+40.66
2008 general election Electorate: 3,294; Turnout: 2,373 (72.04%) −9.05	UDP gain from PUP; Majority: 332 (13.99%) −14.56	Godfrey Smith	PUP	1,004	42.31	−13.49
2003 general election Electorate: 1,987; Turnout: 1,611 (81.09%) −8.97	PUP hold Majority: 460 (28.55%) +21.09	Godfrey Smith	PUP	899	55.8	+2.63
2003 general election Electorate: 1,987; Turnout: 1,611 (81.09%) −8.97	PUP hold Majority: 460 (28.55%) +21.09	Wilfred Elrington	Independent	439	27.25	-
2003 general election Electorate: 1,987; Turnout: 1,611 (81.09%) −8.97	PUP hold Majority: 460 (28.55%) +21.09	Diane Haylock	UDP	252	15.64	−30.07
1998 general election Electorate: 1,489; Turnout: 1,341 (90.06%) +32.35	PUP hold Majority: 100 (7.46%) +1.66	George Cadle Price	PUP	713	53.17	+0.27
1998 general election Electorate: 1,489; Turnout: 1,341 (90.06%) +32.35	PUP hold Majority: 100 (7.46%) +1.66	Wilfred Elrington	UDP	613	45.71	−1.39
1998 general election Electorate: 1,489; Turnout: 1,341 (90.06%) +32.35	PUP hold Majority: 100 (7.46%) +1.66	Ivan Roberts	PDP	7	0.52	-
1993 general election Electorate: 2,424; Turnout: 1,399 (57.71%) −4.01	PUP hold Majority: 81 (5.8%) −15.4	George Cadle Price	PUP	740	52.9	−6.9
1993 general election Electorate: 2,424; Turnout: 1,399 (57.71%) −4.01	PUP hold Majority: 81 (5.8%) −15.4	Wilfred Elrington	UDP	659	47.1	+8.5
1989 general election Electorate: 2,453; Turnout: 1,514 (61.72%) −7.31	PUP hold Majority: 322 (21.2%) +17.2	George Cadle Price	PUP	906	59.8	+8.2
1989 general election Electorate: 2,453; Turnout: 1,514 (61.72%) −7.31	PUP hold Majority: 322 (21.2%) +17.2	Cyril Davis	UDP	584	38.6	−9.0
1984 general election Electorate: 2,241; Turnout: 1,547 (69.03%) −19.89	PUP hold Majority: 53 (4.0%) −2.2	Jane Ellen Usher	PUP	789	51.6	−1.2
1984 general election Electorate: 2,241; Turnout: 1,547 (69.03%) −19.89	PUP hold Majority: 53 (4.0%) −2.2	Ramon Vasquez	UDP	736	47.6	+1.0
1979 general election Electorate: 1,652; Turnout: 1,469 (88.92%) +20.82	PUP hold Majority: 6.2% (+5.8)	Jane Ellen Usher	PUP		52.8	+3.5
1979 general election Electorate: 1,652; Turnout: 1,469 (88.92%) +20.82	PUP hold Majority: 6.2% (+5.8)	Paul Rodriguez	UDP		46.6	−2.3
1974 general election Electorate: 1,304; Turnout: 888 (68.1%) −10.53	PUP hold Majority: 0.4% (−29.4)	Adolfo Lizarraga	PUP		49.3	−15.3
1974 general election Electorate: 1,304; Turnout: 888 (68.1%) −10.53	PUP hold Majority: 0.4% (−29.4)	Paul Rodriguez	UDP		48.9	-
1969 general election Electorate: 1,315; Turnout: 1,034 (78.63%) +9.85	PUP hold Majority: 29.8% (−8.6)	Gwendolyn Lizarraga	PUP		64.6	−3.7
1969 general election Electorate: 1,315; Turnout: 1,034 (78.63%) +9.85	PUP hold Majority: 29.8% (−8.6)	Charles Woods	NIP		34.8	+4.9
1965 general election Electorate: 2,172; Turnout: 1,494 (68.78%) −15.62	PUP hold Majority: 38.4% (−13.9)	Gwendolyn Lizarraga	PUP		68.3	−0.3
1965 general election Electorate: 2,172; Turnout: 1,494 (68.78%) −15.62	PUP hold Majority: 38.4% (−13.9)	Jaime Staines	NIP		29.9	+13.6
1961 general election Electorate: 1,680; Turnout: 1,418 (84.4%) n/a	PUP win Majority: 52.3% (n/a)	Gwendolyn Lizarraga	PUP		68.6	-
1961 general election Electorate: 1,680; Turnout: 1,418 (84.4%) n/a	PUP win Majority: 52.3% (n/a)	Jaime Staines	NIP		16.3	-
1961 general election Electorate: 1,680; Turnout: 1,418 (84.4%) n/a	PUP win Majority: 52.3% (n/a)	Claire Gill	CDP		13.3	-
1961 general election Electorate: 1,680; Turnout: 1,418 (84.4%) n/a	PUP win Majority: 52.3% (n/a)	Robert Taylor	Independent		0.7	-

National Assembly of Belize
Preceded by Caribbean Shores	Constituency represented by the prime minister 1989–1993	Succeeded by Caribbean Shores
Preceded by Caribbean Shores	Constituency represented by the leader of the opposition 1993–1996	Succeeded by Fort George
