= Orange Walk South =

Electoral constituency in Belize

- Constituency for the Belize House of Representatives
- District: Orange Walk

Current constituency

Orange Walk South is an electoral constituency in the Orange Walk District represented in the House of Representatives of the National Assembly of Belize.

== Area representatives ==
Election	Area representative	Party
1961	Guadalupe Pech	PUP
1965	Guadalupe Pech	PUP
1969	Guadalupe Pech	PUP
1974	Guadalupe Pech	PUP
1979	Guadalupe Pech	PUP
1974	Onesimo Pech	UDP
1989	Guadalupe Pech	PUP
1993	Ruben Campos	UDP
1998	Salustiano Lizama	PUP
2003	Ismael Cal	PUP
2008	Marco Pech	UDP
2012	Jose Abelardo Mai	PUP
2015	Jose Abelardo Mai	PUP
2020	Jose Abelardo Mai	PUP
2025	Jose Abelardo Mai	PUP

== Elections ==
Election	Political result	Candidate	Party	Votes	%	±%
2025 general election Electorate: 7,534; Turnout: 5,439 (72.19%) −12.12	PUP hold Majority: 1,531 (28.15%) +3.42	Jose Abelardo Mai	PUP	3,462	63.65	+2.31
2025 general election Electorate: 7,534; Turnout: 5,439 (72.19%) −12.12	PUP hold Majority: 1,531 (28.15%) +3.42	German Evan Tillett	UDP	1,931	35.50	−1.11
