= 2003 Belizean general election =

- 5 March 2003

All 29 seats in the House of Representatives 15 seats needed for a majority
- Registered: 126,202
- Turnout: 79.55% (▼10.58pp)
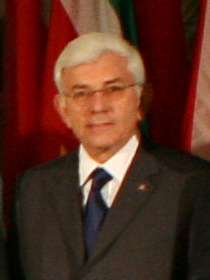

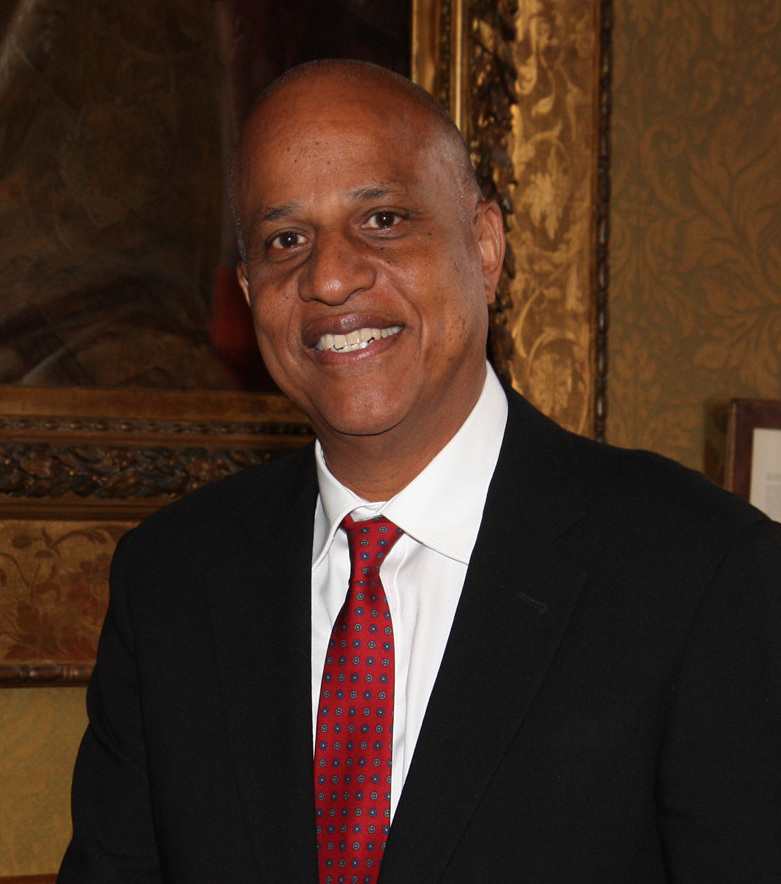
	First party	Second party
Leader	Said Musa	Dean Barrow
Party	PUP	UDP
Leader's seat	Fort George	Queen's Square
Last election	59.67%, 26 seats	39.41%, 3 seats
Seats won	22	7
Seat change	▼4	▲4
Popular vote	53,314	44,996
Percentage	53.54%	45.19%
Swing	▼6.13 pp	▲5.78 pp
- Popular vote by constituency. As Belize uses the FPTP electoral system, seat totals are not determined by popular vote, but instead via results by each constituency
Prime Minister before election
Said Musa
PUP
Elected Prime Minister
Said Musa
PUP

General elections were held in Belize on 5 March 2003. Belizeans elected 29 members to the House of Representatives for a term of five years. The result was a victory for the ruling People's United Party (PUP), which won 22 of the 29 seats.

== Background ==
The PUP were seeking a second consecutive term in office after recording significant development in the economy from 1998 to 2003. Their opponents, the UDP, sought to replace them in office because of charges of corruption and mismanagement of public funds. Previous to this election, the parties had alternated their time in office since independence.

As an aside, municipal elections had originally been called for this date, creating a situation of triple elections in one day, a first for the Caribbean region according to Myrtle Palacio of the EBD.

As a postscript, Cayo South winner Agripino Cawich Sr. died of illness in August 2003. UDP candidate John Saldivar, who had lost to Cawich in March, won the subsequent by-election over son Joaquin Cawich in October.

This general election was also the first in Belizean history in which former Prime Minister George Cadle Price was not a candidate. Price, who stood down from the Pickstock constituency, had contested every prior general election since 1954, winning each time except 1984.

After what Prime Minister Said Musa called a "drawn-out" campaign that he said affected the country's ability to function, Musa called a house meeting on January 24, 2003 and formally announced that he had asked Governor General Sir Colville Young to dissolve the National Assembly of Belize by February 4, decree nomination of candidates for elections on February 17, and call elections on March 5.

Elections were called early; they had not been constitutionally due until at least November 2003. The Opposition UDP, led by attorney Dean Barrow and eager to recover from the disastrous 1998 campaign, declared themselves ready to battle. Governor General Young officially issued the proclamation dissolving the House on February 4, as requested by Mr. Musa.

== Campaign ==
The People's United Party had nominated candidates through much of 2001 and 2002. Among the more hotly contested races was Pickstock, where Attorney General and Senator Godfrey Smith defeated Bobby Usher of the PUP old guard. A number of other sitting members declared that they would not run again, including Jorge Espat in Freetown (relieved by Francis Fonseca) and Henry Canton in Stann Creek West (replaced by Rodwell Ferguson). The PUP prepared a visually oriented campaign, stressing their accomplishments in office as the governing party and citing weak links in the UDP armor.

The United Democratic Party's selection process was rife with controversy. In May 2002, Pickstock standard bearer and musician Kenny Morgan was removed (he would eventually be replaced by Diane Haylock). Attorney Wilfred Elrington contested Pickstock independently after running into party officials over Haylock's appointment; brother Hubert, who had already left the party, likewise contested independently in Lake Independence against the sitting Cordel Hyde. Another bone of contention was Albert, where the UDP selected Marilyn Williams over Sydney Fuller. Fuller ran independently but Williams was herself the subject of investigation over allegations that she was a U.S. citizen and therefore ineligible to participate in the elections. Representatives in Lake Independence and Belize Rural Central were also replaced.

This was the first election for the We the People Reform Movement, which put up candidates in Corozal, Orange Walk and Belize District. Independents appeared in all six districts. The election was tagged as featuring the highest number of independent candidates ever, including former UDP candidate Wilfred Elrington in Pickstock. Elrington finished second to winner Godfrey Smith but doubled up UDP choice Diane Haylock.

The 2003 general election can be considered one of the most glitzy and packaged. The PUP ran a mostly upbeat campaign, focusing on celebrating the works achieved in its five years in office. The campaign was highlighted by the release of a CD of political campaign songs written by prominent Belizeans, particularly "Welcome to the Party" by Supa G. "Party" saw three translations and numerous airings over the course of two months of campaigning, invariably accompanied by PUP officials smiling and making contact with their constituents.

The UDP chose substance over style in a realist campaign. Their commercials and statements attacked what they saw as latent corruption in the PUP's governing of the country. In February a broadside of scandals rocked the retiring administration, in sectors as varied as transport and education, and the UDP pushed every single one as an indication of the things the UDP would not tolerate if elected.

We The People and other independent candidates stressed their belief that the system needed to change and that overall life needed to be improved for all Belizeans. The independents were not as heavily represented on the media but saw their opportunities as they came.

== Conduct ==
The elections were supervised by the Elections and Boundaries Department, headed by Chief Elections Officer Myrtle Palacio and her four person administrative staff. In preparation for the possibility of general elections and the certainty of municipal elections, the EBD had cleaned out their electoral rolls following the 1998 re-registration exercise, sought to boost voter confidence through the media, and trained fellow civil servants across the country to prepare for the rigorous test of conducting three separate elections in one day.

The EBD commanded 1,432 election workers, 567 municipal, 865 general. The workers were divided according to post: returning officer (in charge of the station and vote), election clerks and assistants, presiding officers (at each polling area), poll clerks and assistants, and counting clerks. Statutory Instruments Nos. 14 and 43 of 2003 respectively guaranteed voters the right to register up to February 10, 2003 in lieu of nomination day and allowed for more counting agents assigned to the general elections.

On election day itself, despite the usual early headaches, voting went smoothly. Palacio noted in her end of year report that no petitions for recounts were presented for any election. Nevertheless, The Guardian newspaper of March 16 saw an article written by then member of the Elections and Boundaries Commission and editor Herbert Panton, which criticized the electoral process. For more, see the Guardian article.

A number of media houses joined forces to cover wire-to-wire the events of March 5. Great Belize Television (Channel 5) announced a partnership with RSV Media Center, headlined by LOVE FM, on January 13, 2003. Their coverage used the tagline "Decision 2003."

Later on, Tropical Vision Limited Channel 7 teamed up with fledgling Krem Television and Radio. Their coverage was nicknamed "The Moment" and used "Lose Yourself" by Eminem as its theme song.

Election day began at 5:00 am for workers and 7:00 AM for voters. Voters participated from 7:00 AM to 6:00 PM; counting began at 8:00 PM. Palacio reported that Pickstock's result, a victory for Godfrey Smith, was the first official result to come in, at 10:00 PM. By 12:45 AM Thursday morning, the PUP had amassed the majority fifteen seats, and by 1:10 AM could start celebrating as the CEO stamped the particulars. While the UDP had regained 6% of votes over the 1998 results, the PUP still beat them 53-45.

== Results ==
Party	Votes	%	Seats	+/–
People's United Party	53,314	53.54	22	–4
United Democratic Party	44,996	45.19	7	+4
Independents	1,260	1.27	0	0
Total	99,570	100.00	29	0
Valid votes	99,570	99.18		
Invalid/blank votes	822	0.82		
Total votes	100,392	100.00		
Registered voters/turnout	126,202	79.55		
Source: Elections and Boundaries Department

=== By constituency ===
Division	Electorate	Turnout	%	Candidate	Party	Votes	%
Albert	2,286	1,789	78.1	Mark Espat	People's United Party	1,482	82.8
Albert	2,286	1,789	78.1	Marilyn Williams	United Democratic Party	253	14.1
Albert	2,286	1,789	78.1	Sydney Fuller	Independent	54	3.0
Albert	2,286	1,789	78.1	Rejected votes		13	0.7
Belize Rural Central	4,543	3,173	69.8	Ralph Fonseca	People's United Party	2,110	66.5
Belize Rural Central	4,543	3,173	69.8	Colin Gillett	United Democratic Party	1,063	33.5
Belize Rural Central	4,543	3,173	69.8	Rejected votes		0	0.0
Belize Rural North	3,341	2,707	81.0	Maxwell Samuels	People's United Party	1,447	53.5
Belize Rural North	3,341	2,707	81.0	Felix Sutherland	United Democratic Party	1,251	46.2
Belize Rural North	3,341	2,707	81.0	Rejected votes		9	0.3
Belize Rural South	3,712	2,993	80.6	Manuel Heredia	United Democratic Party	1,539	51.4
Belize Rural South	3,712	2,993	80.6	Anna Patricia Arceo	People's United Party	1,430	47.8
Belize Rural South	3,712	2,993	80.6	Rejected votes		24	0.8
Caribbean Shores	4,023	3,021	75.09	Jose Coye	People's United Party	1,592	52.7
Caribbean Shores	4,023	3,021	75.09	Oscar Ayuso	United Democratic Party	1,429	47.3
Caribbean Shores	4,023	3,021	75.09	Rejected votes		24	0.8
Cayo Central	6,022	4,846	80.5	Mario Castellanos	People's United Party	2,438	50.3
Cayo Central	6,022	4,846	80.5	Rene Montero	United Democratic Party	2,260	46.6
Cayo Central	6,022	4,846	80.5	Eduardo Juan	Independent	63	1.3
Cayo Central	6,022	4,846	80.5	Ivan Roberts	Independent	26	0.5
Cayo Central	6,022	4,846	80.5	Rejected votes		58	1.2
Cayo North	6,842	5,672	82.9	Ainslie Leslie	People's United Party	2,917	51.4
Cayo North	6,842	5,672	82.9	Dean Williams	United Democratic Party	2,707	47.7
Cayo North	6,842	5,672	82.9	Rejected votes		49	0.9
Cayo South	8,344	6,287	75.4	Agripino Cawich	People's United Party	3,111	49.5
Cayo South	8,344	6,287	75.4	John Saldivar	United Democratic Party	3,087	49.1
Cayo South	8,344	6,287	75.4	Rejected votes		80	1.3
Cayo West	4,656	4,018	86.3	Erwin Contreras	United Democratic Party	2,180	54.3
Cayo West	4,656	4,018	86.3	Kendall Mendez	People's United Party	1,800	44.8
Cayo West	4,656	4,018	86.3	Rejected votes		3	0.9
Collet	2,848	1892	66.4	Patrick Faber	United Democratic Party	948	50.1
Collet	2,848	1892	66.4	Remijio Montejo	People's United Party	889	47.0
Collet	2,848	1892	66.4	Paul Jones	Independent	55	2.9
Collet	2,848	1892	66.4	Rejected votes		0	0.0
Corozal Bay	5,274	4,058	76.9	Juan Vildo Marin	People's United Party	2,089	51.5
Corozal Bay	5,274	4,058	76.9	Carlos Castillo	United Democratic Party	1,827	45.0
Corozal Bay	5,274	4,058	76.9	Roy Rodriguez	Independent	86	2.1
Corozal Bay	5,274	4,058	76.9	Rejected votes		56	1.4
Corozal North	5,276	3,491	66.2	Valdemar Castillo	People's United Party	1,713	49.1
Corozal North	5,276	3,491	66.2	Nemencio Acosta	United Democratic Party	1,705	48.8
Corozal North	5,276	3,491	66.2	Felipe Tzul	Independent	56	1.6
Corozal North	5,276	3,491	66.2	Rejected votes		17	0.5
Corozal South East	4,752	4,194	88.3	Florencio Marin	People's United Party	2,155	51.4
Corozal South East	4,752	4,194	88.3	Servando Samos	United Democratic Party	1,930	46.0
Corozal South East	4,752	4,194	88.3	Hipolito Bautista	Independent	62	1.5
Corozal South East	4,752	4,194	88.3	Rejected votes		47	1.1
Corozal South West	3,893	3,473	89.2	Gabriel Martinez	United Democratic Party	1,835	52.8
Corozal South West	3,893	3,473	89.2	Gregorio Garcia	People's United Party	1,593	45.9
Corozal South West	3,893	3,473	89.2	Lucilo Teck	Independent	20	0.6
Corozal South West	3,893	3,473	89.2	Rejected votes		25	0.7
Dangriga	4,254	2,914	68.5	Sylvia Flores	People's United Party	1,527	52.4
Dangriga	4,254	2,914	68.5	Russell Garcia	United Democratic Party	1299	44.6
Dangriga	4,254	2,914	68.5	Ian Caliz	Independent	44	1.5
Dangriga	4,254	2,914	68.5	Rejected votes		44	1.5
Fort George	2,067	1,546	74.8	Said Musa	People's United Party	1,173	76.6
Fort George	2,067	1,546	74.8	Carlos Walker	United Democratic Party	320	20.9
Fort George	2,067	1,546	74.8	Francis Gegg	Independent	38	2.5
Fort George	2,067	1,546	74.8	Rejected votes		15	1.0
Freetown	2,510	1,925	76.7	Francis Fonseca	People's United Party	1,154	60.0
Freetown	2,510	1,925	76.7	Douglas Singh	United Democratic Party	771	40.0
Freetown	2,510	1,925	76.7	Rejected votes		0	0.0
Lake Independence	6,176	4,447	72.0	Cordel Hyde	People's United Party	2,764	62.2
Lake Independence	6,176	4,447	72.0	Anthony Leslie	United Democratic Party	1,499	33.7
Lake Independence	6,176	4,447	72.0	Patrick Rogers	Independent	96	2.5
Lake Independence	6,176	4,447	72.0	Hubert Elrington	Independent	88	2.0
Lake Independence	6,176	4,447	72.0	Rejected votes		61	1.4
Mesopotamia	2,178	1,522	69.9	Michael Finnegan	United Democratic Party	1,024	55.8
Mesopotamia	2,178	1,522	69.9	Phillip Brackett	People's United Party	953	44.2
Mesopotamia	2,178	1,522	69.9	Rejected votes		8	0.5
Orange Walk Central	3,396	2,782	81.9	Johnny Briceno	People's United Party	1,713	61.6
Orange Walk Central	3,396	2,782	81.9	Miguel Urbina	United Democratic Party	1,050	37.7
Orange Walk Central	3,396	2,782	81.9	Rejected votes		19	0.7
Orange Walk East	5,486	4,590	83.7	Dave Burgos	People's United Party	2,400	52.3
Orange Walk East	5,486	4,590	83.7	Elodio Aragon	United Democratic Party	2,144	46.7
Orange Walk East	5,486	4,590	83.7	Rejected votes		46	1.0
Orange Walk North	5,026	4,324	86.0	Servulo Baeza	People's United Party	2,256	52.2
Orange Walk North	5,026	4,324	86.0	Phillip De La Fuente	United Democratic Party	2,040	47.2
Orange Walk North	5,026	4,324	86.0	Rejected votes		28	0.6
Orange Walk South	5,276	4,675	88.6	Ismael Cal	People's United Party	2,655	56.8
Orange Walk South	5,276	4,675	88.6	Julian Padron	United Democratic Party	1,971	42.2
Orange Walk South	5,276	4,675	88.6	Erwin Sanchez	Independent	37	0.8
Orange Walk South	5,276	4,675	88.6	Rejected votes		12	0.2
Pickstock	1,987	1,611	81.09	Godfrey Smith	People's United Party	899	55.8
Pickstock	1,987	1,611	81.09	Wilfred Elrington	Independent	439	27.3
Pickstock	1,987	1,611	81.09	Diane Haylock	United Democratic Party	252	15.6
Pickstock	1,987	1,611	81.09	Rejected votes		21	1.3
Port Loyola	5,798	4,014	69.2	Anthony Martinez	United Democratic Party	2,386	59.4
Port Loyola	5,798	4,014	69.2	Dolores Balderamos-García	People's United Party	1,565	38.9
Port Loyola	5,798	4,014	69.2	Rejected votes		18	0.4
Queen's Square	2,690	2,156	80.2	Dean Barrow	United Democratic Party	1,203	55.8
Queen's Square	2,690	2,156	80.2	Richard Bradley	People's United Party	953	44.2
Queen's Square	2,690	2,156	80.2	Rejected votes		17	0.8
Stann Creek West	5,718	4,445	77.7	Rodwell Ferguson	People's United Party	2,486	55.9
Stann Creek West	5,718	4,445	77.7	Glenford Eiley	United Democratic Party	1,895	42.6
Stann Creek West	5,718	4,445	77.7	Michael Flores	Independent	30	0.7
Stann Creek West	5,718	4,445	77.7	Rejected votes		34	0.7
Toledo East	4,269	3,325	77.9	Michael Espat	People's United Party	1,757	52.8
Toledo East	4,269	3,325	77.9	Eden Martinez	United Democratic Party	1,568	47.2
Toledo East	4,269	3,325	77.9	Rejected votes		39	1.1
Toledo West	4,908	4,349	88.6	Marcial Mes	People's United Party	2,368	54.5
Toledo West	4,908	4,349	88.6	Dennis Usher	United Democratic Party	1,940	44.6
Toledo West	4,908	4,349	88.6	Leonardo Acal	Independent	21	0.5
Toledo West	4,908	4,349	88.6	Rejected votes		20	0.4
