= Fort George (Belize House constituency) =

- Constituency for the Belize House of Representatives
- District: Belize
- Electorate: 3,084 (2015)
- Major settlements: Belize City (part)

Current constituency
- Created: 1961
- Party: People's United Party
- Area Representative: Henry Charles Usher

Fort George is an electoral constituency in the Belize District represented in the House of Representatives of the National Assembly of Belize represented by Henry Charles Usher since 2020. It was previously represented by Usher’s father and former Prime Minister of Belize Said Musa of the People's United Party from 1974 to 1984 and from 1989 until the 2020 general election.

== Profile ==
The Fort George constituency was created for the 1961 general election as part of a major nationwide redistricting. The constituency is based in the easternmost areas of Belize City along the Caribbean Sea, bordered by the Pickstock and Albert constituencies. It is connected to the latter by the Belize City Swing Bridge.

== Area representatives ==
Election	Area representative	Party
1961	Alexander Hunter	PUP
1965	Alexander Hunter	PUP
1969	Alexander Hunter	PUP
1974	Dean Lindo	UDP
1979	Said Musa	PUP
1984	Dean Lindo	UDP
1989	Said Musa	PUP
1993	Said Musa	PUP
1998	Said Musa	PUP
2003	Said Musa	PUP
2008	Said Musa	PUP
2012	Said Musa	PUP
2015	Said Musa	PUP
2020	Henry Charles Usher	PUP
2025	Henry Charles Usher	PUP

== Elections ==
Election	Political result	Candidate	Party	Votes	%	±%
2025 general election Electorate: Election was uncontested	PUP hold	Henry Charles Usher	PUP	unopposed		
2020 general election Electorate: 1,876; Turnout: 1,541 (82.14%) −3.68	PUP hold Majority: 714 (39.73%) +42.41	Henry Charles Usher	PUP	983	64.84	-4.22
2020 general election Electorate: 1,876; Turnout: 1,541 (82.14%) −3.68	PUP hold Majority: 714 (39.73%) +42.41	Melvin Hewlett	UDP	499	32.92	+5.76
2020 general election Electorate: 1,876; Turnout: 1,541 (82.14%) −3.68	PUP hold Majority: 714 (39.73%) +42.41	William Maheia	BPP	34	2.24	+ 0.07
2015 general election Electorate: 3,084; Turnout: 1,797 (58.27%) −3.68	PUP hold Majority: 714 (39.73%) +14.64	Said Musa	PUP	1,241	69.06	+7.13
2015 general election Electorate: 3,084; Turnout: 1,797 (58.27%) −3.68	PUP hold Majority: 714 (39.73%) +14.64	Roger Espejo	UDP	488	27.16	−9.68
2015 general election Electorate: 3,084; Turnout: 1,797 (58.27%) −3.68	PUP hold Majority: 714 (39.73%) +14.64	Rollin Powery	BPP	39	2.17	-
2012 general election Electorate: 3,133; Turnout: 1,941 (61.95%) −7.88	PUP hold Majority: 487 (25.09%) +9.05	Said Musa	PUP	1,202	61.93	+4.29
2012 general election Electorate: 3,133; Turnout: 1,941 (61.95%) −7.88	PUP hold Majority: 487 (25.09%) +9.05	George Gough	UDP	715	36.84	−4.76
2008 general election Electorate: 3,195; Turnout: 2,231 (69.83%) −4.93	PUP hold Majority: 358 (16.04%) −39.14	Said Musa	PUP	1,286	57.64	−18.23
2008 general election Electorate: 3,195; Turnout: 2,231 (69.83%) −4.93	PUP hold Majority: 358 (16.04%) −39.14	George Gough	UDP	928	41.6	+20.91
2003 general election Electorate: 2,068; Turnout: 1,546 (74.76%) −15.67	PUP hold Majority: 853 (55.18%) +5.41	Said Musa	PUP	1,173	75.87	+1.28
2003 general election Electorate: 2,068; Turnout: 1,546 (74.76%) −15.67	PUP hold Majority: 853 (55.18%) +5.41	Carlos Walker	UDP	320	20.69	−4.13
2003 general election Electorate: 2,068; Turnout: 1,546 (74.76%) −15.67	PUP hold Majority: 853 (55.18%) +5.41	Francis Gegg	Independent	38	2.46	-
1998 general election Electorate: 1,693; Turnout: 1,531 (90.43%) +34.36	PUP hold Majority: 762 (49.77%) +13.17	Said Musa	PUP	1,142	74.59	+6.29
1998 general election Electorate: 1,693; Turnout: 1,531 (90.43%) +34.36	PUP hold Majority: 762 (49.77%) +13.17	Derek Aikman	UDP	380	24.82	−6.9
1993 general election Electorate: 2,832; Turnout: 1,588 (56.07%) −6.76	PUP hold Majority: 580 (36.6%) +11.4	Said Musa	PUP	1,084	68.3	+6.2
1993 general election Electorate: 2,832; Turnout: 1,588 (56.07%) −6.76	PUP hold Majority: 580 (36.6%) +11.4	Michael Godoy	UDP	504	31.7	−5.2
1989 general election Electorate: 2,833; Turnout: 1,780 (62.83%) −3.78	PUP gain from UDP; Majority: 449 (25.2%) +21.5	Said Musa	PUP	1,105	62.1	+14.5
1989 general election Electorate: 2,833; Turnout: 1,780 (62.83%) −3.78	PUP gain from UDP; Majority: 449 (25.2%) +21.5	Dean Lindo	UDP	656	36.9	−14.4
1984 general election Electorate: 2,294; Turnout: 1,528 (66.61%) −22.31	UDP gain from PUP; Majority: 57 (3.7%) −6.8	Dean Lindo	UDP	784	51.3	+4.3
1984 general election Electorate: 2,294; Turnout: 1,528 (66.61%) −22.31	UDP gain from PUP; Majority: 57 (3.7%) −6.8	Said Musa	PUP	727	47.6	−4.5
1979 general election Electorate: 1,562; Turnout: 1,389 (88.92%) +20.85	PUP gain from UDP; Majority: 10.5% (+5.3)	Said Musa	PUP		52.1	+5.5
1979 general election Electorate: 1,562; Turnout: 1,389 (88.92%) +20.85	PUP gain from UDP; Majority: 10.5% (+5.3)	Dean Lindo	UDP		47.0	−4.8
1974 general election Electorate: 1,287; Turnout: 876 (68.07%) −12.81	UDP gain from PUP; Majority: 5.2% (+2.2)	Dean Lindo	UDP		51.8	-
1974 general election Electorate: 1,287; Turnout: 876 (68.07%) −12.81	UDP gain from PUP; Majority: 5.2% (+2.2)	Said Musa	PUP		46.6	−4.3
1969 general election Electorate: 1,229; Turnout: 994 (80.88%) +8.95	PUP hold Majority: 3.0% (−6.8)	Alexander Hunter	PUP		50.9	−3.4
1969 general election Electorate: 1,229; Turnout: 994 (80.88%) +8.95	PUP hold Majority: 3.0% (−6.8)	Dean Lindo	NIP		47.9	+3.4
1965 general election Electorate: 1,767; Turnout: 1,271 (71.93%) −14.22	PUP hold Majority: 9.8% (−21.9)	Alexander Hunter	PUP		54.3	−5.9
1965 general election Electorate: 1,767; Turnout: 1,271 (71.93%) −14.22	PUP hold Majority: 9.8% (−21.9)	Helen Taylor	NIP		44.5	+16.0
1961 general election Electorate: 1,422; Turnout: 1,225 (86.15%) n/a	PUP win Majority: 31.7% (n/a)	Alexander Hunter	PUP		60.2	-
1961 general election Electorate: 1,422; Turnout: 1,225 (86.15%) n/a	PUP win Majority: 31.7% (n/a)	Herbert Fuller	NIP		28.5	-
1961 general election Electorate: 1,422; Turnout: 1,225 (86.15%) n/a	PUP win Majority: 31.7% (n/a)	Denbeigh Jeffery	CDP		10.8	-

National Assembly of Belize
Preceded by Pickstock	Constituency represented by the leader of the opposition 1996–1998	Succeeded by Queen's Square
Preceded by Caribbean Shores	Constituency represented by the prime minister 1998–2008	Succeeded by Queen's Square
Preceded by Queen's Square	Constituency represented by the leader of the opposition 2008	Succeeded by Orange Walk Central
