= Albert (Belize House constituency) =

Constituency in Belize

Coordinates: 17.4917°N 88.1875°W

- Constituency for the Belize House of Representatives

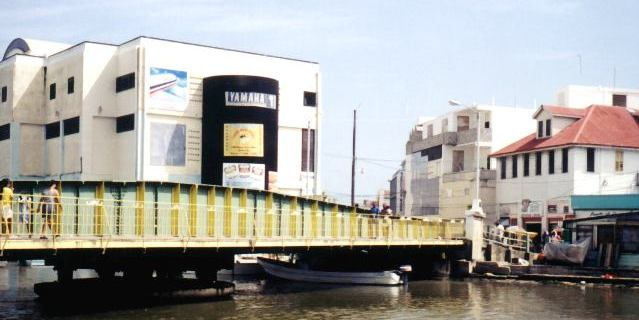
- Belize City's historic Swing Bridge with the Belize City Commercial Center (located in Albert) in the background.
- District: Belize
- Electorate: 3,468 (2015)
- Major settlements: Belize City (part)

Current constituency
- Created: 1961
- Party: United Democratic Party
- Area Representative: Tracy Taegar-Panton

Albert is an electoral constituency in the Belize District of Belize.

== History ==
The Albert constituency was created for the 1961 general election as part of a major nationwide redistricting. Albert is named after the principal street (Albert Street) within its jurisdiction.

Albert Constituency is home to the headquarters of most of Belize's banks, Belize City's major stores, The Supreme Court of Belize City, The Bliss Center for the Performing Arts, The Belize City House of Culture, Battlefield Park, the Belize City Commercial Center, and several government offices.

== Location and geographic setting ==
Albert, often referred to locally as Albert Division, is located entirely within the boundaries of Belize City, and is one of 10 constituencies in the Belize District that fall within its city limits. Albert is considered the downtown area of Belize City and is located on the eastern part of the city's southside.

Albert is bounded by the Caribbean Sea to the east and south, Haulover Creek to the north, and the constituencies of Mesopotamia and Queen's Square to the west. The historic Belize City Swing Bridge, which crosses Haulover Creek, connects Albert with the Fort George constituency. Albert is Belize's smallest constituency in terms of area.

== Politics ==
In an era in which the People's United Party overwhelmingly dominated Belizean national politics, Philip Goldson of the National Independence Party first won Albert in 1965. He held the seat as a member of the NIP, then the UDP and finally the NABR until his retirement in 1998. Goldson was the sole opposition member in the Belize House during much of the 1960s and early 1970s.

In 1998 Mark Espat won the constituency for the PUP for the first time in 37 years, defeating the UDP's Tom Morrison. Espat was re-elected by comfortable margins until his retirement in 2012.

Albert is currently represented in the House of Representatives of Belize by the UDP's Tracy Taegar- Panton, who is Minister of State with responsibility for Investment, Trade and Commerce.

== Area representatives ==
| Election | Area representative | Party |
|---|---|---|
| 1961 | Frederick Westby | PUP |
| 1965 | Philip Goldson | NIP |
| 1973 | Philip Goldson | UDP |
| 1992 | Philip Goldson | NABR |
| 1998 | Mark Espat | PUP |
| 2003 | Mark Espat | PUP |
| 2008 | Mark Espat | PUP |
| 2012 | Herman R. Longsworth | UDP |
| 2015 | Tracy Panton | UDP |
| 2020 | Tracy Panton | UDP |
| 2025 | Tracy Panton | UDP |

== Elections ==
| Election | Political result | Candidate | Party | Votes | % | ±% |
|---|---|---|---|---|---|---|
| 2025 general election Electorate: 3,111; Turnout: 2,230 (75.22%) −12.48 | UDP hold Majority: 197 (8.81%) +7.17 | Tracy Panton | UDP | 1,243 | 53.12 | +2.30 |
| 2025 general election Electorate: 3,111; Turnout: 2,230 (75.22%) −12.48 | UDP hold Majority: 197 (8.81%) +7.17 | Kaya Cattouse | PUP | 1,014 | 43.33 | −5.85 |
| 2025 general election Electorate: 3,111; Turnout: 2,230 (75.22%) −12.48 | UDP hold Majority: 197 (8.81%) +7.17 | Jose Luis Espat | UDP | 20 | 0.85 | −49.97 |
| 2025 general election Electorate: 3,111; Turnout: 2,230 (75.22%) −12.48 | UDP hold Majority: 197 (8.81%) +7.17 | Cornelio Rogelio Galvez | PDM | 3 | 0.13 | - |
| 2020 general election Electorate: 2,886; Turnout: 2,531 (87.70%) +24.00 | UDP hold Majority: 41 (1.64%) −11.62 | Tracy Panton | UDP | 1,271 | 50.82 | -27.57 |
| 2020 general election Electorate: 2,886; Turnout: 2,531 (87.70%) +24.00 | UDP hold Majority: 41 (1.64%) −11.62 | Paul Thompson | PUP | 1,230 | 49.18 | +8.80 |
| 2015 general election Electorate: 3,468; Turnout: 2,209 (63.70%) +4.39 | UDP hold Majority: 293 (13.26%) +1.22 | Tracy Panton | UDP | 1,234 | 78.39 | +23.56 |
| 2015 general election Electorate: 3,468; Turnout: 2,209 (63.70%) +4.39 | UDP hold Majority: 293 (13.26%) +1.22 | Paul Thompson | PUP | 892 | 40.38 | −2.41 |
| 2015 general election Electorate: 3,468; Turnout: 2,209 (63.70%) +4.39 | UDP hold Majority: 293 (13.26%) +1.22 | Jose Luis Espat | BPP | 49 | 2.22 | - |
| 2012 general election Electorate: 3,180; Turnout: 1,886 (59.31%) −13.52 | UDP gain from PUP; Majority: 227 (12.04%) −14.9 | Herman Longsworth | UDP | 1,034 | 54.83 | +18.87 |
| 2012 general election Electorate: 3,180; Turnout: 1,886 (59.31%) −13.52 | UDP gain from PUP; Majority: 227 (12.04%) −14.9 | David Craig | PUP | 807 | 42.79 | −20.11 |
| 2008 general election Electorate: 3,242; Turnout: 2,361 (72.83%) −5.3 | PUP hold Majority: 636 (26.94%) −41.75 | Mark Espat | PUP | 1,485 | 62.9 | −19.93 |
| 2008 general election Electorate: 3,242; Turnout: 2,361 (72.83%) −5.3 | PUP hold Majority: 636 (26.94%) −41.75 | Tom Morrison | UDP | 849 | 35.96 | +21.82 |
| 2003 general election Electorate: 2,286; Turnout: 1,789 (78.13%) −12.66 | PUP hold Majority: 1,229 (68.69%) +27.05 | Mark Espat | PUP | 1,482 | 82.83 | +12.99 |
| 2003 general election Electorate: 2,286; Turnout: 1,789 (78.13%) −12.66 | PUP hold Majority: 1,229 (68.69%) +27.05 | Marilyn Williams | UDP | 253 | 14.14 | −14.06 |
| 2003 general election Electorate: 2,286; Turnout: 1,789 (78.13%) −12.66 | PUP hold Majority: 1,229 (68.69%) +27.05 | Sydney Fuller | Independent | 54 | 3.02 | - |
| 1998 general election Electorate: 1,738; Turnout: 1,578 (90.79%) +34.18 | PUP gain from NABR; Majority: 657 (41.64%) +28.44 | Mark Espat | PUP | 1,102 | 69.84 | +26.44 |
| 1998 general election Electorate: 1,738; Turnout: 1,578 (90.79%) +34.18 | PUP gain from NABR; Majority: 657 (41.64%) +28.44 | Tom Morrison | UDP | 445 | 28.2 | - |
| 1998 general election Electorate: 1,738; Turnout: 1,578 (90.79%) +34.18 | PUP gain from NABR; Majority: 657 (41.64%) +28.44 | Gilda Jo-Ann Lewis | NABR | 18 | 1.14 | −55.46 |
| 1998 general election Electorate: 1,738; Turnout: 1,578 (90.79%) +34.18 | PUP gain from NABR; Majority: 657 (41.64%) +28.44 | Ruth Patricia Smith | PDP | 4 | 0.25 | - |
| 1993 general election Electorate: 2,701; Turnout: 1,529 (56.61%) −1.77 | NABR hold Majority: 201 (13.2%) −4.8 | Philip Goldson | NABR | 865 | 56.6 | - |
| 1993 general election Electorate: 2,701; Turnout: 1,529 (56.61%) −1.77 | NABR hold Majority: 201 (13.2%) −4.8 | Roy Young | PUP | 664 | 43.4 | +3.3 |
| 1989 general election Electorate: 2,393; Turnout: 1,397 (58.38%) −4.97 | UDP hold Majority: 252 (18.0%) −21.0 | Philip Goldson | UDP | 812 | 58.1 | −11.0 |
| 1989 general election Electorate: 2,393; Turnout: 1,397 (58.38%) −4.97 | UDP hold Majority: 252 (18.0%) −21.0 | Roy Young | PUP | 560 | 40.1 | +10.0 |
| 1984 general election Electorate: 2,180; Turnout: 1,381 (63.35%) −24.73 | UDP hold Majority: 539 (39.0%) +28.5 | Philip Goldson | UDP | 954 | 69.1 | +14.4 |
| 1984 general election Electorate: 2,180; Turnout: 1,381 (63.35%) −24.73 | UDP hold Majority: 539 (39.0%) +28.5 | Rafael Chavez | PUP | 415 | 30.1 | −14.1 |
| 1979 general election Electorate: 3,474; Turnout: 3,060 (88.08%) +22.31 | UDP hold Majority: 10.5% (−9.2) | Philip Goldson | UDP | | 54.7 | −4.5 |
| 1979 general election Electorate: 3,474; Turnout: 3,060 (88.08%) +22.31 | UDP hold Majority: 10.5% (−9.2) | George Dakers | PUP | | 44.2 | +4.7 |
| 1974 general election Electorate: 2,375; Turnout: 1,562 (65.77%) −9.11 | UDP hold Majority: 19.7% (+4.9) | Philip Goldson | UDP | | 59.2 | - |
| 1974 general election Electorate: 2,375; Turnout: 1,562 (65.77%) −9.11 | UDP hold Majority: 19.7% (+4.9) | Joseph Gray | PUP | | 39.5 | −2.4 |
| 1969 general election Electorate: 2,544; Turnout: 1,905 (74.88%) +3.42 | NIP hold Majority: 14.8% (+3.4) | Philip Goldson | NIP | | 56.7 | +1.1 |
| 1969 general election Electorate: 2,544; Turnout: 1,905 (74.88%) +3.42 | NIP hold Majority: 14.8% (+3.4) | Joseph Gray | PUP | | 41.9 | −2.3 |
| 1965 general election Electorate: 3,577; Turnout: 2,556 (71.46%) −10.44 | NIP gain from PUP; Majority: 11.4% (+6.5) | Philip Goldson | NIP | | 55.6 | +36.9 |
| 1965 general election Electorate: 3,577; Turnout: 2,556 (71.46%) −10.44 | NIP gain from PUP; Majority: 11.4% (+6.5) | Frederick Westby | PUP | | 44.2 | +1.4 |
| 1961 general election Electorate: 2,424; Turnout: 2,058 (84.9%) n/a | PUP win Majority: 4.9% (n/a) | Frederick Westby | PUP | | 42.8 | - |
| 1961 general election Electorate: 2,424; Turnout: 2,058 (84.9%) n/a | PUP win Majority: 4.9% (n/a) | Nicholas Pollard | CDP | | 37.9 | - |
| 1961 general election Electorate: 2,424; Turnout: 2,058 (84.9%) n/a | PUP win Majority: 4.9% (n/a) | Floss Casasola | NIP | | 18.7 | - |

== See also ==
- Districts of Belize
- Constituencies of Belize
- Politics of Belize
- Belize
- Belize City
