= Frederick Hunter =

Frederic(k) Hunter may refer to

- Frederick Mercer Hunter (1844–1898), British colonial administrator
- Frederick Fraser Hunter (1876–1959), Canadian politician
- Frederic Hunter (1886–1926), English cricketer
- Newt Hunter (1880–1963), American first baseman, coach and scout in Major League Baseball
- Fred Hunter (Belize politician) (1927–2020)
