= 1965 British Honduras general election =

- 1 March 1965

All 18 seats in the Legislative Assembly 10 seats needed for a majority
- Registered: 37,860
- Turnout: 69.81% (▼9.69pp)
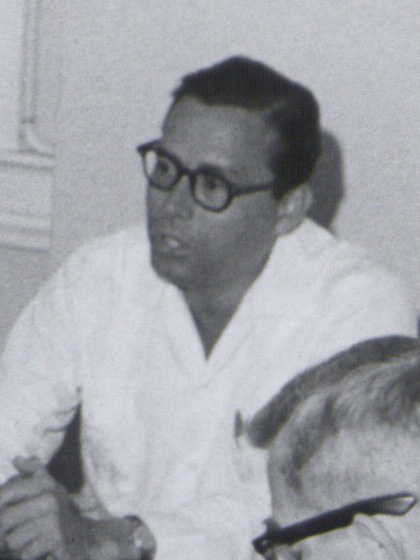

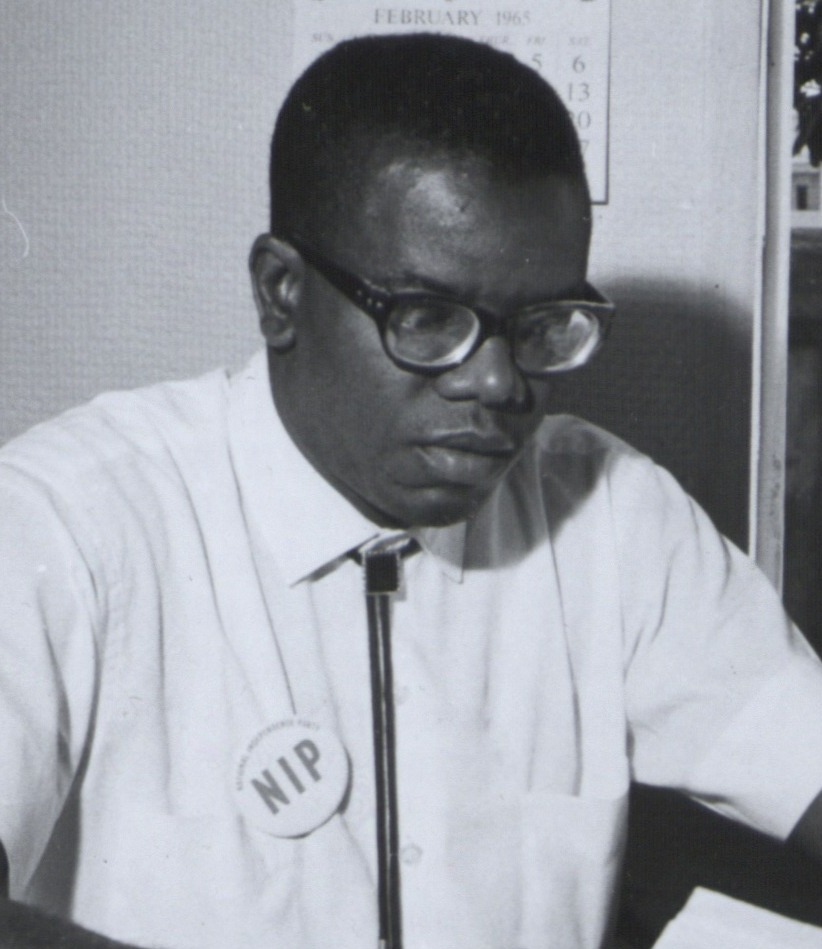
	First party	Second party
Leader	George Cadle Price	Philip Goldson
Party	PUP	NIP
Leader since	1956	1962
Leader's seat	Freetown	Albert
Last election	64.67%, 18 seats	23.63%, 0 seats
Seats won	16	2
Seat change	▼2	▲2
Popular vote	15,271	10,407
Percentage	59.07%	40.25%
- Results by constituency
Premier before election
George Cadle Price
PUP
Elected Premier
George Cadle Price
PUP

General elections were held in British Honduras (now Belize) on 1 March 1965. Belizeans elected 18 members to the British Honduras Legislative Assembly.

The ruling People's United Party (PUP) won 16 of 18 seats in the elections. However, the opposition National Independence Party entered the Legislative Assembly for the first time in the election, with party leader Philip Goldson winning in the Albert constituency and Edwin Morey winning in Toledo North.

== Results ==
Party	Votes	%	Seats	+/–
People's United Party	15,271	59.07	16	–2
National Independence Party	10,407	40.25	2	+2
Independents	176	0.68	0	0
Total	25,854	100.00	18	0
Valid votes	25,854	97.82		
Invalid/blank votes	577	2.18		
Total votes	26,431	100.00		
Registered voters/turnout	37,860	69.81		
Source: Elections and Boundaries Department

=== By division ===
Division	Electorate	Turnout	%	Political party	Candidate	Votes	%
Albert	3,577	2,556	71.5	National Independence Party	Philip Goldson		55.6
Albert	3,577	2,556	71.5	People's United Party	Frederick Westby		44.2
Belize Rural North	1,585	1,024	64.5	People's United Party	Fred Hunter		67.8
Belize Rural North	1,585	1,024	64.5	National Independence Party	Elwyn Pitts		28.2
Belize Rural South	1,229	770	62.7	People's United Party	Louis Sylvestre		70.3
Belize Rural South	1,229	770	62.7	National Independence Party	Phillip Gillett		26.9
Cayo North	1,886	1,343	71.2	People's United Party	Hector Silva		61.9
Cayo North	1,886	1,343	71.2	National Independence Party	Theodocio Ochoa		36.3
Cayo South	1,771	1,259	71.1	People's United Party	Santiago Perdomo		59.9
Cayo South	1,771	1,259	71.1	National Independence Party	Pedro Mena		36.5
Collet	3,850	2,670	69.4	People's United Party	Albert Cattouse		49.5
Collet	3,850	2,670	69.4	National Independence Party	Edward Flowers		48.5
Corozal North	1,797	1,232	68.6	People's United Party	Santiago Ricalde		70.4
Corozal North	1,797	1,232	68.6	National Independence Party	Gualberto Martinez Sr.		25.1
Corozal South	1,440	1,036	71.9	People's United Party	Florencio Marin		83.4
Corozal South	1,440	1,036	71.9	National Independence Party	Isidoro Castaneda		11.6
Fort George	1,767	1,271	71.9	People's United Party	Alexander Hunter		54.3
Fort George	1,767	1,271	71.9	National Independence Party	Helen Taylor		44.5
Freetown	2,898	1,980	68.3	People's United Party	George Cadle Price		60.1
Freetown	2,898	1,980	68.3	National Independence Party	Tharine Rudon		38.4
Mesopotamia	3,396	2,400	70.7	People's United Party	Lindbergh Rogers		52.2
Mesopotamia	3,396	2,400	70.7	National Independence Party	Colville Young		46.1
Orange Walk North	2,225	1,731	77.8	People's United Party	Elito Urbina		56.0
Orange Walk North	2,225	1,731	77.8	National Independence Party	Felipe Escalante		36.0
Orange Walk North	2,225	1,731	77.8	Independent	Victor Grellano		6.1
Orange Walk South	926	680	73.4	People's United Party	Guadalupe Pech		61.9
Orange Walk South	926	680	73.4	National Independence Party	Erlindo Leiva		14.7
Orange Walk South	926	680	73.4	Independent	Juan Blanco		10.3
Pickstock	2,172	1,494	68.8	People's United Party	Gwendolyn Lizarraga		68.3
Pickstock	2,172	1,494	68.8	National Independence Party	Jaime Staines		29.9
Stann Creek Rural	2,598	1,538	59.2	People's United Party	David McKoy		63.2
Stann Creek Rural	2,598	1,538	59.2	National Independence Party	Augustus Buller		33.1
Stann Creek Town	2,666	1,982	74.3	People's United Party	Allan Arthurs		50.0
Stann Creek Town	2,666	1,982	74.3	National Independence Party	Albert Arzu		48.3
Toledo North	793	556	70.1	National Independence Party	Edwin Morey		55.0
Toledo North	793	556	70.1	People's United Party	Samuel Vernon Jr.		41.5
Toledo South	1,284	909	70.8	People's United Party	Charles Martinez		50.4
Toledo South	1,284	909	70.8	National Independence Party	Charles Westby		47.5
