= List of House of Representatives constituencies of Belize =

House of Representatives of Belize

Type
- Type: lower house of the National Assembly (Belize)
- Term limits: 5 years
- Seats: 31

Elections
- Voting system: First past the post
- Last election: March 2025

Meeting place
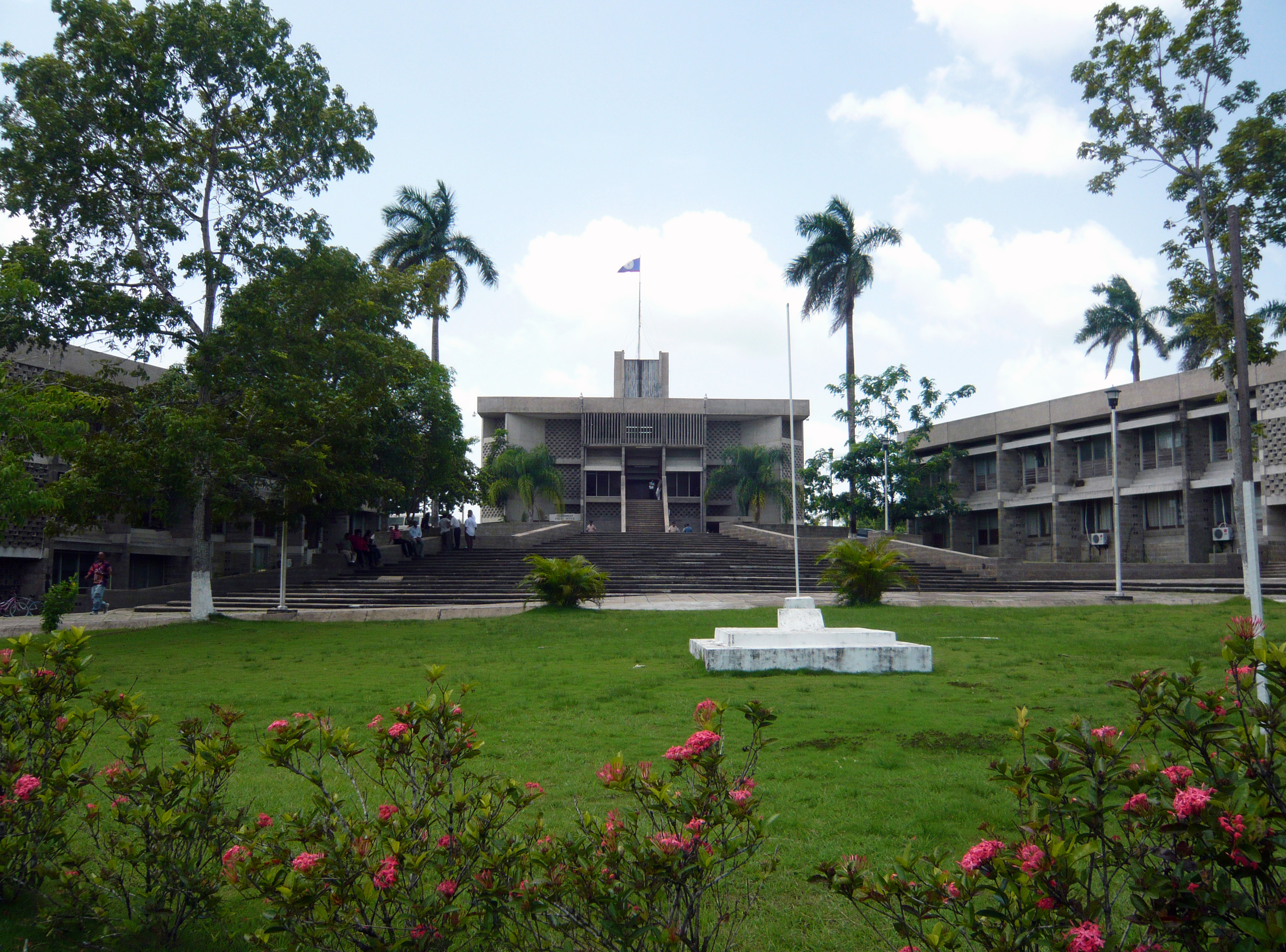
- National Assembly Building at Independence Hill, Belmopan, Belize

Website
- www.nationalassembly.gov.bz/house-of-representatives/

Location of Belize (red) in Central America

The House of Representatives of Belize is the lower house of the bicameral legislature of Belize, a country on the north-eastern coast of Central America. It was created under the 1981 constitution and is seated at Belmopan, the capital. The country has a two-party system dominated by the People's United Party and the United Democratic Party. The government has been formed by one of these parties after every election since independence.

Belize, then known as British Honduras, had a short lived Legislative Assembly from 1854 to 1871. This was reinstated in 1935 but was made up of only nominated members. Later, in 1954, the colony held its first general election for the assembly. British Honduras gained full self-government and a new constitution was passed in 1963. The Legislative Assembly was renamed to the National Assembly, which comprised two houses: the House of Representatives and the Senate. In 1981, Belize gained independence from the United Kingdom under a new constitution. The number of elected members of the House of Representatives increased from 18 to 28.

The constituencies of the House of Representatives are redistricted "from time to time" to ensure that their voting populations are as equal as possible, as required by the constitution. Since 2008, the country is divided into 31 single-member constituencies, each of which elects their representative for a five-year term under the first-past-the-post system. The minimum age for voting in Belize is 18, but voting is not compulsory. The next redistricting has been mandated by the Cabinet of Belize to take place by April 2026.

== History ==
Changes in the constituencies of the House of Representatives over time
Year	Event	Constituencies	Election(s)
1981	Belize gained its independence from the United Kingdom under a new constitution.	28	1984 and 1989
1993	Boundary redistricting. One constituency (Belize Rural Central) was added.	29	1993, 1998 and 2003
2004	Boundary redistricting. Two constituencies (Belmopan and Cayo North East) were added.	31	2008, 2012, 2015, 2020 and 2025

== Constituencies ==
Constituencies of Belize

Constituencies of the House of Representatives of Belize
#	Constituency	District	Electorate (2025)	First election
1	Albert	Belize	3,076	1961
2	Belize Rural Central	Belize	7,804	1993
3	Belize Rural North	Belize	5,486	1961
4	Belize Rural South	Belize	10,258	1961
5	Caribbean Shores	Belize	4,471	1984
6	Collet	Belize	3,748	1961
7	Fort George	Belize	2,646	1961
8	Freetown	Belize	4,134	1961
9	Lake Independence	Belize	6,941	1984
10	Mesopotamia	Belize	2,352	1961
11	Pickstock	Belize	4,796	1961
12	Port Loyola	Belize	4,910	1984
13	Queen's Square	Belize	2,802	1984
14	Belmopan	Cayo	10,613	2008
15	Cayo Central	Cayo	8,899	1984
16	Cayo North	Cayo	9,043	1961
17	Cayo North East	Cayo	6,679	2008
18	Cayo South	Cayo	8,702	1961
19	Cayo West	Cayo	7,814	1984
20	Corozal Bay	Corozal	6,808	1984
21	Corozal North	Corozal	7,626	1961
22	Corozal South East	Corozal	7,328	1984
23	Corozal South West	Corozal	6,547	1984
24	Orange Walk Central	Orange Walk	6,606	1984
25	Orange Walk East	Orange Walk	7,829	1984
26	Orange Walk North	Orange Walk	8,654	1961
27	Orange Walk South	Orange Walk	8,016	1961
28	Dangriga (Note: Dangriga was known as Stann Creek Town until the 1980s.)	Stann Creek	6,273	1961
29	Stann Creek West (Note: Stann Creek West was known as Stann Creek Rural until 1984.)	Stann Creek	10,814	1961
30	Toledo East	Toledo	8,876	1984
31	Toledo West	Toledo	8,014	1984
Overall			208,565	1984 (Note: Belize's had its first election after independence in 1984, but some of its constituencies have existed since before that as the assembly has been an elected body since 1954.)
