= Orange Walk Central =

Electoral constituency in Belize

- Constituency for the Belize House of Representatives
- District: Orange Walk

Current constituency
- Party: People's United Party
- Area Representative: Johnny Briceño

Orange Walk Central is an electoral constituency in the House of Representatives of the National Assembly of Belize. It is located in the Orange Walk District in northeastern Belize. It is currently represented by Johnny Briceño of the People's United Party (PUP), the current Prime Minister of Belize.

== Area representatives ==
Election	Area representative	Party
1984	Leliz Carballo	UDP
1989	Leopold Briceño	PUP
1993	Johnny Briceño	PUP
1998	Johnny Briceño	PUP
2003	Johnny Briceño	PUP
2008	Johnny Briceño	PUP
2012	Johnny Briceño	PUP
2015	Johnny Briceño	PUP
2020	Johnny Briceño	PUP
2025	Johnny Briceño	PUP

== Elections ==
Election	Political result	Candidate	Party	Votes	%	±%
2025 general election Electorate: 6,524; Turnout: 4,475 (68.59%) −16.72	PUP hold Majority: 2,579 (57.64 14.93%) +42.71	Johnny Briceno	PUP	3,416	76.34	+19.47
2025 general election Electorate: 6,524; Turnout: 4,475 (68.59%) −16.72	PUP hold Majority: 2,579 (57.64 14.93%) +42.71	Denni Cruz	UDP	837	18.70	−23.24
2025 general election Electorate: 6,524; Turnout: 4,475 (68.59%) −16.72	PUP hold Majority: 2,579 (57.64 14.93%) +42.71	Yara Cal Villeda	UDP	83	1.85	−40.09
