= 2012 Belizean general election =

- 7 March 2012

All 31 seats in the House of Representatives 16 seats needed for a majority
- Registered: 178,054
- Turnout: 73.18% (▼4.00pp)
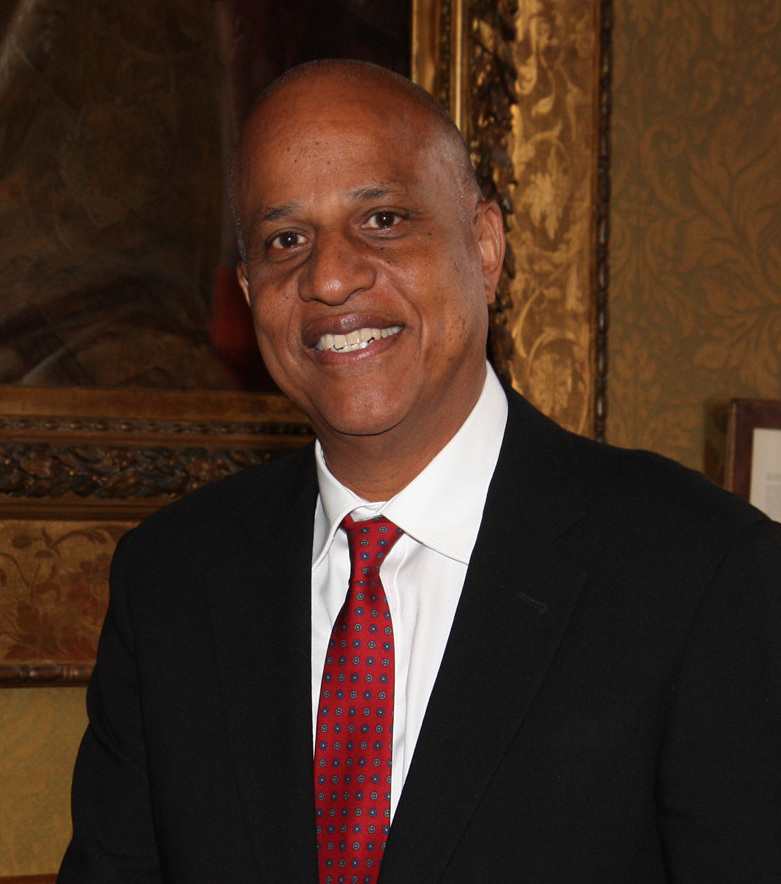

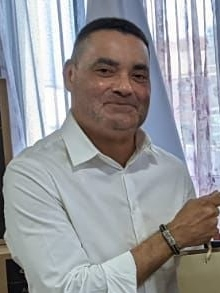
	First party	Second party
Leader	Dean Barrow	Francis Fonseca
Party	UDP	PUP
Leader's seat	Queen's Square	Freetown
Last election	56.61%, 25 seats	40.72%, 6 seats
Seats won	17	14
Seat change	▼8	▲8
Popular vote	64,976	61,832
Percentage	50.43%	47.99%
Swing	▼6.18 pp	▲7.27 pp
- Results by constituency
Prime Minister before election
Dean Barrow
UDP
Elected Prime Minister
Dean Barrow
UDP

General elections were held in Belize on 7 March 2012 to elect all 31 members of the Belize House of Representatives as well as offices in the various local governments. The election was run by the Elections and Boundaries Commission's Elections and Boundaries Department. Dean Barrow and his United Democratic Party (UDP) were re-elected, but lost eight seats to the opposition People's United Party (PUP) to maintain a slim 17-14 majority in the Belize House. The upper house of the Belize National Assembly, the Senate, was appointed after the election by the UDP-led government in accordance with the Constitution of Belize.

== Contesting parties ==
Prime Minister Dean Barrow's United Democratic Party (UDP) was the incumbent in the election with his party holding 25 seats at dissolution. The opposition People's United Party (PUP), led by Francis Fonseca since late 2011, held the other seats in the Belize House. An unrepresented coalition of smaller parties ran in nine of the 31 constituencies under the banner of the Belize Unity Alliance.

== Campaign ==
The UDP's primary campaign promise was to renegotiate the terms of a US$550 million bond repayment, which Barrow said would be his first task if re-elected. The bond accounted for 40% of Belize's economic output and half of the national debt, making Belize the 13th most indebted state in the world in 2012. The interest on the debt was scheduled to cost US$46 million in the year, which was 12% of the country's revenues at the time affected its ability to raise future funds after credit rating agencies downgraded the sovereign credit status to "junk." Conversely, Fonseca said that he would abide by the obligation to pay off the debt with promises to grow the country's current US$1.25 billion economy.

Another campaign theme was the issue of oil drilling off the coast of the country within proximity of the Belize Barrier Reef after Belize started exporting oil in 2006. However, opinion polls showed opposition to further oil exploration. Barrow promised to hold a referendum on the issue, while Fonseca pledged a moratorium over continued exploration.

The Belize Unity Alliance actively campaigned in such locales as San Pedro, the biggest town on Ambergris Caye, off the Belize coast, supporting independent candidates and calling for votes for the party. However, the coalition failed to make significant inroads and was not competitive in any of the 31 Belize House constituencies under the country's first past the post electoral system.

=== Unofficial referendum ===
On 29 February, Oceana, a member of the Belize Coalition to Save Our National Heritage, held an informal referendum that they called the "People's Referendum". The "referendum" consisted of 51 polling stations, including two mobile polling stations, staffed by volunteers over the issue of oil drilling. A previous attempt to hold the referendum alongside the election was rejected after 40% of the petitioned signatures were disqualified due to double signatories and mismatched names with the official voter rolls. The voter turnout was 28,000. The group's vice president, Audrey Matura-Shepherd, said that the referendum sought to use "the law to force the government to hear the people."

== Opinion polls ==
Opinion polls suggested a tight race with many undecided voters.

A poll conducted on 17 February 2012, the day of nominations for running in the election by former politician Derek Aikman, showed that the UDP held a majority of 16 seats and the PUP leading in nine seats, including Orange Walk Central, which they had won in the last poll; Fort George, Pickstock, Belize Rural South, Corozal Southeast, Corozal Bay, Cayo North, Cayo West, and Orange Walk North. The UDP led in Queen's Square, Port Loyola, Caribbean Shores, Mesopotamia, Collet, Lake Independence, Corozal North, Belmopan, Cayo Northeast, Cayo Central, and Orange Walk South. The other seats that could play the role of kingmaker included Albert, Freetown, Belize Rural North and Central, Dangriga and Stann Creek West, Toledo East and West, Corozal Southwest, Cayo South and Orange Walk East.

Another poll by Aikman on 2 March showed a large lead for the UDP, though many voters were willing to support PUP. The poll was of 8,847 voters, or 4.97%. The UDP's 15% lead in the nomination day poll fell to a 4% gap with a lead of 30% to 26% on 2 March. The BUA also recorded 1% support in the Belize Rural South and Belmopan. Undecided voters were at 43%.

== Conduct ==
An Organization of American States (OAS) monitoring group observed the poll. The team was led by the former US Ambassador to Honduras Frank Almaguer; the team also comprised observers from Antigua and Barbuda, Argentina, Barbados, Canada, Chile, Colombia, Guyana, Martinique, Mexico, the United States and Venezuela. The Organization of American States Electoral Observation Mission (OAS/EOM) was present in all six districts. Afterwards the election was praised by the OAS as an "exemplary practice for the region."

== Results ==
The total number of eligible voters was 178,054, out of a population of just over 300,000. There were 74 total candidates and 320 polling stations. For the simultaneous local elections, 97,979 of the voters had the choice to choose from 170 candidates at 168 of the polling stations.

The UDP did well in Belize City, holding all of their constituencies there as well as picking up Lake Independence and Albert. However the PUP made significant gains in the rural constituencies, especially in the south where they swept the constituencies in the Stann Creek and Toledo Districts.

Party	Votes	%	Seats	+/–
United Democratic Party	64,976	50.43	17	–8
People's United Party	61,832	47.99	14	+8
People's National Party	828	0.64	0	0
Vision Inspired by the People	382	0.30	0	0
Independents	822	0.64	0	0
Total	128,840	100.00	31	0
Valid votes	128,840	98.88		
Invalid/blank votes	1,463	1.12		
Total votes	130,303	100.00		
Registered voters/turnout	178,054	73.18		
Source: Elections and Boundaries Department

=== By constituency ===
Division	Electorate	Turnout	%	Candidate	Party	Votes	%
Albert	3,180	1,886	59.31	Herman R. Longsworth	United Democratic Party	1,034	54.83
Albert	3,180	1,886	59.31	David Craig	People's United Party	807	42.79
Albert	3,180	1,886	59.31	Rejected votes		45	2.39
Belize Rural Central	5,920	3,917	66.17	Dolores Balderamos-García	People's United Party	2,005	51.19
Belize Rural Central	5,920	3,917	66.17	Michael "Hutchy" Hutchinson	United Democratic Party	1,801	45.98
Belize Rural Central	5,920	3,917	66.17	Fred Hunter Sr.	People's National Party	74	1.89
Belize Rural Central	5,920	3,917	66.17	Rejected votes		37	0.94
Belize Rural North	5,404	3,770	69.76	Edmond Castro	United Democratic Party	2,103	55.78
Belize Rural North	5,404	3,770	69.76	Arthur Saldivar	People's United Party	1,568	41.59
Belize Rural North	5,404	3,770	69.76	Rufus X	People's National Party	49	1.30
Belize Rural North	5,404	3,770	69.76	Rejected votes		10	0.27
Belize Rural South	7,100	4,861	68.46	Jose Manuel "Junior" Heredia	United Democratic Party	2,479	51.00
Belize Rural South	7,100	4,861	68.46	Patty Arceo	People's United Party	2,026	41.68
Belize Rural South	7,100	4,861	68.46	"Bobby" Robert Lopez	Vision Inspired by the People	332	6.83
Belize Rural South	7,100	4,861	68.46	William "Mike" Campbell	Independent	24	0.49
Belize Rural South	7,100	4,861	68.46	Rejected votes		126	2.59
Belmopan	7,780	5,603	72.02	John B. Saldivar	United Democratic Party	2,775	49.53
Belmopan	7,780	5,603	72.02	Amin Hegar	People's United Party	2,557	45.64
Belmopan	7,780	5,603	72.02	Richard Smith	People's National Party	230	4.10
Belmopan	7,780	5,603	72.02	Rejected votes		41	0.73
Caribbean Shores	5,117	3,363	65.72	Santino "Santi" Castillo	United Democratic Party	2,001	59.50
Caribbean Shores	5,117	3,363	65.72	David Hoy	People's United Party	1,325	39.40
Caribbean Shores	5,117	3,363	65.72	Rejected votes		37	1.10
Cayo Central	7,180	5,900	82.17	Rene Montero	United Democratic Party	2,522	42.75
Cayo Central	7,180	5,900	82.17	Collet Emmanuel Montejo	People's United Party	2,478	42.00
Cayo Central	7,180	5,900	82.17	Rejected votes		72	1.22
Cayo North	6,213	4,641	74.70	Joseph Mahmud	People's United Party	2,382	51.33
Cayo North	6,213	4,641	74.70	Salvador Fernandez	United Democratic Party	1,985	42.77
Cayo North	6,213	4,641	74.70	Marcel Bedran	Independent	191	4.12
Cayo North	6,213	4,641	74.70	Rejected votes		83	1.79
Cayo North East	5,548	4,122	74.30	Elvin Penner	United Democratic Party	2,051	49.76
Cayo North East	5,548	4,122	74.30	Orlando "Landy" Habet	People's United Party	2,034	49.34
Cayo North East	5,548	4,122	74.30	Rejected votes		37	0.90
Cayo South	6,905	4,677	67.73	Julius Espat	People's United Party	2,568	54.91
Cayo South	6,905	4,677	67.73	Ramon Francisco Witz	United Democratic Party	2,109	45.09
Cayo South	6,905	4,677	67.73	Rejected votes		0	0.00
Cayo West	6,351	4,898	77.12	Erwin Rafael Contreras	United Democratic Party	3,079	62.86
Cayo West	6,351	4,898	77.12	Oscar Sabido	People's United Party	1,745	35.63
Cayo West	6,351	4,898	77.12	Rejected votes		74	1.51
Collet	4,627	3,046	65.83	Patrick Jason Faber	United Democratic Party	1,949	63.99
Collet	4,627	3,046	65.83	Carolyn Trench-Sandiford	People's United Party	1,060	34.80
Collet	4,627	3,046	65.83	Rejected votes		37	1.21
Corozal Bay	6,237	4,652	74.59	Pablo Marin	United Democratic Party	2,340	50.30
Corozal Bay	6,237	4,652	74.59	Gregorio "Papas" Garcia	People's United Party	2,192	47.12
Corozal Bay	6,237	4,652	74.59	Carlos Javier Sawers	Vision Inspired by the People	50	1.07
Corozal Bay	6,237	4,652	74.59	Rejected votes		70	1.50
Corozal North	6,233	5,152	82.66	Hugo Amilcar Patt	United Democratic Party	2,673	51.88
Corozal North	6,233	5,152	82.66	Valdemar Isidro Castillo	People's United Party	2,464	47.83
Corozal North	6,233	5,152	82.66	Rejected votes		15	0.29
Corozal South East	6,549	5,609	85.65	Florencio Julian Marin, Jr.	People's United Party	2,999	53.47
Corozal South East	6,549	5,609	85.65	Raul Fabian Rosado	United Democratic Party	2,587	46.12
Corozal South East	6,549	5,609	85.65	Rejected votes		23	0.41
Corozal South West	5,745	4,674	81.36	Ramiro Ramirez	People's United Party	2,153	46.06
Corozal South West	5,745	4,674	81.36	Gabriel Alberto Martinez	United Democratic Party	2,120	45.36
Corozal South West	5,745	4,674	81.36	Angel Roberto Campos	Independent	384	8.22
Corozal South West	5,745	4,674	81.36	Rejected votes		17	0.36
Dangriga	5,904	3,827	64.82	Ivan Michael Ramos	People's United Party	2,036	53.20
Dangriga	5,904	3,827	64.82	Arthur William "Turo" Roches	United Democratic Party	1,699	44.40
Dangriga	5,904	3,827	64.82	Mateo Tomas Polanco	People's National Party	37	0.97
Dangriga	5,904	3,827	64.82	Rejected votes		56	1.46
Fort George	3,133	1,941	61.95	Said Musa	People's United Party	1,202	61.93
Fort George	3,133	1,941	61.95	George Gough	United Democratic Party	715	36.84
Fort George	3,133	1,941	61.95	Rejected votes		24	1.24
Freetown	4,230	2,999	70.90	Francis W. Fonseca	People's United Party	1,558	51.95
Freetown	4,230	2,999	70.90	Lee Mark Chang	United Democratic Party	1,408	46.95
Freetown	4,230	2,999	70.90	Rejected votes		33	1.10
Lake Independence	5,145	3,139	61	Mark Anthony King	United Democratic Party	1,544	49.19
Lake Independence	5,145	3,139	61	Martin Galvez	People's United Party	1,372	43.71
Lake Independence	5,145	3,139	61	Carlos A. Diaz	Independent	223	7.10
Lake Independence	5,145	3,139	61	Rejected votes		0	0.00
Mesopotamia	3,710	2,256	60.81	Michael Finnegan	United Democratic Party	1,841	81.60
Mesopotamia	3,710	2,256	60.81	Philip Palacio	People's United Party	380	16.84
Mesopotamia	3,710	2,256	60.81	Rejected votes		35	1.55
Orange Walk Central	6,694	5,198	77.65	Juan Antonio "Johnny" Briceño	People's United Party	3,042	58.52
Orange Walk Central	6,694	5,198	77.65	Denny Grijalva	United Democratic Party	2,156	41.48
Orange Walk Central	6,694	5,198	77.65	Rejected votes		0	0.00
Orange Walk East	6,917	5,257	76.00	Marco Tulio Mendez	People's United Party	2,761	52.52
Orange Walk East	6,917	5,257	76.00	Orlando Alexander Burns	United Democratic Party	2,496	47.48
Orange Walk East	6,917	5,257	76.00	Rejected votes		42	0.80
Orange Walk North	7,061	5,822	82.45	Gaspar "Gapi" Vega	United Democratic Party	3,405	58.49
Orange Walk North	7,061	5,822	82.45	Jorge Alberto "George" Briceno	People's United Party	2,357	40.48
Orange Walk North	7,061	5,822	82.45	Rejected votes		60	1.03
Orange Walk South	6,837	5,621	82.21	Jose Abelardo Mai	People's United Party	2,968	52.80
Orange Walk South	6,837	5,621	82.21	Rosendo "Chendo" Urbina	United Democratic Party	2,605	46.34
Orange Walk South	6,837	5,621	82.21	Rejected votes		48	0.85
Pickstock	3,243	1,994	61.49	Wilfred "Sedi" Elrington	United Democratic Party	1,038	52.06
Pickstock	3,243	1,994	61.49	Francis Donald Smith	People's United Party	956	47.94
Pickstock	3,243	1,994	61.49	Rejected votes		37	1.86
Port Loyola	4,469	2,830	63.33	Anthony "Boots" Martinez	United Democratic Party	1,789	63.22
Port Loyola	4,469	2,830	63.33	Gilroy Usher, Sr.	People's United Party	990	34.98
Port Loyola	4,469	2,830	63.33	Rejected votes		51	1.80
Queen's Square	3,960	2,577	65.08	Dean Oliver Barrow	United Democratic Party	2,039	79.12
Queen's Square	3,960	2,577	65.08	Anthony Glenford Sylvestre, Jr.	People's United Party	490	19.01
Queen's Square	3,960	2,577	65.08	Rejected votes		48	1.86
Stann Creek West	7,888	6,123	77.62	Rodwell Ferguson	People's United Party	3,272	53.44
Stann Creek West	7,888	6,123	77.62	Melvin Hulse	United Democratic Party	2,698	44.06
Stann Creek West	7,888	6,123	77.62	Charles Berisford Leslie Jr.	People's National Party	127	2.07
Stann Creek West	7,888	6,123	77.62	Rejected votes		26	0.42
Toledo East	6,640	4,835	72.82	Michael Joseph Espat	People's United Party	2,417	49.99
Toledo East	6,640	4,835	72.82	Peter Eden Martinez	United Democratic Party	2,077	42.96
Toledo East	6,640	4,835	72.82	William Wil Maheia	People's National Party	282	5.83
Toledo East	6,640	4,835	72.82	Rejected votes		59	1.22
Toledo West	6,134	5,068	82.62	Oscar Requena	People's United Party	3,165	62.45
Toledo West	6,134	5,068	82.62	Juan Coy	United Democratic Party	1,858	36.66
Toledo West	6,134	5,068	82.62	Martin Ack	People's National Party	29	0.57
Toledo West	6,134	5,068	82.62	Rejected votes		16	0.32

== Reactions ==
Domestic

Dean Barrow reacted to the victory by assuring the public that he would quickly appoint a delegation to renegotiate the terms of the so-called superbond with foreign financiers. Analysts at JP Morgan and Nomura Securities have estimated the government's chances of obtaining more favourable repayment terms after the positive completion of the electoral process. According to Nomura Securities analyst Boris Segura, the bond's interest could be reduced to 5% and the maturity extended to 2042. He also announced that he would approach Venezuelan leader Hugo Chávez to supply Belize with low-cost petroleum products. He cited this as in accordance with his self-declared pro-poor agenda and efforts to lower living costs.

PUP's Francis Fonseca had not conceded defeat the following day after the release of the official result. PUP claimed there were irregularities and filed a complaint against the result in three constituencies.

International

The OAS/EOM noted several issues during the campaign and voting process, such as the deployment of public resources, including government vehicles and drivers, for the use of the ruling party. They also claimed to have seen cases of vote buying. Though they praised the peaceful election procedure, the professionalism of the polling officials and the adequate representation of women in the process. Faced with the poll-watchers' report, Barrow recognised that though the election had not been perfect, but insisted that in an overall view it could be considered free and fair.
