= Edmond Castro =

Belizean politician

Member of the Belize House of Representatives for Belize Rural North
- In office 7 February 2008 – 12 November 2020
- Preceded by: Maxwell Samuels
- Succeeded by: Marconi Leal

Personal details
- Party: United Democratic Party

Edmond George Castro is a Belizean politician. He represented the Belize Rural North constituency in the Belize House from 2008 to 2020. A member of the United Democratic Party, he also served as Minister of National Emergency Management in Belize.
