= 1989 Belizean general election =

General election held in Belize

- 4 September 1989

All 28 seats in the House of Representatives 15 seats needed for a majority
- Registered: 82,556
- Turnout: 72.62% (▼2.34pp)
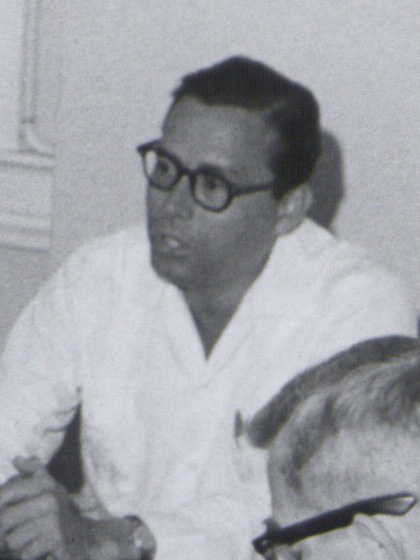

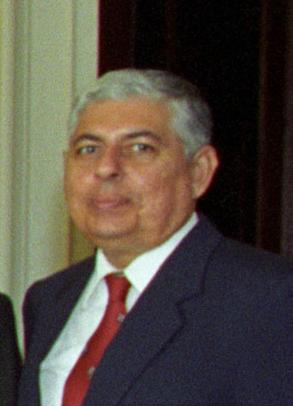
	First party	Second party
Leader	George Cadle Price	Manuel Esquivel
Party	PUP	UDP
Leader since	1956	1983
Leader's seat	Pickstock	Caribbean Shores
Last election	44.00%, 7 seats	54.07%, 21 seats
Seats won	15	13
Seat change	▲8	▼8
Popular vote	29,986	28,900
Percentage	50.87%	49.02%
Swing	▲6.87 pp	▼5.05 pp
- Popular vote by constituency. As Belize uses the FPTP electoral system, seat totals are not determined by popular vote, but instead via results by each constituency
Prime Minister before election
Manuel Esquivel
UDP
Subsequent Prime Minister
George Cadle Price
PUP

General elections were held in Belize on 4 September 1989. The result was a narrow victory for the People's United Party, which won 15 of the 28 seats. The United Democratic Party lost its supermajority, moving into opposition. Voter turnout was 72.6%.

== Background ==
The ruling United Democratic Party was finishing its first term and sought re-election on the basis of improved economic indicators and standard of living. The People's United Party painted them as lusting after foreign aid and recognition, particularly from the United States and Taiwan.

Another issue was national security; the PUP attacked a CIA-like operation known as the Secret Intelligence Service as being a spy network for the UDP and promised freedom of the press and other fundamental freedoms enshrined in the constitution.

Longtime PUP leader George Cadle Price returned to both the House of Representatives and as prime minister after his surprise ouster in the 1984 election, winning the Pickstock constituency in the Belize District.

== Results ==
Party	Votes	%	Seats	+/–
People's United Party	29,986	50.87	15	+8
United Democratic Party	28,900	49.02	13	–8
Independents	65	0.11	0	0
Total	58,951	100.00	28	0
Valid votes	58,951	98.33		
Invalid/blank votes	1,003	1.67		
Total votes	59,954	100.00		
Registered voters/turnout	82,556	72.62		
Source: Elections and Boundaries Department

=== By constituency ===
Division	Electorate	Turnout	%	Candidate	Party	Votes	%
Caribbean Shores	2,779	1,745	62.7	Manuel Esquivel	United Democratic Party	957	54.8
Caribbean Shores	2,779	1,745	62.7	Louis Humphreys	People's United Party	775	44.4
Freetown	2,771	1,774	64.0	Derek Aikman	United Democratic Party	961	54.2
Freetown	2,771	1,774	64.0	Araceli "Lita" Hunter Krohn	People's United Party	783	44.1
Pickstock	2,453	1,514	61.7	George Cadle Price	People's United Party	906	59.8
Pickstock	2,453	1,514	61.7	Cyril Davis	United Democratic Party	584	34.5
Fort George	2,833	1,780	62.8	Said Musa	People's United Party	1,105	62.0
Fort George	2,833	1,780	62.8	Dean Lindo	United Democratic Party	656	36.8
Lake Independence	3,376	2,115	62.6	Carlos Diaz	People's United Party	1,091	51.5
Lake Independence	3,376	2,115	62.6	Hubert Elrington	United Democratic Party	978	46.2
Albert	2,393	1,397	58.0	Phillip Goldson	United Democratic Party	812	58.1
Albert	2,393	1,397	58.0	Roy Young	People's United Party	560	40.0
Collet	2,656	1,616	60.8	Remijio Montejo	People's United Party	940	58.2
Collet	2,656	1,616	60.8	Frank Lizama	United Democratic Party	661	40.9
Mesopotamia	2,818	1,570	55.7	Curl Thompson	United Democratic Party	834	53.1
Mesopotamia	2,818	1,570	55.7	Stephen Latchman	People's United Party	713	45.4
Queen's Square	2,896	1,697	58.5	Dean Barrow	United Democratic Party	1,085	63.9
Queen's Square	2,896	1,697	58.5	Tom Greenwood	People's United Party	588	34.6
Port Loyola	3,002	1,759	58.5	Henry Young	United Democratic Party	991	56.3
Port Loyola	3,002	1,759	58.5	Ernest Staine	People's United Party	695	39.5
Belize Rural North	2,469	1,653	66.9	Samuel Rhaburn	United Democratic Party	806	48.8
Belize Rural North	2,469	1,653	66.9	Ewing Maxwell Samuels	People's United Party	760	45.9
Belize Rural North	2,469	1,653	66.9	Rufus X	Independent	65	3.9
Belize Rural South	3,350	2,297	68.5	Glenn Godfrey	People's United Party	1489	64.8
Belize Rural South	3,350	2,297	68.5	Rudolph Thompson	United Democratic Party	762	33.2
Orange Walk North	2,982	2,641	88.5	Ruben Campos	United Democratic Party	1338	50.6
Orange Walk North	2,982	2,641	88.5	Santiago Rosado	People's United Party	1,256	47.5
Orange Walk Central	2,717	2,170	79.8	Leopoldo Briceno	People's United Party	1144	52.7
Orange Walk Central	2,717	2,170	79.8	Leliz Carballo	United Democratic Party	1,010	46.5
Orange Walk East	3,264	2,706	82.9	Elodio Aragon	United Democratic Party	1464	54.1
Orange Walk East	3,264	2,706	82.9	Ramon Cervantes	People's United Party	1195	44.2
Orange Walk South	3,057	2,743	81.7	Guadalupe Pech	People's United Party	1,378	50.2
Orange Walk South	3,057	2,743	81.7	Onesimo Pech	United Democratic Party	1,331	48.5
Cayo North	3,751	2,951	78.6	Salvador Fernandez	United Democratic Party	1,562	52.9
Cayo North	3,751	2,951	78.6	Ismael "Miley" Garcia	People's United Party	1,321	44.8
Cayo South	3,199	2,382	74.0	Samuel Waight	People's United Party	1,425	59.8
Cayo South	3,199	2,382	74.0	Philip Brackett	United Democratic Party	910	38.2
Cayo West	2,539	2,010	79.0	Miguel Ruiz	People's United Party	1,033	51.3
Cayo West	2,539	2,010	79.0	Carlos Leon	United Democratic Party	929	46.2
Cayo Central	3,249	2,491	76.6	Daniel Silva	People's United Party	1,277	51.2
Cayo Central	3,249	2,491	76.6	Eduardo "Dito" Juan	United Democratic Party	1,152	46.2
Corozal North	2,922	2,522	86.3	Valdemar Castillo	People's United Party	1,371	54.4
Corozal North	2,922	2,522	86.3	Richard Quan	United Democratic Party	1,119	44.4
Corozal South West	2,821	2,398	85.0	Asterio Ortega	United Democratic Party	1,309	54.6
Corozal South West	2,821	2,398	85.0	Everaldo Puck	People's United Party	1,055	43.9
Corozal Bay	3,336	2,544	76.0	Juan Vildo Marin	People's United Party	1,258	50.5
Corozal Bay	3,336	2,544	76.0	Israel Alpuche	United Democratic Party	1,201	47.2
Corozal South East	3,203	2,887	90.0	Florencio Marin	People's United Party	1,528	52.9
Corozal South East	3,203	2,887	90.0	Doroteo Pott	United Democratic Party	1,320	45.7
Dangriga	3,486	2,330	66.8	Theodore Aranda	People's United Party	1,233	52.9
Dangriga	3,486	2,330	66.8	Randolph Enriquez	United Democratic Party	1,057	45.4
Stann Creek West	2,286	1,783	77.9	Melvin Hulse	United Democratic Party	881	49.4
Stann Creek West	2,286	1,783	77.9	Conrad Lewis	People's United Party	871	48.8
Toledo East	3,375	2,494	73.8	Michael Espat	People's United Party	1,298	52.0
Toledo East	3,375	2,494	73.8	Charles Wagner	United Democratic Party	1,168	46.8
Toledo West	2,573	1,985	53.5	William "Dennis" Usher	United Democratic Party	1,062	53.5
Toledo West	2,573	1,985	53.5	Samuel Alexander "Alejandro" Vernon	People's United Party	911	45.9
Source: Belize Times
