= 2003 Belizean municipal elections =

A series of municipal elections were held on March 5, 2003, to elect City and Town Councils in the Cities of Belize and Belmopan and the towns of Corozal, Orange Walk, San Pedro, San Ignacio/Santa Elena, Dangriga and Punta Gorda. 142 candidates ran in this election, of whom 25% were women.

This election was the first to be held on the same day as a general election, although general and municipal elections have been held in the same year.

The ruling People's United Party (PUP) won 47 of a possible 67 seats, with the UDP winning the remaining 20.

== Major party preparations ==
Beginning with the 1997 City Council elections, municipal elections have generally been called in March every three years. Even before then the majority of local and national elections were held in March or April.
