= 1961 British Honduras general election =

- 26 March 1961

All 18 seats in the Legislative Assembly 10 seats needed for a majority
- Registered: 27,714
- Turnout: 79.50% (▲26.76pp)
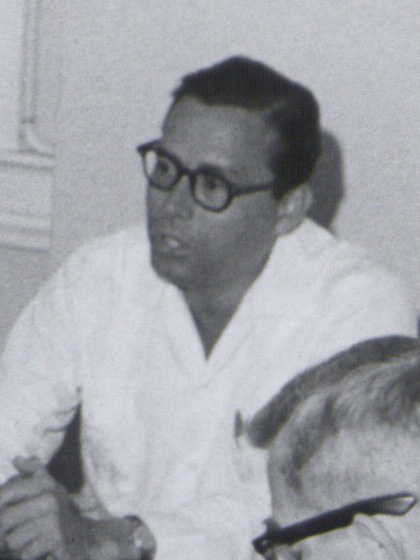
| | First party |
|---|---|
| Leader | George Cadle Price |
| Party | PUP |
| Leader since | 1956 |
| Leader's seat | Freetown |
| Last election | 61.32%, 9 seats |
| Seats won | 18 |
| Seat change | ▲9 |
| Popular vote | 13,975 |
| Percentage | 64.67% |
| Swing | ▲3.35 pp |
- Popular vote by constituency. As Belize uses the FPTP electoral system, seat totals are not determined by popular vote, but instead via results by each constituency
First Minister before election
George Cadle Price
PUP
Elected First Minister
George Cadle Price
PUP

General elections were held in British Honduras on 26 March 1961. They were the first following a constitutional review, which had increased the number of elected seats from 9 to 18, whilst a further five members would be appointed by the Governor and two would be officials. The result was a victory for the ruling People's United Party, which won all 18 seats.

The National Independence Party, founded in 1958 by a merger of the two previous major opposition parties, the Honduran Independence Party and the National Party, contested general elections for the first time in 1961. A third party formed by former PUP and NP members, the Christian Democratic Party, also fielded candidates. Both parties failed to win seats.

== Results ==
| Party | Votes | % | Seats | +/– |
|---|---|---|---|---|
| People's United Party | 13,975 | 64.67 | 18 | +9 |
| National Independence Party | 5,107 | 23.63 | 0 | 0 |
| Christian Democratic Party | 2,514 | 11.63 | 0 | New |
| Independents | 15 | 0.07 | 0 | 0 |
| Total | 21,611 | 100.00 | 18 | +9 |
| Valid votes | 21,611 | 98.08 | | |
| Invalid/blank votes | 422 | 1.92 | | |
| Total votes | 22,033 | 100.00 | | |
| Registered voters/turnout | 27,714 | 79.50 | | |
Source: Elections and Boundaries Department

=== By division ===
| Division | Electorate | Turnout | % | Political party | Candidate | Votes | % |
|---|---|---|---|---|---|---|---|
| Albert | 2,424 | 2,058 | 84.9 | People's United Party | Frederick Westby | | 42.8 |
| Albert | 2,424 | 2,058 | 84.9 | Christian Democratic Party | Nicholas Pollard | | 37.9 |
| Albert | 2,424 | 2,058 | 84.9 | National Independence Party | Floss Casasola | | 18.7 |
| Belize Rural North | 1,406 | 1,041 | 74.0 | People's United Party | Fred Hunter | | 62.2 |
| Belize Rural North | 1,406 | 1,041 | 74.0 | Christian Democratic Party | Arthur Wade | | 25.4 |
| Belize Rural North | 1,406 | 1,041 | 74.0 | National Independence Party | Marcelo Casasola | | 10.3 |
| Belize Rural South | 1,052 | 781 | 74.2 | People's United Party | Louis Sylvestre | | 81.3 |
| Belize Rural South | 1,052 | 781 | 74.2 | National Independence Party | Todd Brown | | 15.6 |
| Cayo North | 1,292 | 1,042 | 80.7 | People's United Party | Hector Silva | | 70.5 |
| Cayo North | 1,292 | 1,042 | 80.7 | National Independence Party | Manuel Figueroa | | 27.0 |
| Cayo South | 1,174 | 962 | 81.9 | People's United Party | Santiago Perdomo | | 61.3 |
| Cayo South | 1,174 | 962 | 81.9 | Christian Democratic Party | Eduardo Espat | | 30.0 |
| Cayo South | 1,174 | 962 | 81.9 | National Independence Party | Pedro Mena | | 5.8 |
| Collet | 2,706 | 2,168 | 80.1 | People's United Party | Albert Cattouse | | 44.6 |
| Collet | 2,706 | 2,168 | 80.1 | National Independence Party | Edward Flowers | | 43.9 |
| Collet | 2,706 | 2,168 | 80.1 | Christian Democratic Party | Mervin Hulse | | 9.3 |
| Corozal North | 1,473 | 1,141 | 77.5 | People's United Party | Santiago Ricalde | | 79.9 |
| Corozal North | 1,473 | 1,141 | 77.5 | National Independence Party | Gualberto Martinez | | 18.1 |
| Corozal South | 1,480 | 956 | 64.6 | People's United Party | Jesus Ken | | 85.7 |
| Corozal South | 1,480 | 956 | 64.6 | National Independence Party | Victor Greenwood | | 10.5 |
| Fort George | 1,422 | 1,225 | 86.1 | People's United Party | Alexander Hunter | | 60.2 |
| Fort George | 1,422 | 1,225 | 86.1 | National Independence Party | Herbert Fuller | | 28.5 |
| Fort George | 1,422 | 1,225 | 86.1 | Christian Democratic Party | Denbigh Jeffery | | 10.8 |
| Freetown | 1,850 | 1,625 | 87.8 | People's United Party | George Cadle Price | | 67.1 |
| Freetown | 1,850 | 1,625 | 87.8 | National Independence Party | Sabino Savery | | 24.8 |
| Freetown | 1,850 | 1,625 | 87.8 | Christian Democratic Party | Erenst Cain | | 7.6 |
| Mesopotamia | 2,501 | 1,993 | 79.7 | People's United Party | C. L. B. Rogers | | 62.4 |
| Mesopotamia | 2,501 | 1,993 | 79.7 | National Independence Party | Erlean Casasola | | 28.4 |
| Mesopotamia | 2,501 | 1,993 | 79.7 | Christian Democratic Party | Edward Usher | | 8.6 |
| Orange Walk North | 1,377 | 1,089 | 79.1 | People's United Party | Victor Orellana | | 57.6 |
| Orange Walk North | 1,377 | 1,089 | 79.1 | National Independence Party | Eloy Escalante | | 40.7 |
| Orange Walk South | 926 | 680 | 73.4 | People's United Party | Guadalupe Pech | | 81.4 |
| Orange Walk South | 926 | 680 | 73.4 | National Independence Party | Ignacio Vega | | 14.4 |
| Pickstock | 1,680 | 1,418 | 84.4 | People's United Party | Gwendolyn Lizarraga | | 68.6 |
| Pickstock | 1,680 | 1,418 | 84.4 | National Independence Party | Jaime Staines | | 16.3 |
| Pickstock | 1,680 | 1,418 | 84.4 | Christian Democratic Party | Clare Gill | | 13.3 |
| Pickstock | 1,680 | 1,418 | 84.4 | Independent | Robert Taylor | | 0.7 |
| Pickstock | 1,680 | 1,418 | 84.4 | Independent | James Ysaguirre | | 0.4 |
| Stann Creek Rural | 1,856 | 1,343 | 72.4 | People's United Party | David McKoy | | 72.3 |
| Stann Creek Rural | 1,856 | 1,343 | 72.4 | National Independence Party | Harry Stanley | | 23.7 |
| Stann Creek Town | 1,816 | 1,493 | 82.2 | People's United Party | Allan Arthurs | | 52.3 |
| Stann Creek Town | 1,816 | 1,493 | 82.2 | National Independence Party | Paul Guerrero | | 44.2 |
| Toledo North | 547 | 374 | 68.4 | People's United Party | Faustino Zuniga | | 55.6 |
| Toledo North | 547 | 374 | 68.4 | National Independence Party | Charles Westby | | 42.2 |
| Toledo South | 941 | 732 | 77.8 | People's United Party | Sam Vernon | | 48.0 |
| Toledo South | 941 | 732 | 77.8 | National Independence Party | Francis Martinez | | 39.5 |
| Toledo South | 941 | 732 | 77.8 | Christian Democratic Party | Alan Woodeye | | 11.5 |
