= Maxwell Samuels =

Belizean politician (born 1940)

Member of the Belize House of Representatives for Belize Rural North
- In office 30 June 1993 – 7 February 2008
- Preceded by: Sam Rhaburn
- Succeeded by: Edmond Castro

Personal details
- Born: 1940 (age 85–86) Belize City, British Honduras
- Party: People's United Party

Maxwell Ewing Samuels (born 18 September 1940 in Belize City) is a Belizean politician and a member of the People's United Party. He represented the Belize Rural North constituency of Belize District in the House of Representatives of Belize from 1993 until 2008.

A long time law enforcement officer, Samuels served as Commissioner of Police from 1981 until 1986. He was first elected to the Belize House in 1993, defeating United Democratic Party incumbent Area Rep. Sam Rhaburn by four votes. He was re-elected in 1998 and 2003. Under Prime Minister Said Musa Samuels served as Minister of Communications, Transport and Public Utilities until 2005. Samuels was not a candidate for re-election in 2008.
