= 2025 Belizean general election =

- 12 March 2025

All 31 seats in the House of Representatives 16 seats needed for a majority
- Turnout: 64.97% (▼16.89pp)
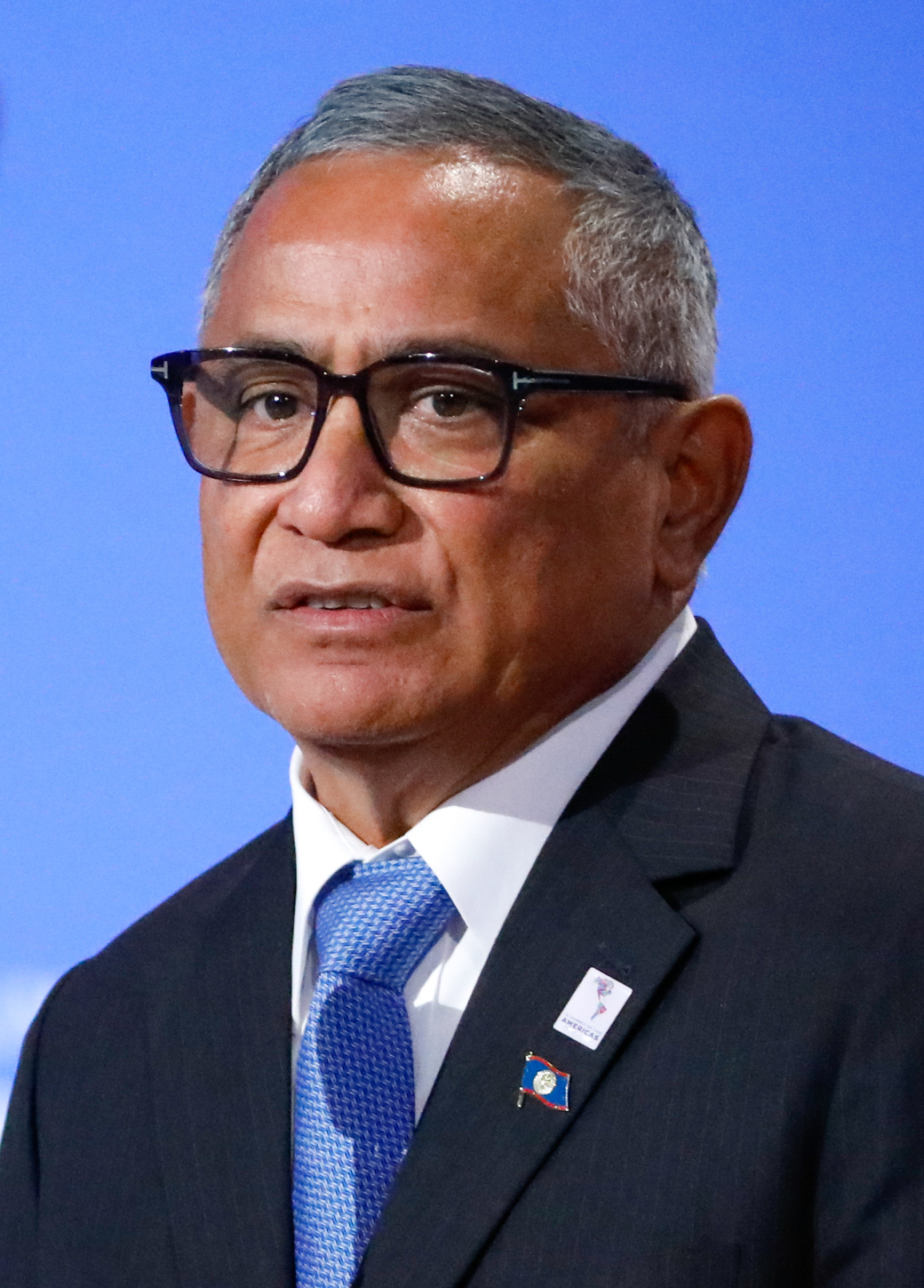

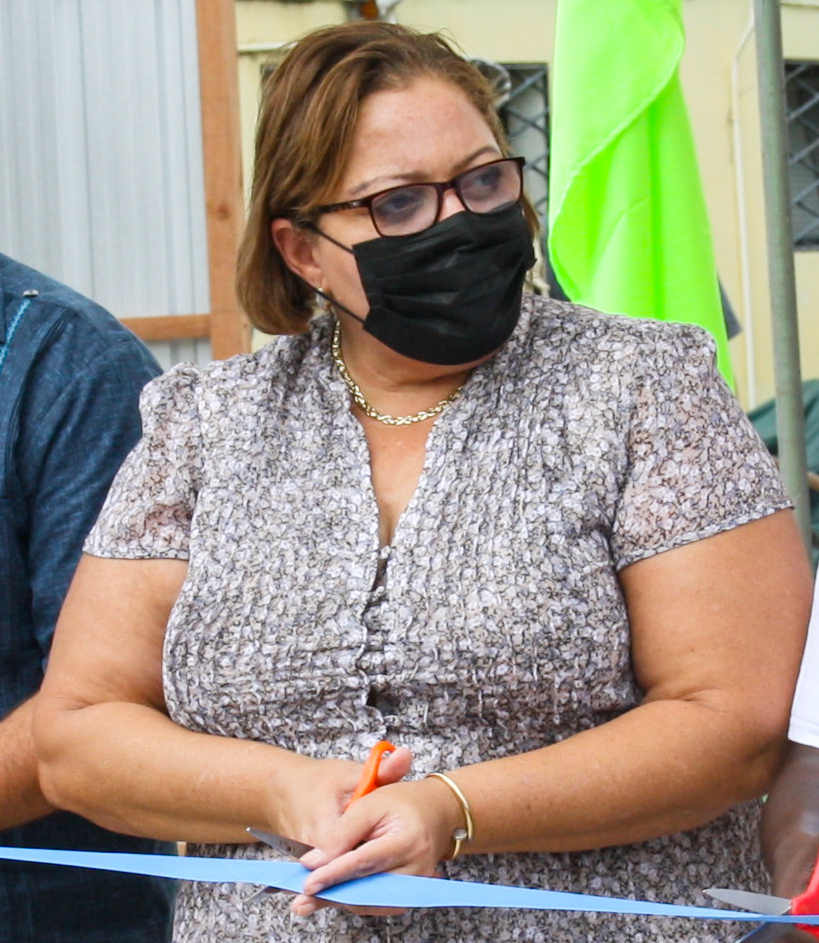

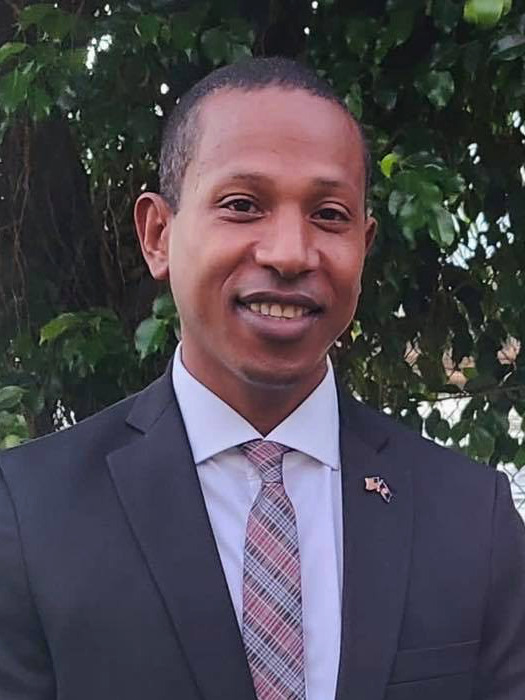
	First party	Second party	Third party
Leader	Johnny Briceño	Tracy Panton	Shyne Barrow
Party	PUP	UDP–Panton	UDP–Shyne
Leader's seat	Orange Walk Central	Albert	Mesopotamia (defeated)
Seats won	26	3	2
Seat change	Steady	– (Note: The UDP split prior to the elections. In 2020 it had received 38.84% of the vote and won five seats)	–
Popular vote	85,096	13,237	23,739
Percentage	67.91%	10.56%	18.95%
Swing	▲8.31pp	–	–
- Results by constituency
Prime Minister before election
Johnny Briceño
PUP
Subsequent Prime Minister
Johnny Briceño
PUP

General elections were held in Belize on 12 March 2025 to elect the 31 members of the House of Representatives. The incumbent government under the People's United Party (PUP) won a second term in office against a divided opposition United Democratic Party (UDP).

== Date ==
The previous general elections were held on 11 November 2020, and the new National Assembly was opened on 11 December 2020. According to Section 84 of the Constitution of Belize, the National Assembly must be dissolved "five years from the date when the two Houses of the former National Assembly first met" unless dissolved sooner by the Governor-General of Belize upon the advice of the prime minister. A general election must be called within three months of a dissolution, which meant the latest possible date for the next Belizean general election would be 11 March 2026.

At the beginning of 2025, Prime Minister Johnny Briceño indicated that elections would be called in the first half of the year. In February, Trinidadian senior counsel and former Attorney General, Anand Ramlogan, formally requested on behalf of his clients that the government refrain from calling an election until it carried out a redistricting exercise. On 11 February, Briceño called the elections for 12 March, with Nominations Day on 24 February. The Writ of Election was formally filed by the Governor-General immediately afterwards. The High Court later dismissed the claim, allowing the election to proceed. While the case was appealed to the Court of Appeal, the Caribbean Court of Justice denied a request for special leave, ruling that it lacked merit. Ramlogan later withdrew the appeal on the request of his clients.

== Candidates ==
=== People's United Party ===
The ruling PUP sought to form the next government after having won a landslide 26 seats in 2020. Incumbent Prime Minister Johnny Briceño of Orange Walk Central lead the PUP into his second election as party leader. The PUP had won 65 out of 67 municipal seats in the 2021 municipal elections and defended 61 of them in 2024. The PUP was also victorious in the two parliamentary by-elections that took place following the 2020 election. Elvia Vega-Samos successfully held Corozal Bay in the 3 March 2021 by-election following the death of her brother, David Vega, from COVID-19. Osmond Martinez also held Toledo East in the 17 July 2024 by-election following the death of Michael Espat.

For the first time in Belize's history, two of the PUP's candidates, Anthony Mahler of Pickstock and Henry Charles Usher of Fort George, were automatically declared the winner of their respective divisions due to the lack of challengers on Nominations Day.

=== United Democratic Party ===
Following a landslide loss in 2020, the UDP faced turbulent circumstances in opposition. The UDP held on to only two municipal seats in the 2021 municipal elections while also losing the Corozal Bay by-election on the same day. Party Leader Patrick Faber of Collet was temporarily stripped of his role as Leader of the Opposition and replaced with Moses "Shyne" Barrow of Mesopotamia after a video of what appeared to be Faber involved in a domestic dispute surfaced online. Faber was reinstated as Leader of the Opposition after a recall convention failed to meet the necessary two-thirds majority to remove him from his post. However, in January 2022, Faber's fiancée alleged to the police that Faber had assaulted her at his home. The charges were withdrawn two days later, but several members of the UDP including the party chairman called on Faber to resign his post as party leader. Faber resigned on 24 January.

The UDP held a leadership convention to elect a new leader on 27 March 2022. Moses "Shyne" Barrow and Tracy Panton of Albert both ran for the position with Barrow emerging victorious by three votes. Turmoil persisted within the UDP following Barrow's election as party leader. Barrow was criticized internally for the UDP's poor showing in both the 2024 municipal elections where they only won six municipal seats and the Toledo East by-election. Following Barrow's decision to remove the standard bearers of the Port Loyola and Caribbean Shores divisions, several UDP standard bearers led a recall petition to oust Barrow from his position. Despite claiming to have collected the necessary signatures, UDP chairman Michael Peyrefitte denied the recall petition. UDP members opposed to Barrow declared Panton to be the interim leader of the party following a convention in October 2024.

While Barrow remained Leader of the Opposition, the UDP was essentially splintered going into the election with both Barrow and Panton claiming to be the true leader of the UDP. A total of 41 candidates were nominated under the UDP banner on Nominations Day running for only 27 out of the 31 divisions. Twenty-five candidates were nominated by Barrow, and fifteen candidates were nominated by Panton. The remaining candidate, Anthony "Boots" Martinez in Port Loyola, did not align with either faction. All candidates running under the UDP were denoted with the colour red on the ballot.

=== Other parties ===
The Belize Justice Movement launched in late 2023 and ran on a platform of social justice with seven candidates. The People's Democratic Movement ran with four candidates. The People's National Party ran with two candidates. The General Opportunity Development Party ran with one candidate.

=== Independents ===
A total of four independent candidates ran in various divisions across the country. In Corozal Bay, Elvia Vega-Samos, who was elected in the 2021 by-election, was defeated by Thea Garcia-Ramirez in the PUP nomination convention for that division. Vega-Samos chose to run as an independent. Barrow also offered to support her candidacy. In Dangriga, no UDP candidate was nominated in the division, leaving independent candidate Cyril "Uruwei" Garcia as the lone challenger to incumbent representative Louis Zabaneh. Mateo Tomas Polanco ran for Stann Creek West, while Orlando Muschamp ran for Toledo East.

== Results ==
The incumbent PUP maintained its tally of 26 seats to the UDP's five seats. The PUP received its sole loss in Cayo West, where incumbent Jorge "Milin" Espat lost to the UDP's Mike Guerra. However, PUP candidate Devin Daily defeated Patrick Faber in Collet. Faber had held the seat since 2003. On the UDP side, Hugo Patt and Tracy Panton successfully defended their seats, and the party maintained its hold on Queen's Square. The UDP factional divide showed in Mesopotamia, where Lee Mark Chang won against both a PUP candidate and the UDP incumbent, Shyne Barrow.

Although the PUP achieved a higher share of the popular vote compared to the previous election, voter turnout was at its lowest since independence.

Party	Votes	%	Seats	+/–
People's United Party	85,096	67.91	26	0
United Democratic Party (Shyne Barrow Faction)	23,739	18.95	2	–
United Democratic Party (Tracy Panton Faction)	13,237	10.56	3	–
Belizeans Justice Movement	445	0.36	0	New
People's National Party	440	0.35	0	New
United Democratic Party (Anthony "Boots" Martinez)	352	0.28	0	–
People's Democratic Movement	115	0.09	0	New
General Opportunity Development Party	26	0.02	0	New
Independents	1,849	1.48	0	0
Total	125,299	100.00	31	0
Valid votes	125,299	97.89		
Invalid/blank votes	2,703	2.11		
Total votes	128,002	100.00		
Registered voters/turnout	197,018	64.97		
Source: Elections and Boundaries Department

== Aftermath ==
After 9 pm, Barrow conceded his seat, and announced his resignation as UDP leader pending a party convention. In his victory speech later that night, PM Briceño thanked voters and announced a "Plan Belize 2.0" for his second term.

On the following day, Briceño was sworn in again as Prime Minister. Tracy Panton was sworn in as Leader of the Opposition on 14 March, supported by the other four UDP members.

On 18 March, Barrow resigned as leader of the UDP, handing over power to Hugo Patt to serve as Interim Leader until the next party convention.
