= People's Democratic Party (Belize) =

The People's Democratic Party was a minor political party in Belize led by Estevan Perera.

== History ==
The party was founded in 1995. In the 1996 Belize City Council elections they received 3% of the vote. They subsequently contested the 1998 general elections, fielding 14 candidates for the 29-seat House of Representatives. They received only 225 votes and failed to win a seat, and did not contest any subsequent national elections.
