= 1969 British Honduras general election =

- 5 December 1969

All 18 seats in the Legislative Assembly 10 seats needed for a majority
- Registered: 29,823
- Turnout: 75.03% (▲5.22pp)
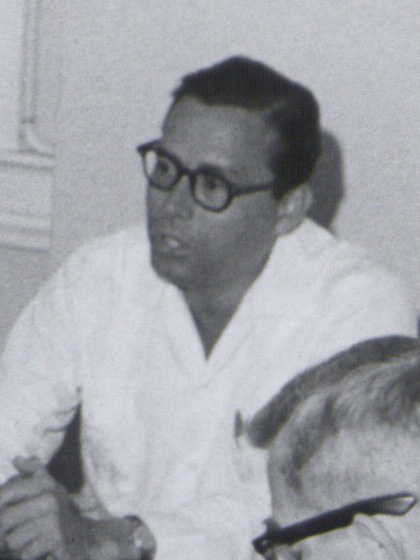

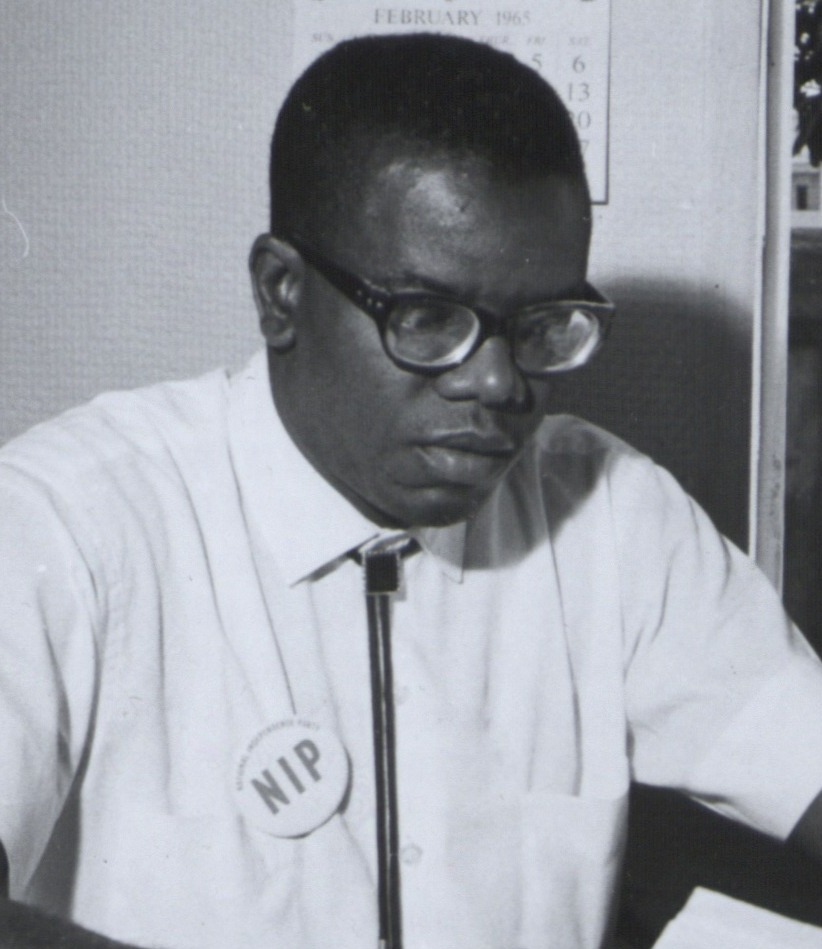
	First party	Second party
Leader	George Cadle Price	Philip Goldson
Party	PUP	NIP–PDM
Leader since	1956	1962
Leader's seat	Freetown	Albert
Last election	59.07%, 16 seats	40.25%, 2 seats
Seats won	17	1
Seat change	▲1	▼1
Popular vote	12,888	8,910
Percentage	58.85%	40.68%
Swing	▲1.05 pp	▲1.28 pp
- Results by constituency
Premier before election
George Cadle Price
PUP
Elected Premier
George Cadle Price
PUP

General elections were held in British Honduras in December 1969. Citizens elected 18 members to the British Honduras Legislative Assembly for a term of five years.

The ruling People's United Party (PUP) won 17 of the 18 seats in the elections, increasing its large majority. Among the opposition only Philip Goldson, leader of the National Independence Party, retained his seat.

== Results ==
Party	Votes	%	Seats	+/–
People's United Party	12,888	58.85	17	+1
NIP–PDM	8,910	40.68	1	–1
Independents	102	0.47	0	0
Total	21,900	100.00	18	0
Valid votes	21,900	97.87		
Invalid/blank votes	477	2.13		
Total votes	22,377	100.00		
Registered voters/turnout	29,823	75.03		
Source: Elections and Boundaries Department
