= National Independence Party (Belize) =

- Leader: Herbert Fuller; Philip Goldson
- Founded: 1 July 1958
- Dissolved: 27 September 1973
- Merger of: Honduran Independence Party; National Party
- Merged into: United Democratic Party
- Ideology: Conservatism

The National Independence Party of Belize was a merger of two Belizean political parties that effectively served as the chief opposition party in Belize for practically all of its existence. It was formed in July 1958 and dissolved as part of the formation of the new United Democratic Party in 1973.

== Formation ==
The NIP was founded on July 1, 1958. Herbert Fuller was elected Leader and James Staines deputy. Other officers included: Chairman Jaime Staines, Secretary Phillip Goldson, Deputy Chairman Robert Reneau, Asst. Sec. Jeannette Buller, Treasurer C. L. B. Rogers and National Organizer Lindsay Burns. District branches were in place by April 1959, and the party gained representation in the Belize City Council in December 1958, when Fuller, Staines, Rogers and Claire Gill were elected, though Meighan and Floss Cassasola campaigned as independents and cut loose from the Party for their behaviour. Another spat came when the Benque Viejo branch set itself up as the Western Independent Party under Juan Gongora and sought affiliation with the NIP, which it agreed to. The NIP also participated in constitutional consultations with Sir Hilary Blood in 1959 and 1960.

== Troubles ==
The NIP was seen as the heir of the National and Honduran Independence parties, and with the popularity of the PUP and the failure by the NIP to shake loose from elements that would have them return to their origins, the party began a run of disappointing performances that would become its main legacy.

March 1, 1961 general elections saw the NIP shut out of the House. Phillip Goldson was appointed by the Governor and subsequently assumed the post of Party Leader from Fuller, who died in March 1962. In the December 1962 City Council elections, the NIP began a run of complete shutouts that lasted until the UDP's 6-3 triumph in 1974. In the town board elections the NIP were more successful, winning two towns in 1963, five in 1966 (three outright), and sliding back to two towns in 1969 and San Ignacio only in 1972. General elections of 1965 and 1969 (in which the NIP collaborated with the breakaway PDM) saw Phillip Goldson retain both times and Edwin Morey earning a surprise victory in 1965.

With the party's loss of face and the frustrations of Belizeans evident, Goldson left to continue his education in the early 1970s and the NIP limped along until the younger, stronger PDM and Liberal Party merged with it to form the UDP in 1973.

== See also ==
- United Democratic Party (Belize)
- Elfreda Reyes
