= 1984 Belizean general election =

- 14 December 1984

All 28 seats in the House of Representatives 15 seats needed for a majority
- Registered: 64,447
- Turnout: 74.96% (▼14.82pp)
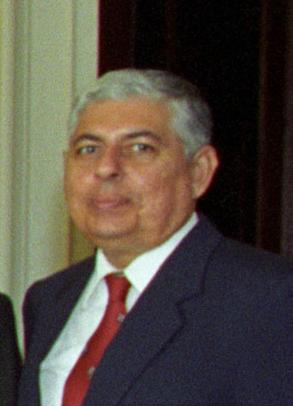

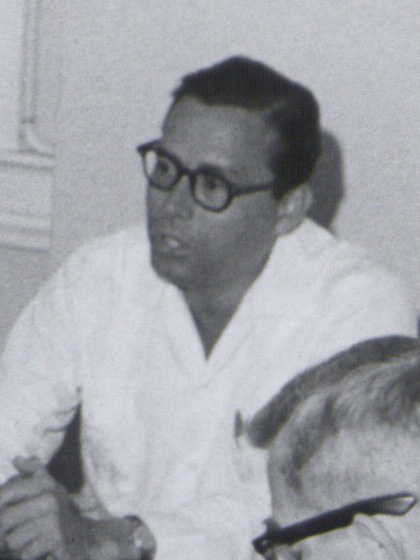
	First party	Second party
Leader	Manuel Esquivel	George Cadle Price
Party	UDP	PUP
Leader's seat	Caribbean Shores	Pickstock (lost re-election)
Last election	47.35%, 5 seats	52.44%, 13 seats
Seats won	21	7 seats
Seat change	▲16	▼6
Popular vote	25,756	20,961
Percentage	54.07%	44.00%
Swing	▲6.72 pp	▼8.44 pp
- Results by constituency
Prime Minister before election
George Cadle Price
PUP
Elected Prime Minister
Manuel Esquivel
UDP

General elections were held in Belize on 14 December 1984. The result was a victory for the opposition United Democratic Party, which won 21 of the 28 seats. Voter turnout was 75.0%.

== Background ==
The elections were the first in Belize since it achieved full independence from the United Kingdom in 1981. In its more than 30 years of existence, the ruling People's United Party had never lost an election at the national level, whilst the opposition had never won more than six seats (out of a possible eighteen in 1974). However, by 1984 the PUP were presiding over an economy in recession and that had just recently been bailed out by the IMF. The party was internally fractured and faced a United Democratic Party that had made significant gains since losing the last general election in 1979. Senator Manuel Esquivel – who Prime Minister George Price defeated in his own House constituency in 1979 – became UDP leader in December 1983.

The ongoing border dispute with Guatemala was also a campaign issue, with the UDP criticising Price's negotiations. The UDP advocated for foreign direct investment to help reduce the unemployment rate.

Just a few months before the election, Price ordered a redistricting of electoral boundaries. This created 10 new constituencies for a total of 28, but the majority were upset because of claims that the PUP drew the boundaries with victory in mind. Esquivel was elected in the newly created Caribbean Shores House constituency, while Price himself was defeated in his Freetown constituency after over 30 years of continuous service in the House of Representatives and its predecessors. Esquivel succeeded Price as prime minister to become the first non-PUP leader in the nation's history. Price continued to lead the PUP from outside the National Assembly while Florencio Marin became Leader of the Opposition.

== Results ==
Party	Votes	%	Seats	+/–
United Democratic Party	25,756	54.07	21	+16
People's United Party	20,961	44.00	7	–6
Christian Democratic Party	708	1.49	0	New
Independents	213	0.45	0	New
Total	47,638	100.00	28	+10
Valid votes	47,638	98.61		
Invalid/blank votes	673	1.39		
Total votes	48,311	100.00		
Registered voters/turnout	64,447	74.96		
Source: Elections and Boundaries Department
