= 1998 Belizean general election =

- 27 August 1998

All 29 seats in the House of Representatives 15 seats needed for a majority
- Registered: 94,173
- Turnout: 90.13% (▲18.03pp)
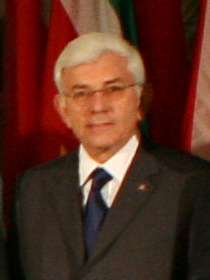

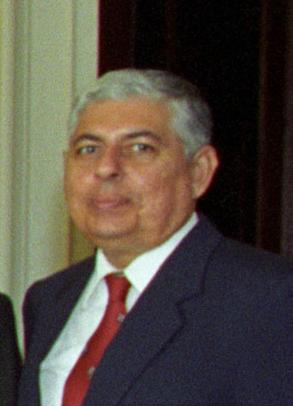
	First party	Second party
Leader	Said Musa	Manuel Esquivel
Party	PUP	UDP
Leader's seat	Fort George	Caribbean Shores (lost re-election)
Last election	51.23%, 13 seats	48.71%, 15 seats
Seats won	26	3
Seat change	▲13	▼12
Popular vote	50,330	33,237
Percentage	59.67%	39.41%
Swing	▲8.44 pp	▼9.30 pp
- Popular vote by constituency
Prime Minister before election
Manuel Esquivel
UDP
Subsequent Prime Minister
Said Musa
PUP

General elections were held in Belize on 27 August 1998. The result was a victory for the People's United Party, which won 26 of the 29 seats and Said Musa was elected as prime minister for the first time. Voter turnout was 90%, the highest since independence.

== Background ==
The ruling United Democratic Party (UDP) was widely perceived as incompetent, incapable of governing and riddled with corruption. Crime and unemployment rose while a number of government projects were universally panned. After winning nationwide municipal elections in 1994, they had lost two other municipal votes in 1996 and 1997. The PUP capitalized on the people's anger to present a manifesto of far-reaching proposals which they claimed would "Set Belize Free".

Prime Minister Manuel Esquivel advised Governor General Sir Colville Young to dissolve the House of Representatives on 13 July 1998. The House stood dissolved with effect from 15 July 1998.

Election day was set for 27 August 1998. Nomination day was 11 August 1998; five political parties nominated 79 candidates, with three independents contesting.

The radio station LOVE FM held the first prime ministerial debate in Belize on 23 July 1998; it was attended by PM Esquivel and PUP leader Musa. Another debate would not be held until the 2020 election.

One controversy as the election date drew near was Attorney General Dean Barrow's rushed appointment of Manuel Sosa to the position of Chief Justice of the Supreme Court on 19 August to replace the ailing George Singh, just days before the election. Then-opposition leader Said Musa objected to this last minute appointment, and after his party took power was able to have it overturned on the grounds that he had not been properly consulted on the appointment as required by the constitution.

The National Alliance for Belizean Rights, which had run in coalition with the UDP in the previous election, chose to run on its own despite its sole member in the House, Philip Goldson, standing down. The party failed to win any seats and was not a factor in the election.

== Results ==
The PUP won 26 of a possible 29 seats, the most lopsided general election win since independence. Several high-ranking UDP members went down to defeat, most notably Esquivel himself in Caribbean Shores. Only Barrow in Queen's Square and Michael Finnegan in Mesopotamia retained their seats for the UDP, while Erwin Contreras narrowly defeated the PUP's Amin Hegar in Cayo West for the UDP's third seat. Barrow became UDP leader shortly after the election.

Party	Votes	%	Seats	+/–
People's United Party	50,330	59.67	26	+13
United Democratic Party	33,237	39.41	3	–12
People's Democratic Party	225	0.27	0	New
National Alliance for Belizean Rights	174	0.21	0	–1
National Reality Truth Creation Party	7	0.01	0	0
Independents	372	0.44	0	0
Total	84,345	100.00	29	0
Valid votes	84,345	99.37		
Invalid/blank votes	531	0.63		
Total votes	84,876	100.00		
Registered voters/turnout	94,173	90.13		
Source: Elections and Boundaries Department
