= Dangriga (Belize House constituency) =

- Constituency for the Belize House of Representatives
- District: Stann Creek
- Electorate: 6,275 (2015)
- Major settlements: Dangriga

Current constituency
- Created: 1961 as Stann Creek Town, renamed 1979
- Party: People's United Party
- Area Representative: Louis Zabaneh

Dangriga is an electoral constituency in the Stann Creek District represented in the House of Representatives of the National Assembly of Belize since 2020 by Louis Zabaneh of the People's United Party.

== Profile ==
The Dangriga constituency was created as Stann Creek Town for the 1961 general election as part of a major nationwide redistricting. The constituency assumed its current name as of the 1979 general election. It includes the town of Dangriga as well as the nearby Sarawee and Hope Creek areas. It is bordered by the Stann Creek West constituency and the Caribbean Sea.

=== July 2015 by-election ===
In June 2015 Area Rep. Ivan Ramos resigned after controversially failing to retain his standard bearer status with the People's United Party. A by-election to determine Ramos' successor was held 8 July 2015. Nominations were formally made on 22 June. Former Dangriga Mayor Frank "Papa" Mena was the UDP nominee, while retired educator Anthony Sabal stood as the PUP candidate after initial reports the PUP might not contest the by-election at all. Llewellyn Lucas from the Belize Green Independent Party was also nominated, becoming that party's first official candidate in any election since it was founded in 2012. A fourth candidate endorsed by both of Belize's other active minor parties, the People's National Party and Vision Inspired by the People, was disqualified due to holding dual citizenship. Belizean candidates for public office may not hold citizenship in any other country.

The by-election was won by Mena with 57.89 percent of the vote, giving the UDP its third consecutive by-election win dating to 2003.

== Area representatives ==
Election	Area representative	Party
1961	Allan Arthurs	PUP
1965	Allan Arthurs	PUP
1969	Allan Arthurs	PUP
1974	Paul Guerrero	UDP
1979	Theodore Aranda	UDP
1983	Theodore Aranda	CDP
1984	Simeon Sampson	PUP
1989	Theodore Aranda	PUP
1993	Russell Garcia	UDP
1998	Theodore Aranda	PUP
2003	Sylvia Flores	PUP
2008	Arthur Roches	UDP
2012	Ivan Ramos	PUP
2015 by-election	Frank Mena	UDP
2015	Frank Mena	UDP
2020	Louis Zabaneh	PUP

== Elections ==
Election	Political result	Candidate	Party	Votes	%	±%
2025 general election Electorate: 6,213; Turnout: 2,925 (47.08%) −29.75	PUP gain from UDP; Majority: 1,609 (26.44 55.01%) +28.57	Louis Zabneh	PUP	2,237	76.48	+13.93
2025 general election Electorate: 6,213; Turnout: 2,925 (47.08%) −29.75	PUP gain from UDP; Majority: 1,609 (26.44 55.01%) +28.57	Cyril Garcia	Independent Politician	628	21.47	-
2020 general election Electorate: 5,482; Turnout: 4,212 (76.83%) +7.63	PUP gain from UDP; Majority: 1,099 (26.44%) +18.92	Louis Zabneh	PUP	2,600	62.55	+17.22
2020 general election Electorate: 5,482; Turnout: 4,212 (76.83%) +7.63	PUP gain from UDP; Majority: 1,099 (26.44%) +18.92	Frank Mena	UDP	1,501	36.11	-16.74
2020 general election Electorate: 5,482; Turnout: 4,212 (76.83%) +7.63	PUP gain from UDP; Majority: 1,099 (26.44%) +18.92	John Suazo	Belize People's Front	56	1.34	-
2015 general election Electorate: 6,452; Turnout: 4,465 (69.20%) +9.63	UDP hold Majority: 336 (7.52%) −9.55	Frank Mena	UDP	2,360	52.85	−5.04
2015 general election Electorate: 6,452; Turnout: 4,465 (69.20%) +9.63	UDP hold Majority: 336 (7.52%) −9.55	Anthony Sabal	PUP	2,024	45.33	+4.51
2015 general election Electorate: 6,452; Turnout: 4,465 (69.20%) +9.63	UDP hold Majority: 336 (7.52%) −9.55	Anthony Petillo	BPP	40	0.90	-
July 2015 by-election Electorate: 6,275; Turnout: 3,738 (59.57%) −5.27	UDP gain from PUP; Majority: 638 (17.07%) +8.26	Frank Mena	UDP	2,164	57.89	+13.51
July 2015 by-election Electorate: 6,275; Turnout: 3,738 (59.57%) −5.27	UDP gain from PUP; Majority: 638 (17.07%) +8.26	Anthony Sabal	PUP	1,526	40.82	−12.37
July 2015 by-election Electorate: 6,275; Turnout: 3,738 (59.57%) −5.27	UDP gain from PUP; Majority: 638 (17.07%) +8.26	Llewellyn Lucas	BGIP	14	0.37	-
2012 general election Electorate: 5,904; Turnout: 3,828 (64.84%) −4.28	PUP gain from UDP; Majority: 337 (8.81%) −6.49	Ivan Ramos	PUP	2,036	53.19	+11.89
2012 general election Electorate: 5,904; Turnout: 3,828 (64.84%) −4.28	PUP gain from UDP; Majority: 337 (8.81%) −6.49	Arthur Roches	UDP	1,699	44.38	−12.22
2012 general election Electorate: 5,904; Turnout: 3,828 (64.84%) −4.28	PUP gain from UDP; Majority: 337 (8.81%) −6.49	Mateo Tomas Polanco	PNP	37	0.97	-
2008 general election Electorate: 5,363; Turnout: 3,707 (69.12%) +0.62	UDP gain from PUP; Majority: 567 (15.3%) +7.48	Arthur Roches	UDP	2,098	56.6	+12.02
2008 general election Electorate: 5,363; Turnout: 3,707 (69.12%) +0.62	UDP gain from PUP; Majority: 567 (15.3%) +7.48	Cassian Nunez	PUP	1,531	41.3	−11.1
2008 general election Electorate: 5,363; Turnout: 3,707 (69.12%) +0.62	UDP gain from PUP; Majority: 567 (15.3%) +7.48	Denton Castillo	NRP	31	0.84	-
2008 general election Electorate: 5,363; Turnout: 3,707 (69.12%) +0.62	UDP gain from PUP; Majority: 567 (15.3%) +7.48	Quentin Mejia	VIP	20	0.54	-
2003 general election Electorate: 4,254; Turnout: 2,914 (68.5%) −15.57	PUP hold Majority: 228 (7.82%) −7.36	Sylvia Flores	PUP	1,527	52.4	−4.41
2003 general election Electorate: 4,254; Turnout: 2,914 (68.5%) −15.57	PUP hold Majority: 228 (7.82%) −7.36	Russell Garcia	UDP	1,299	44.58	+2.95
2003 general election Electorate: 4,254; Turnout: 2,914 (68.5%) −15.57	PUP hold Majority: 228 (7.82%) −7.36	Ian Caliz	Independent	44	1.51	-
1998 general election Electorate: 3,346; Turnout: 2,813 (84.07%) +20.04	PUP gain from UDP; Majority: 427 (15.18%) +2.38	Theodore Aranda	PUP	1,598	56.81	+13.21
1998 general election Electorate: 3,346; Turnout: 2,813 (84.07%) +20.04	PUP gain from UDP; Majority: 427 (15.18%) +2.38	Russell Garcia	UDP	1,171	41.63	−14.77
1998 general election Electorate: 3,346; Turnout: 2,813 (84.07%) +20.04	PUP gain from UDP; Majority: 427 (15.18%) +2.38	Cypriano Luke Palacio	PDP	19	0.67	-
1993 general election Electorate: 4,123; Turnout: 2,640 (64.03%) −2.81	UDP gain from PUP; Majority: 338 (12.8%) +5.3	Russell Garcia	UDP	1,489	56.4	+11.0
1993 general election Electorate: 4,123; Turnout: 2,640 (64.03%) −2.81	UDP gain from PUP; Majority: 338 (12.8%) +5.3	Theodore Aranda	PUP	1,151	43.6	−9.3
1989 general election Electorate: 3,486; Turnout: 2,330 (66.84%) −0.05	PUP hold Majority: 176 (7.5%) −8.3	Theodore Aranda	PUP	1,233	52.9	+9.8
1989 general election Electorate: 3,486; Turnout: 2,330 (66.84%) −0.05	PUP hold Majority: 176 (7.5%) −8.3	Randolph Enriquez	UDP	1,057	45.4	+18.1
1984 general election Electorate: 2,368; Turnout: 1,584 (66.89%) −18.36	PUP gain from CDP; Majority: 250 (15.8%) +7.4	Simeon Sampson	PUP	682	43.1	−2.1
1984 general election Electorate: 2,368; Turnout: 1,584 (66.89%) −18.36	PUP gain from CDP; Majority: 250 (15.8%) +7.4	Henry Anderson	UDP	432	27.3	−26.3
1984 general election Electorate: 2,368; Turnout: 1,584 (66.89%) −18.36	PUP gain from CDP; Majority: 250 (15.8%) +7.4	Theodore Aranda	CDP	385	24.3	-
1984 general election Electorate: 2,368; Turnout: 1,584 (66.89%) −18.36	PUP gain from CDP; Majority: 250 (15.8%) +7.4	Allan Arthurs	Independent	77	4.9	-
1979 general election Electorate: 2,319; Turnout: 1,977 (85.25%) +18.45	UDP hold Majority: 8.4% (−3.7)	Theodore Aranda	UDP		53.6	−1.2
1979 general election Electorate: 2,319; Turnout: 1,977 (85.25%) +18.45	UDP hold Majority: 8.4% (−3.7)	Gadsby Ramos	PUP		45.2	+2.5
1974 general election Electorate: 2,187; Turnout: 1,461 (66.8%) −11.13	UDP gain from PUP; Majority: 12.1% (+1.5)	Paul Guerrero	UDP		54.8	-
1974 general election Electorate: 2,187; Turnout: 1,461 (66.8%) −11.13	UDP gain from PUP; Majority: 12.1% (+1.5)	Allan Arthurs	PUP		42.7	−11.6
1969 general election Electorate: 2,093; Turnout: 1,631 (77.93%) +3.59	PUP hold Majority: 10.6% (+8.9)	Allan Arthurs	PUP		54.3	+4.3
1969 general election Electorate: 2,093; Turnout: 1,631 (77.93%) +3.59	PUP hold Majority: 10.6% (+8.9)	Rodwell Leslie	NIP		43.7	−4.6
1965 general election Electorate: 2,666; Turnout: 1,982 (74.34%) −7.87	PUP hold Majority: 1.7% (−6.4)	Allan Arthurs	PUP		50.0	−2.3
1965 general election Electorate: 2,666; Turnout: 1,982 (74.34%) −7.87	PUP hold Majority: 1.7% (−6.4)	Albert Arzu	NIP		48.3	+4.1
1961 general election Electorate: 1,816; Turnout: 1,493 (82.21%) n/a	PUP win Majority: 8.1% (n/a)	Allan Arthurs	PUP		52.3	-
1961 general election Electorate: 1,816; Turnout: 1,493 (82.21%) n/a	PUP win Majority: 8.1% (n/a)	Paul Guerrero	NIP		44.2	-

National Assembly of Belize
Preceded by (office established)	Constituency represented by the leader of the opposition 1981–1982	Succeeded by Mesopotamia
