= List of heads of state of Belize =

This is a list of the heads of state of Belize, from the independence of Belize in 1981 to the present day.

From 1981 the head of state under the Constitution of Belize is the Monarch of Belize, currently King Charles III, who is also the monarch of the other Commonwealth realms. The King is represented in Belize by a governor-general.

== Monarch (1981–present) ==
The succession to the throne is the same as the succession to the British throne.

No.	Portrait	Monarch (Birth–Death)	Reign			Royal House	Prime minister(s)
No.	Portrait	Monarch (Birth–Death)	Reign start	Reign end	Duration	Royal House	Prime minister(s)
1		Queen; Elizabeth II (1926–2022)	21 September 1981	8 September 2022	40 years, 352 days	Windsor	Price; Esquivel; Price; Esquivel; Musa; Barrow; Briceño
2		King; Charles III (born 1948)	8 September 2022	Incumbent	4 years, 35 days	Windsor	Briceño

=== Governor-General ===
The Governor-General is the representative of the Monarch in Belize and exercises most of the powers of the Monarch. The Governor-General is appointed for an indefinite term, serving at the pleasure of the Monarch. After the passage of the Statute of Westminster 1931, the Governor-General is appointed solely on the advice of the Cabinet of Belize without the involvement of the British government. In the event of a vacancy the Chief Justice served as Officer Administering the Government.

Following is a list of people who have served as Governor-General of Belize since independence in 1981.

Status

Denotes acting Governor-General

No.	Portrait	Name (Birth–Death)	Term of office			Monarch	Prime minister(s)
No.	Portrait	Name (Birth–Death)	Took office	Left office	Time in office	Monarch	Prime minister(s)
1		Dame; Elmira Minita Gordon (1930–2021)	21 September 1981	17 November 1993	12 years, 57 days	Elizabeth II	Price; Esquivel; Price; Esquivel
2		Sir; Colville Young (born 1932)	17 November 1993	30 April 2021	32 years, 330 days	Elizabeth II	Esquivel; Musa; Barrow; Briceño
–		Stuart Leslie (born 1964)	30 April 2021	27 May 2021	27 days	Elizabeth II	Briceño
3		Dame; Froyla Tzalam (born 1971)	27 May 2021	Incumbent	5 years, 139 days	Elizabeth II; Charles III	Briceño

== Standards ==
Governor-General's Standard
