= Mesopotamia (Belize House constituency) =

Electoral district in Belize City, formed 1961

- Constituency for the Belize House of Representatives
- District: Belize
- Electorate: 2,253 (2025)
- Major settlements: Belize City (part)

Current constituency
- Created: 1961
- Party: United Democratic Party
- Area Representative: Lee Mark Chang

Mesopotamia, sometimes abbreviated as Mesop, is an electoral constituency in the Belize District represented in the House of Representatives of the National Assembly of Belize since 2025 by Lee Mark Chang of the United Democratic Party (UDP).

== Profile ==
The Mesopotamia constituency was created for the 1961 general election as part of a major nationwide redistricting. It currently comprises much of central Belize City, surrounded by the Collet, Queen's Square and Albert constituencies. The UDP has continuously held Mesopotamia since the 1979 general election, longer than any other constituency. It is widely considered a strong UDP safe seat.

Longtime representative Michael Finnegan stood down at the 2020 general election and was succeeded by his nephew, internationally known rapper Shyne Barrow. In 2025, Shyne lost re-election to Lee Mark Chang; the former subsequently resigned as leader of the UDP.

== Area representatives ==
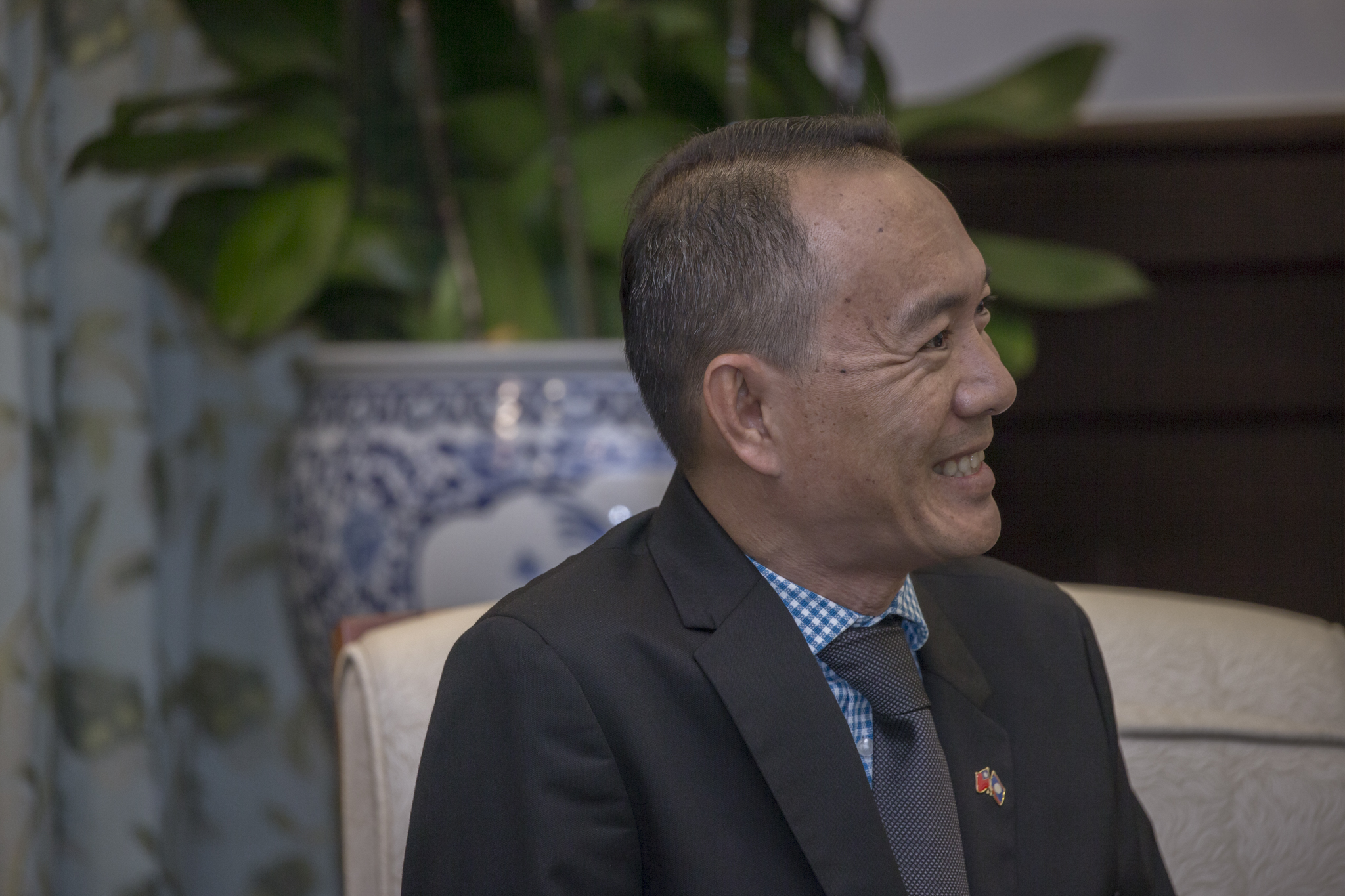
Lee Mark Chang, current area representative

Election	Area representative	Party
1961	C. L. B. Rogers	PUP
1965	C. L. B. Rogers	PUP
1969	C. L. B. Rogers	PUP
1974	C. L. B. Rogers	PUP
1979	Curl Thompson	UDP
1984	Curl Thompson	UDP
1989	Curl Thompson	UDP
1993	Michael Finnegan	UDP
1998	Michael Finnegan	UDP
2003	Michael Finnegan	UDP
2008	Michael Finnegan	UDP
2012	Michael Finnegan	UDP
2015	Michael Finnegan	UDP
2020	Shyne Barrow	UDP
2025	Lee Mark Chang	UDP

== Elections ==
Election	Political result	Candidate	Party	Votes	%	±%
2025 general election Electorate: 2,253; Turnout: 1,514 (67.20%) −8.12	UDP hold Majority: 98 (6.47%) −2.80	Lee Mark Chang	UDP	601	39.70	-
2025 general election Electorate: 2,253; Turnout: 1,514 (67.20%) −8.12	UDP hold Majority: 98 (6.47%) −2.80	Lawrence Russel Ellis	PUP	503	33.22	−10.57
2025 general election Electorate: 2,253; Turnout: 1,514 (67.20%) −8.12	UDP hold Majority: 98 (6.47%) −2.80	Shyne Barrow	UDP	318	21.00	-
2020 general election Electorate: 2,277; Turnout: 1,715 (75.32%) +17.98	UDP hold Majority: 159 (9.27%) −46.56	Shyne Barrow	UDP	910	53.06	−23.82
2020 general election Electorate: 2,277; Turnout: 1,715 (75.32%) +17.98	UDP hold Majority: 159 (9.27%) −46.56	(Dr.) Candice Pitts	PUP	751	43.79	+22.74
2015 general election Electorate: 3,711; Turnout: 2,128 (57.34%) −3.47	UDP hold Majority: 1,188 (55.83%) −8.93	Michael Finnegan	UDP	1,636	76.88	−4.72
2015 general election Electorate: 3,711; Turnout: 2,128 (57.34%) −3.47	UDP hold Majority: 1,188 (55.83%) −8.93	Dorla Vaughan	PUP	448	21.05	+4.21
2012 general election Electorate: 3,710; Turnout: 2,256 (60.81%) −5.21	UDP hold Majority: 1,461 (64.76%) +9.99	Michael Finnegan	UDP	1,841	81.60	+4.68
2012 general election Electorate: 3,710; Turnout: 2,256 (60.81%) −5.21	UDP hold Majority: 1,461 (64.76%) +9.99	Philip Palacio	PUP	380	16.84	−5.31
2008 general election Electorate: 3,255; Turnout: 2,149 (66.02%) −3.86	UDP hold Majority: 1,177 (54.77%) +20.4	Michael Finnegan	UDP	1,653	76.92	+10.0
2008 general election Electorate: 3,255; Turnout: 2,149 (66.02%) −3.86	UDP hold Majority: 1,177 (54.77%) +20.4	Austin Waight	PUP	476	22.15	−10.4
2003 general election Electorate: 2,178; Turnout: 1,892 (69.88%) −14.3	UDP hold Majority: 526 (34.37%) +20.1	Michael Finnegan	UDP	1,024	66.92	+10.34
2003 general election Electorate: 2,178; Turnout: 1,892 (69.88%) −14.3	UDP hold Majority: 526 (34.37%) +20.1	Philip Brackett	PUP	498	32.55	−9.76
1998 general election Electorate: 1,707; Turnout: 1,437 (84.18%) +26.81	UDP hold Majority: 205 (14.27%) −1.73	Michael Finnegan	UDP	813	56.58	−1.42
1998 general election Electorate: 1,707; Turnout: 1,437 (84.18%) +26.81	UDP hold Majority: 205 (14.27%) −1.73	Gilbert Ray Lightburn	PUP	608	42.31	+0.31
1998 general election Electorate: 1,707; Turnout: 1,437 (84.18%) +26.81	UDP hold Majority: 205 (14.27%) −1.73	Lisburn Earl Peters	PDP	9	0.63	-
1993 general election Electorate: 3,052; Turnout: 1,751 (57.37%) +1.66	UDP hold Majority: 281 (16.0%) +8.3	Michael Finnegan	UDP	1,016	58.0	+4.9
1993 general election Electorate: 3,052; Turnout: 1,751 (57.37%) +1.66	UDP hold Majority: 281 (16.0%) +8.3	Steve Latchman	PUP	735	42.0	−3.4
1989 general election Electorate: 2,818; Turnout: 1,570 (55.71%) −5.43	UDP hold Majority: 121 (7.7%) −30.8	Curl Thompson	UDP	834	53.1	−15.3
1989 general election Electorate: 2,818; Turnout: 1,570 (55.71%) −5.43	UDP hold Majority: 121 (7.7%) −30.8	Steve Latchman	PUP	713	45.4	+15.5
1984 general election Electorate: 2,460; Turnout: 1,504 (61.14%) −26.0	UDP hold Majority: 38.5% (+34.4)	Curl Thompson	UDP		68.4	+17.1
1984 general election Electorate: 2,460; Turnout: 1,504 (61.14%) −26.0	UDP hold Majority: 38.5% (+34.4)	Myrtle Palacio	PUP		29.9	−17.3
1979 general election Electorate: 2,489; Turnout: 2,169 (87.14%) +14.89	UDP gain from PUP; Majority: 4.1% (−4.7)	Curl Thompson	UDP		51.3	+6.9
1979 general election Electorate: 2,489; Turnout: 2,169 (87.14%) +14.89	UDP gain from PUP; Majority: 4.1% (−4.7)	C. L. B. Rogers	PUP		47.2	−5.5
1974 general election Electorate: 2,281; Turnout: 1,648 (72.25%) +8.65	PUP hold Majority: 8.8% (−0.7)	C. L. B. Rogers	PUP		52.7	−1.2
1974 general election Electorate: 2,281; Turnout: 1,648 (72.25%) +8.65	PUP hold Majority: 8.8% (−0.7)	Curl Thompson	UDP		44.4	-
1969 general election Electorate: 2,066; Turnout: 1,314 (63.6%) −7.07	PUP hold Majority: 9.5% (+3.4)	C. L. B. Rogers	PUP		53.9	+1.7
1969 general election Electorate: 2,066; Turnout: 1,314 (63.6%) −7.07	PUP hold Majority: 9.5% (+3.4)	Colville Young	NIP		43.9	−2.2
1965 general election Electorate: 3,396; Turnout: 2,400 (70.67%) −9.02	PUP hold Majority: 6.1% (−27.9)	C. L. B. Rogers	PUP		52.2	−10.2
1965 general election Electorate: 3,396; Turnout: 2,400 (70.67%) −9.02	PUP hold Majority: 6.1% (−27.9)	Colville Young	NIP		46.1	+17.7
1961 general election Electorate: 2,501; Turnout: 1,993 (79.69%) n/a	PUP win Majority: 34.0% (n/a)	C. L. B. Rogers	PUP		62.4	-
1961 general election Electorate: 2,501; Turnout: 1,993 (79.69%) n/a	PUP win Majority: 34.0% (n/a)	Erlean Casasola	NIP		28.4	-
1961 general election Electorate: 2,501; Turnout: 1,993 (79.69%) n/a	PUP win Majority: 34.0% (n/a)	Edward Usher	CDP		8.6	-

National Assembly of Belize
Preceded by Dangriga	Constituency represented by the leader of the opposition 1983–1984	Succeeded by Corozal South East
