= Theodore Aranda =

Belizean politician (1934–2022)

Leader of the Opposition
- In office 21 September 1981 – December 1982
- Monarch: Elizabeth II
- Governor General: Dame Elmira Minita Gordon
- Prime Minister: George Cadle Price
- Preceded by: (office established)
- Succeeded by: Curl Thompson

Member of the Belize House of Representatives for Dangriga
- In office 27 August 1998 – 5 March 2003
- Preceded by: Russell Garcia
- Succeeded by: Sylvia Flores

Member of the Belize House of Representatives for Dangriga
- In office 4 September 1989 – 30 June 1993
- Preceded by: Simeon Sampson
- Succeeded by: Russell Garcia

Member of the Belize House of Representatives for Dangriga
- In office 21 November 1979 – 14 December 1984
- Preceded by: Paul Guerrero
- Succeeded by: Simeon Sampson

Personal details
- Born: Theodore Roosevelt Aranda; 1934 Stann Creek Town, British Honduras (now Dangriga, Belize)
- Died: July 2022 (aged 87–88) Belize
- Party: People's United Party (after 1984); Christian Democratic Party (1983–1984); United Democratic Party (until 1983)
- Education: University of Illinois Urbana-Champaign

Theodore Roosevelt "Ted" Aranda (1934 – July 2022) was a Belizean politician and Garifuna activist.

== Education and UDP career ==
Aranda held an M.A. (1967) and a Ph.D. (1971) in Education from the University of Illinois Urbana-Champaign. He worked with the Belizean branch of the CARE organization. In 1974, he joined the newly formed United Democratic Party and quickly rose up the ranks. In 1979, he was one of the five representatives elected for the UDP, representing the Dangriga constituency. He was elected UDP leader as the previous leader, Dean Lindo, was defeated for re-election in the Fort George constituency. After a stormy stint as the country's first post-independence Leader of the Opposition, Aranda was either ousted or resigned from the UDP leadership in late 1982, leaving the party entirely shortly thereafter.

== Christian Democratic Party and move to the PUP ==
Aranda briefly revived the Christian Democratic Party in 1983 and unsuccessfully sought re-election in Dangriga under its banner in 1984, finishing third with 24.3 percent of the vote. He went on to join the People's United Party and re-captured the Dangriga seat as its candidate in 1989. Russell "Chiste" Garcia defeated him for the seat in 1993, but Aranda won a third non-consecutive term in 1998. He was not a candidate for re-election in 2003. Since Belize's 1981 independence from Great Britain Aranda was the only person to win election to the Belize House as a candidate for both the UDP and the PUP.

== World Garifuna Organization ==
In 2000, Aranda formed the World Garifuna Organization, a body claiming to represent Garinagu across the world and in Belize, though the official Belizean body is the National Garifuna Council.

Aranda had been at odds with younger members of the Garinagu population.

== Death ==
He died in July 2022.
