= Corozal South East =

- Constituency for the Belize House of Representatives
- District: Corozal
- Electorate: 6,477 (2015)
- Major settlements: Sarteneja, San Joaquin

Current constituency
- Created: 1984
- Party: People's United Party
- Area Representative: Florencio Julian Marin

Corozal South East is an electoral constituency in the Corozal District represented in the House of Representatives of the National Assembly of Belize since 2008 by Florencio Julian Marin of the People's United Party.

== Profile ==
The Corozal South East constituency was one of 10 new seats created for the 1984 general election, created by a split of the previous Corozal South constituency. It is the largest constituency geographically in Corozal District, including the villages of Caledonia, Sarteneja and San Joaquin.

Corozal South East has been continuously held by the People's United Party (PUP) since its creation, first by former Leader of the Opposition Florencio Marin, then by his son Florencio Julian Marin. The elder Marin previously represented Corozal South.

It is considered a safe seat for the People’s United Party, as it has never been held by any party other than the PUP; nor had its predecessor constituency.

== Area representatives ==
Election	Area representative	Party
1984	Florencio Marin	PUP
1989	Florencio Marin	PUP
1993	Florencio Marin	PUP
1998	Florencio Marin	PUP
2003	Florencio Marin	PUP
2008	Florencio Julian Marin	PUP
2012	Florencio Julian Marin	PUP
2015	Florencio Julian Marin	PUP
2020	Florencio Julian Marin	PUP

== Elections ==
Election	Political result	Candidate	Party	Votes	%	±%
2025 general election Electorate: 7,337; Turnout: 5,492 (74.85%) −12.69	PUP hold Majority: 1,928 (35.10%) +22.00	Florencio Julian Marin	PUP	3,683	67.06	+11.09
2025 general election Electorate: 7,337; Turnout: 5,492 (74.85%) −12.69	PUP hold Majority: 1,928 (35.10%) +22.00	Antonio Herrera	UDP	1,755	31.96	-10.91
2020 general election Electorate: 7,012; Turnout: 6,138 (87.54%) +5.14	PUP hold Majority: 799 (13.10%) +10.02	Florencio Julian Marin	PUP	3,413	55.97	+4.98
2020 general election Electorate: 7,012; Turnout: 6,138 (87.54%) +5.14	PUP hold Majority: 799 (13.10%) +10.02	Antonio Herrera	UDP	2,614	42.87	-5.04
2020 general election Electorate: 7,012; Turnout: 6,138 (87.54%) +5.14	PUP hold Majority: 799 (13.10%) +10.02	Eloim Ellis	Belize People's Front	57	0.93	-
2020 general election Electorate: 7,012; Turnout: 6,138 (87.54%) +5.14	PUP hold Majority: 799 (13.10%) +10.02	Edna Doris Diaz	BPP	14	0.23	-0.33
2015 general election Electorate: 6,477; Turnout: 5,337 (82.40%) −3.25	PUP hold Majority: 164 (3.08%) -4.27	Florencio Julian Marin	PUP	2,721	50.99	-2.48
2015 general election Electorate: 6,477; Turnout: 5,337 (82.40%) −3.25	PUP hold Majority: 164 (3.08%) -4.27	Evan Mateo Cowo	UDP	2,557	47.91	+1.79
2015 general election Electorate: 6,477; Turnout: 5,337 (82.40%) −3.25	PUP hold Majority: 164 (3.08%) -4.27	Edna Doris Diaz	BPP	30	0.56	-
2012 general election Electorate: 6,549; Turnout: 5,609 (85.65%) −1.84	PUP hold Majority: 412 (7.35%) +7.02	Florencio Julian Marin	PUP	2,999	53.47	+3.4
2012 general election Electorate: 6,549; Turnout: 5,609 (85.65%) −1.84	PUP hold Majority: 412 (7.35%) +7.02	Raul Fabian Rosado	UDP	2,587	46.12	−3.62
2008 general election Electorate: 5,597; Turnout: 4,897 (87.49%) −0.77	PUP hold Majority: 16 (0.33%) −5.03	Florencio Julian Marin	PUP	2,452	50.07	−1.31
2008 general election Electorate: 5,597; Turnout: 4,897 (87.49%) −0.77	PUP hold Majority: 16 (0.33%) −5.03	Servando Samos	UDP	2,436	49.74	+3.72
2003 general election Electorate: 4,752; Turnout: 4,194 (88.26%) −3.45	PUP hold Majority: 225 (5.36%) −28.35	Florencio Marin	PUP	2,155	51.38	−15.12
2003 general election Electorate: 4,752; Turnout: 4,194 (88.26%) −3.45	PUP hold Majority: 225 (5.36%) −28.35	Servando Samos	UDP	1,930	46.02	+13.23
2003 general election Electorate: 4,752; Turnout: 4,194 (88.26%) −3.45	PUP hold Majority: 225 (5.36%) −28.35	Hipolito Bautista	Independent	62	1.48	-
1998 general election Electorate: 3,704; Turnout: 3,397 (91.71%) +3.37	PUP hold Majority: 1,145 (33.71%) +13.51	Florencio Marin	PUP	2,259	66.5	+6.4
1998 general election Electorate: 3,704; Turnout: 3,397 (91.71%) +3.37	PUP hold Majority: 1,145 (33.71%) +13.51	Lucio Navarro	UDP	1,114	32.79	−7.11
1993 general election Electorate: 3,672; Turnout: 3,244 (88.34%) −1.79	PUP hold Majority: 656 (20.2%) +13.0	Florencio Marin	PUP	1,950	60.1	+7.2
1993 general election Electorate: 3,672; Turnout: 3,244 (88.34%) −1.79	PUP hold Majority: 656 (20.2%) +13.0	Lucio Navarro	UDP	1,294	39.9	−5.8
1989 general election Electorate: 3,203; Turnout: 2,887 (90.13%) +0.14	PUP hold Majority: 208 (7.2%) −2.2	Florencio Marin	PUP	1,528	52.9	−1.2
1989 general election Electorate: 3,203; Turnout: 2,887 (90.13%) +0.14	PUP hold Majority: 208 (7.2%) −2.2	Doroteo Pott	UDP	1,320	45.7	+1.0
1984 general election Electorate: 2,458; Turnout: 2,212 (89.99%) n/a	PUP win Majority: 208 (9.4%) n/a	Florencio Marin	PUP	1,196	54.1	-
1984 general election Electorate: 2,458; Turnout: 2,212 (89.99%) n/a	PUP win Majority: 208 (9.4%) n/a	Concepcion Campos	UDP	988	44.7	-

National Assembly of Belize
Preceded by Mesopotamia	Constituency represented by the leader of the opposition 1984–1989	Succeeded by Caribbean Shores
