= Valdemar Castillo =

Belizean politician

Member of the Belize House of Representatives for Corozal North
- In office 21 November 1979 – 7 February 2008
- Preceded by: Vildo Marin
- Succeeded by: Nemencio Acosta

Personal details
- Born: 22 May 1946 (age 79) Corozal Town, British Honduras (now Belize)
- Party: People's United Party

Valdemar Isidro Castillo (born 22 May 1946, Corozal Town) is a Belizean politician of Mestizo descent and a member of the People's United Party. He was the representative for the Corozal North constituency from 1979 to 2008. He served as Minister of Labour, Local Government and the Sugar Industry from 1999 until 2008 under Prime Minister Said Musa. Castillo fought alongside George Cadle Price and achieved independence for Belize on 21 September 1981.

Castillo was elected to the Belize House of Representatives from the Corozal North constituency in 1979 and served until he was defeated for re-election in 2008. He attempted to regain the seat in 2012 but was defeated by Hugo Amilcar Patt.

== Education ==
Castillo attended St Francis Xavier Primary School and later Saint Francis Xavier College in Corozal Town. He holds a degree from London School of accounting and Bookeeping.
