= Hugo Patt =

Belizean politician

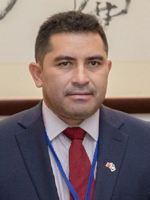

Member of the House of Representatives
- Incumbent
- Assumed office 2013
- Preceded by: Nemencio Acosta
- Constituency: Corozal North

Chair of the United Democratic Party
- Preceded by: Shyne
- Succeeded by: Tracy Panton

Deputy Prime Minister of Belize
- In office 11 February 2020 – 11 November 2020
- Preceded by: Patrick Faber
- Succeeded by: Cordel Hyde

Personal details
- Born: Hugo Amilcar Patt
- Party: United Democratic

Hugo Amilcar Patt is a Belizean politician who has been a member of the House of Representatives from Corozal North as a member of the United Democratic Party (UDP) since 2013. During his tenure in the House of Representatives he was Deputy Prime Minister after the resignation of Patrick Faber and interim chair of the UDP after the resignation of Shyne.

== Career ==
In the 2012 election Patt was elected to the House of Representatives from Corozal North as a member of the United Democratic Party (UDP). He was reelected in the 2015 and 2020 elections. He was the only member of the UDP to win in the Corozal District in the 2025 election.

Deputy Prime Minister Patrick Faber resigned on 10 February 2020, and Patt was selected to replace him on 11 February. From 6 July to 9 July 2019, Patt was acting prime minister while Dean Barrow was outside the country. In 2022, Shyne organised a shadow cabinet and Patt held the portfolios of Natural Resources, Petroleum, Mining, Agriculture, Food Security, & Enterprise. In 2024, Shyne removed Faber and Tracy Panton from multiple committees and this resulted in Shyne and Patt being the only opposition members in over a dozen committees; both men were absent from committee hearings.

Patt was elected as Deputy Party Leader of the UDP on 11 February 2020. Shyne resigned as leader of the UDP after losing his seat in the 2025 election. Patt, now as interim leader, supported making Panton the leader of the party.

== Political positions ==
Patt voted in favour of a resolution celebrating 35 years of diplomatic relations between Taiwan and Belize in 2024.

== Works cited ==
=== News ===
- "As Government, Would U.D.P. Severe Ties with Taiwan?". Greater Belize Media. 18 September 2024. Archived from the original on 24 June 2025.
- "Barrow and Patt No Show to House Committees". Greater Belize Media. 12 November 2024. Archived from the original on 24 June 2025.
- "Hugo Patt Supports Tracy Panton as Party Leader". Greater Belize Media. 18 March 2025. Archived from the original on 24 June 2025.
- "Hugo Patt sworn in as Deputy Prime Minister". Breaking Belize News. 11 February 2020. Archived from the original on 24 June 2025.
- "Top 10 Constituencies to Watch in Belize's March 12 Election". Greater Belize Media. 10 March 2025. Archived from the original on 24 June 2025.
- Gordon, Britney (14 March 2025). "Hugo Patt Sole Red Victor in Corozal Constituencies". Greater Belize Media. Archived from the original on 24 June 2025.
- Humes, Aaron (7 April 2022). "United Democratic Party announces revised Shadow Cabinet". Breaking Belize News. Archived from the original on 24 June 2025.

=== Web ===
- "General Elections 2012". Elections and Boundaries Department. Archived from the original on 16 October 2014.
- "Prime Minister Departs the Country". Government of Belize. 6 July 2019. Archived from the original on 24 June 2025.
