= Corozal North =

- Constituency for the Belize House of Representatives
- District: Corozal
- Electorate: 6,877 (2015)
- Major settlements: Corozal Town (part), Patchacan

Current constituency
- Created: 1961
- Party: United Democratic Party
- Area Representative: Hugo Amilcar Patt

Corozal North is an electoral constituency in the Corozal District represented in the House of Representatives of the National Assembly of Belize since 2012 by Hugo Amilcar Patt of the United Democratic Party.

== Profile ==
The Corozal North constituency was created for the 1961 general election as part of a major nationwide redistricting. It is the northernmost constituency in the country, running along the Mexican border on the Hondo River. Settlements in the constituency include Paraíso, Patchacan and a portion of Corozal Town.

== Area representatives ==
Election	Area representative	Party
1961	Santiago Ricalde	PUP
1965	Santiago Ricalde	PUP
1969	Santiago Ricalde	PUP
1974	Vildo Marin	PUP
1979	Valdemar Castillo	PUP
1984	Valdemar Castillo	PUP
1989	Valdemar Castillo	PUP
1993	Valdemar Castillo	PUP
1998	Valdemar Castillo	PUP
2003	Valdemar Castillo	PUP
2008	Nemencio Acosta	UDP
2012	Hugo Amilcar Patt	UDP
2015	Hugo Amilcar Patt	UDP
2020	Hugo Amilcar Patt	UDP

== Elections ==
Election	Political result	Candidate	Party	Votes	%	±%
2025 general election Electorate: 7,466; Turnout: 5.989 (80.22%) −7.71	UDP hold Majority: 1,112 (18.57%) +3.57	Hugo Amilcar Patt	UDP	3,479	58.39	+1.43
2025 general election Electorate: 7,466; Turnout: 5.989 (80.22%) −7.71	UDP hold Majority: 1,112 (18.57%) +3.57	David Castillo	PUP	2,385	39.82	-2.14
2025 general election Electorate: 7,466; Turnout: 5.989 (80.22%) −7.71	UDP hold Majority: 1,112 (18.57%) +3.57	Condaace Espedido	Belizeans Justice Movement	44	0.73	-
2020 general election Electorate: 7,000; Turnout: 6,155 (87.93%) +5.54	UDP hold Majority: 916 (15.00%) +6.30	Hugo Amilcar Patt	UDP	3,479	56.96	+3.08
2020 general election Electorate: 7,000; Turnout: 6,155 (87.93%) +5.54	UDP hold Majority: 916 (15.00%) +6.30	David Castillo	PUP	2,563	41.96	-3.22
2020 general election Electorate: 7,000; Turnout: 6,155 (87.93%) +5.54	UDP hold Majority: 916 (15.00%) +6.30	Alfonso Acosta	Belize People's Front	66	1.08	-
2015 general election Electorate: 6,877; Turnout: 5,666 (82.39%) +0.27	UDP hold Majority: 493 (8.70%) +4.65	Hugo Amilcar Patt	UDP	3,053	53.88	+2.00
2015 general election Electorate: 6,877; Turnout: 5,666 (82.39%) +0.27	UDP hold Majority: 493 (8.70%) +4.65	David Castillo	PUP	2,560	45.18	-2.65
2015 general election Electorate: 6,877; Turnout: 5,666 (82.39%) +0.27	UDP hold Majority: 493 (8.70%) +4.65	Edna Doris Diaz	BPP	30	0.56	-
2012 general election Electorate: 6,233; Turnout: 5,152 (82.66%) −2.48	UDP hold Majority: 209 (4.05%) −5.76	Hugo Amilcar Patt	UDP	2,673	51.88	−2.00
2012 general election Electorate: 6,233; Turnout: 5,152 (82.66%) −2.48	UDP hold Majority: 209 (4.05%) −5.76	Valdemar Castillo	PUP	2,464	47.83	+2.94
2008 general election Electorate: 5,432; Turnout: 4,625 (85.14%) −2.42	UDP gain from PUP; Majority: 454 (9.81%) +9.58	Nemencio Acosta	UDP	2,530	54.7	+5.86
2008 general election Electorate: 5,432; Turnout: 4,625 (85.14%) −2.42	UDP gain from PUP; Majority: 454 (9.81%) +9.58	Valdemar Castillo	PUP	2,076	44.89	−4.18
2012 general election Electorate: 6,233; Turnout: 5,152 (82.66%) −2.48	UDP hold Majority: 209 (4.05%) −5.76	Hugo Amilcar Patt	UDP	2,673	51.88	−2.82
2012 general election Electorate: 6,233; Turnout: 5,152 (82.66%) −2.48	UDP hold Majority: 209 (4.05%) −5.76	Valdemar Castillo	PUP	2,464	47.83	+2.94
2008 general election Electorate: 5,432; Turnout: 4,625 (85.14%) −2.42	UDP gain from PUP; Majority: 454 (9.81%) +9.58	Nemencio Acosta	UDP	2,530	54.7	+5.86
2008 general election Electorate: 5,432; Turnout: 4,625 (85.14%) −2.42	UDP gain from PUP; Majority: 454 (9.81%) +9.58	Valdemar Castillo	PUP	2,076	44.89	−4.18
2003 general election Electorate: 3,987; Turnout: 3,491 (87.56%) −6.8	PUP hold Majority: 8 (0.23%) −25.26	Valdemar Castillo	PUP	1,713	49.07	−13.19
2003 general election Electorate: 3,987; Turnout: 3,491 (87.56%) −6.8	PUP hold Majority: 8 (0.23%) −25.26	Nemencio Acosta	UDP	1,705	48.84	+12.07
2003 general election Electorate: 3,987; Turnout: 3,491 (87.56%) −6.8	PUP hold Majority: 8 (0.23%) −25.26	Felipe Tzul	Independent	56	1.6	-
1998 general election Electorate: 3,052; Turnout: 2,880 (94.36%) +10.33	PUP hold Majority: 734 (25.49%) +7.29	Valdemar Castillo	PUP	1,793	62.26	+3.16
1998 general election Electorate: 3,052; Turnout: 2,880 (94.36%) +10.33	PUP hold Majority: 734 (25.49%) +7.29	Guadalupe Longsworth	UDP	1,059	36.77	−4.13
1993 general election Electorate: 3,413; Turnout: 2,868 (84.03%) −2.28	PUP hold Majority: 524 (18.2%) +8.2	Valdemar Castillo	PUP	1,696	59.1	+4.7
1993 general election Electorate: 3,413; Turnout: 2,868 (84.03%) −2.28	PUP hold Majority: 524 (18.2%) +8.2	Guadalupe Longsworth	UDP	1,172	40.9	−3.5
1989 general election Electorate: 2,922; Turnout: 2,522 (86.31%) +1.56	PUP hold Majority: 252 (10.0%) +9.5	Valdemar Castillo	PUP	1,371	54.4	+4.8
1989 general election Electorate: 2,922; Turnout: 2,522 (86.31%) +1.56	PUP hold Majority: 252 (10.0%) +9.5	Richard Quan	UDP	1,119	44.4	−4.7
1984 general election Electorate: 2,157; Turnout: 1,828 (84.75%) −6.45	PUP hold Majority: 0.5% (−7.8)	Valdemar Castillo	PUP		49.6	−3.8
1984 general election Electorate: 2,157; Turnout: 1,828 (84.75%) −6.45	PUP hold Majority: 0.5% (−7.8)	Richard Quan	UDP		49.1	+4.0
1979 general election Electorate: 3,843; Turnout: 3,505 (91.2%) +17.78	PUP hold Majority: 8.3% (+7.5)	Valdemar Castillo	PUP		53.4	+8.6
1979 general election Electorate: 3,843; Turnout: 3,505 (91.2%) +17.78	PUP hold Majority: 8.3% (+7.5)	Javier Castillo	UDP		45.1	-
1974 general election Electorate: 2,310; Turnout: 1,696 (73.42%) +2.32	PUP hold Majority: 0.8% (−43.1)	Vildo Marin	PUP		44.8	−15.8
1974 general election Electorate: 2,310; Turnout: 1,696 (73.42%) +2.32	PUP hold Majority: 0.8% (−43.1)	Edwardo Tillett	CUF		44.0	-
1974 general election Electorate: 2,310; Turnout: 1,696 (73.42%) +2.32	PUP hold Majority: 0.8% (−43.1)	Santiago Ricalde	Independent		7.4	-
1974 general election Electorate: 2,310; Turnout: 1,696 (73.42%) +2.32	PUP hold Majority: 0.8% (−43.1)	Ernest Hall	Independent		2.4	-
1969 general election Electorate: 1,617; Turnout: 1,149 (71.1%) +2.54	PUP hold Majority: 43.9% (−1.4)	Santiago Ricalde	PUP		60.6	−9.8
1969 general election Electorate: 1,617; Turnout: 1,149 (71.1%) +2.54	PUP hold Majority: 43.9% (−1.4)	Gualberto Martinez Jr.	NIP		16.7	−8.4
1965 general election Electorate: 1,797; Turnout: 1,232 (68.56%) −8.9	PUP hold Majority: 45.3% (−16.5)	Santiago Ricalde	PUP		70.4	−9.5
1965 general election Electorate: 1,797; Turnout: 1,232 (68.56%) −8.9	PUP hold Majority: 45.3% (−16.5)	Gualberto Martinez Sr.	NIP		25.1	+7.0
1961 general election Electorate: 1,473; Turnout: 1,141 (77.46%) n/a	PUP win Majority: 61.8% (n/a)	Santiago Ricalde	PUP		79.9	-
1961 general election Electorate: 1,473; Turnout: 1,141 (77.46%) n/a	PUP win Majority: 61.8% (n/a)	Gualberto Martinez	NIP		18.1	-
