= Caribbean Shores =

Electoral constituency in Belize

- Constituency for the Belize House of Representatives
- District: Belize
- Electorate: 5,440 (2015)
- Major settlements: Belize City (part)

Current constituency
- Created: 1984
- Party: People's United Party
- Area Representative: Kareem Musa

Caribbean Shores is an electoral constituency in the Belize District represented in the House of Representatives of the National Assembly of Belize since 2015 by Kareem Musa of the People's United Party.

== Profile ==
The Caribbean Shores constituency was one of 10 new seats created for the 1984 general election. Caribbean Shores occupies the north end of the peninsula Belize City sits on, bordered by the Freetown and Fort George constituencies to the south. The constituency has an extensive shoreline on the Caribbean Sea, hence its name.

Former Prime Minister Manuel Esquivel represented Caribbean Shores from 1984 to 1998.

== Area representatives ==
Election	Area representative	Party
1984	Manuel Esquivel	UDP
1989	Manuel Esquivel	UDP
1993	Manuel Esquivel	UDP
1998	Jose Coye	PUP
2003	Jose Coye	PUP
2008	Carlos Perdomo	UDP
2012	Santino Castillo	UDP
2015	Kareem Musa	PUP
2020	Kareem Musa	PUP
2025	Kareem Musa	PUP

== Elections ==
Election	Political result	Candidate	Party	Votes	%	±%
2025 general election Electorate: 4,383; Turnout: 2,505 (57.15%) −28.25	PUP hold Majority: 1,596 (63.72%) +44.52	Kareem Musa	PUP	2,194	59.60	+21.24
2025 general election Electorate: 4,383; Turnout: 2,505 (57.15%) −28.25	PUP hold Majority: 1,596 (63.72%) +44.52	Andrew Leo Bradley	UDP	320	12.77	−27.63
2025 general election Electorate: 4,383; Turnout: 2,505 (57.15%) −28.25	PUP hold Majority: 1,596 (63.72%) +44.52	Tyrone Louriano	UDP	109	4.35	-36.05
2020 general election Electorate: 4,363; Turnout: 3,726 (85.40%) +19.68	PUP hold Majority: 707 (19.20%) +20.79	Kareem Musa	PUP	2,194	59.60	+9.41
2020 general election Electorate: 4,363; Turnout: 3,726 (85.40%) +19.68	PUP hold Majority: 707 (19.20%) +20.79	Lee Mark Chang	UDP	1,487	40.40	−8.20
2015 general election Electorate: 5,440; Turnout: 3,541 (65.09%) −0.63	PUP gain from UDP; Majority: 56 (1.59%) +21.69	Kareem Musa	PUP	1,777	50.19	+10.79
2015 general election Electorate: 5,440; Turnout: 3,541 (65.09%) −0.63	PUP gain from UDP; Majority: 56 (1.59%) +21.69	Darrell Bradley	UDP	1,721	48.60	−10.90
2012 general election Electorate: 5,117; Turnout: 3,363 (65.72%) −7.77	UDP hold Majority: 676 (20.1%) −11.53	Santino Castillo	UDP	2,001	59.5	−5.94
2012 general election Electorate: 5,117; Turnout: 3,363 (65.72%) −7.77	UDP hold Majority: 676 (20.1%) −11.53	David Hoy	PUP	1,325	39.4	+5.59
2008 general election Electorate: 4,564; Turnout: 3,354 (73.49%) −1.61	UDP gain from PUP; Majority: 1,061 (31.63%) +26.28	Carlos Perdomo	UDP	2,195	65.44	+18.51
2008 general election Electorate: 4,564; Turnout: 3,354 (73.49%) −1.61	UDP gain from PUP; Majority: 1,061 (31.63%) +26.28	Jose Coye	PUP	1,134	33.81	−18.47
2003 general election Electorate: 4,022; Turnout: 3,021 (75.1%) −14.86	PUP hold Majority: 163 (5.35%) −6.69	Jose Coye	PUP	1,592	52.28	−3.34
2003 general election Electorate: 4,022; Turnout: 3,021 (75.1%) −14.86	PUP hold Majority: 163 (5.35%) −6.69	Oscar Ayuso	UDP	1,429	46.93	+3.35
1998 general election Electorate: 3,058; Turnout: 2,751 (89.96%) +23.57	PUP gain from UDP; Majority: 331 (12.04%) +10.44	Jose Coye	PUP	1,530	55.62	+6.42
1998 general election Electorate: 3,058; Turnout: 2,751 (89.96%) +23.57	PUP gain from UDP; Majority: 331 (12.04%) +10.44	Manuel Esquivel	UDP	1,199	43.58	−7.22
1998 general election Electorate: 3,058; Turnout: 2,751 (89.96%) +23.57	PUP gain from UDP; Majority: 331 (12.04%) +10.44	Marilyn Pollard	PDP	15	0.55	-
1993 general election Electorate: 3,901; Turnout: 2,590 (66.39%) +3.6	UDP hold Majority: 40 (1.6%) −8.8	Manuel Esquivel	UDP	1,315	50.8	−4.0
1993 general election Electorate: 3,901; Turnout: 2,590 (66.39%) +3.6	UDP hold Majority: 40 (1.6%) −8.8	Jose Coye	PUP	1,275	49.2	+4.8
1989 general election Electorate: 2,779; Turnout: 1,745 (62.79%) −5.5	UDP hold Majority: 182 (10.4%) −22.4	Manuel Esquivel	UDP	957	54.8	−11.2
1989 general election Electorate: 2,779; Turnout: 1,745 (62.79%) −5.5	UDP hold Majority: 182 (10.4%) −22.4	Louis Humbhreys	PUP	775	44.4	+11.2
1984 general election Electorate: 2,211; Turnout: 1,510 (68.29%) n/a	UDP win Majority: 476 (32.8%) n/a	Manuel Esquivel	UDP	977	66.0	-
1984 general election Electorate: 2,211; Turnout: 1,510 (68.29%) n/a	UDP win Majority: 476 (32.8%) n/a	Louis Humbhreys	PUP	501	33.2	-
1984 general election Electorate: 2,211; Turnout: 1,510 (68.29%) n/a	UDP win Majority: 476 (32.8%) n/a	E. Meighan	Independent	2	0.1	-

National Assembly of Belize
Preceded by Freetown	Constituency represented by the prime minister 1984–1989	Succeeded by Pickstock
Preceded by Corozal South East	Constituency represented by the leader of the opposition 1989–1993	Succeeded by Pickstock
Preceded by Pickstock	Constituency represented by the prime minister 1993–1998	Succeeded by Fort George
