= Order of Belize =

Awarded by Belize
- Type: Order
- Eligibility: Heads of State whom Belize wishes to honour
- Chancellor: The Governor-General of Belize

Precedence
- Next (higher): Order of the National Hero
- Next (lower): Order of Distinction
- Ribbon bar of the order

The Order of Belize is the second highest honour awarded to foreigners in Belize by the government of Belize. It was instituted on 16 August 1991.

== Recipients ==
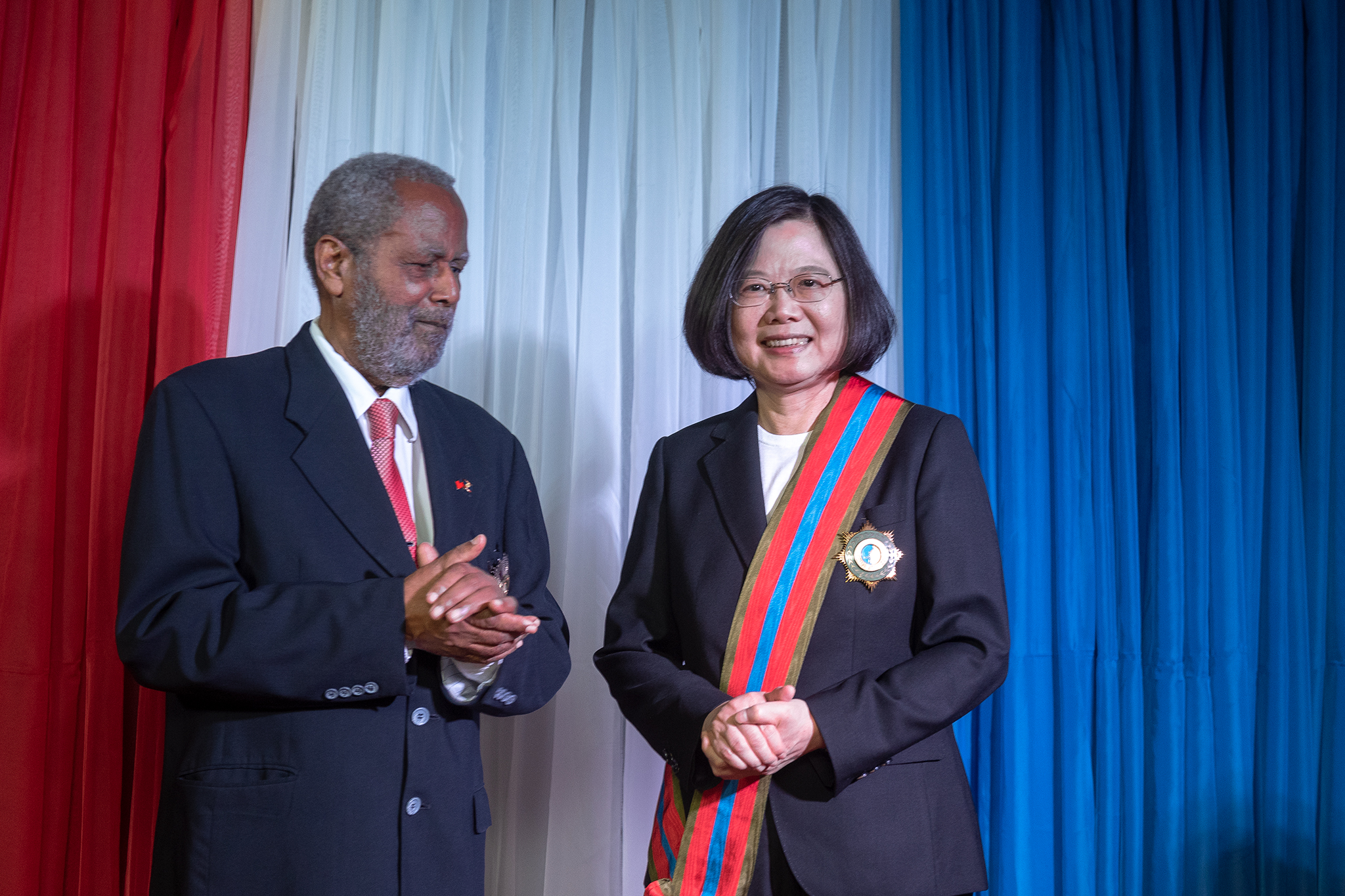
Order of Belize conferred on Taiwanese President Tsai Ing-wen by Governor-General Sir Colville Young

- Felipe Calderón
- Fidel Castro
- Vicente Fox
- Philip Goldson
- Ma Ying-jeou
- Letizia Moratti
- Carlos Salinas de Gortari
- Curl Thompson
- Tsai Ing-wen
