= Carlos Perdomo =

Belizean politician

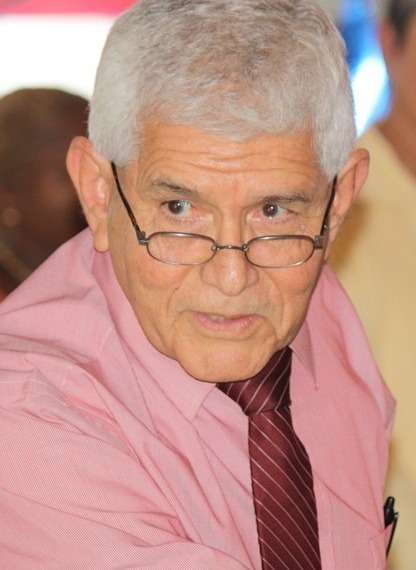
- Carlos Perdomo in 2019

Member of the Belize House of Representatives for Caribbean Shores
- In office 7 February 2008 – 7 March 2012
- Preceded by: Jose Coye
- Succeeded by: Santino Castillo

Personal details
- Party: United Democratic Party

Carlos Perdomo is a Belizean politician. He is the former Minister of National Security in Belize. In that capacity he was the cabinet secretary and thus deputized for the Governor-General Sir Colville Young.

Perdomo was elected to the Belize House of Representatives for Caribbean Shores in 2008, defeating PUP incumbent Jose Coye. He was not a candidate for re-election in 2012.
