= Thomas Ramos (disambiguation) =

Thomas Ramos (born 1995) is a French rugby union player.

Thomas Ramos may also refer to:

- Thomas Vincent Ramos (1887–1955), Belizean civil rights activist
- Thomas Ramos (soccer), American soccer player for Phoenix FC

== See also ==
- Tommy Ramos (born 1986), Puerto Rican gymnast
- Thomas Vincent Ramos Highway, a road in Belize
