= Curl Thompson =

Belizean politician

Deputy Prime Minister of Belize
- In office 15 December 1984 – 4 September 1989
- Prime Minister: Manuel Esquivel
- Preceded by: Florencio Marin
- Succeeded by: Florencio Marin

Leader of the Opposition
- In office January 1983 – 14 December 1984
- Monarch: Elizabeth II
- Governor General: Elmira Minita Gordon
- Prime Minister: George Cadle Price
- Preceded by: Theodore Aranda
- Succeeded by: Florencio Marin

Member of the Belize House of Representatives for Mesopotamia
- In office 21 November 1979 – 30 June 1993
- Preceded by: C. L. B. Rogers
- Succeeded by: Michael Finnegan

Personal details
- Born: 1934 (age 91–92)
- Party: United Democratic Party

Curl Osmond Thompson was a Belizean politician. Thompson served as an Area Representative in the Belize House of Representatives and as the deputy prime minister. He was also interim leader of the United Democratic Party for a brief period in the early 1980s.

== Biography ==
Thompson was born in 1934. He was the UDP's nominee for the Belize House in the Belize City-based Mesopotamia constituency in 1974, but was defeated by the People's United Party incumbent, C. L. B. Rogers. Thompson was elected to the seat in a 1979 rematch. In January 1983 Thompson became Leader of the Opposition upon Theodore Aranda's departure from the UDP, serving concurrently as interim party leader until Sen. Manuel Esquivel was elected as Aranda's permanent replacement, with Thompson becoming deputy party leader. Thompson served as Deputy Prime Minister and Minister of Home Affairs during the first Esquivel government from 1984 to 1989.

Thompson was posthumously awarded the Order of Belize in September 2010. Curl Thompson Street in Belize City and the Curl Thompson Building in Belmopan are named after him.
