= Florencio Marin =

Belizean politician

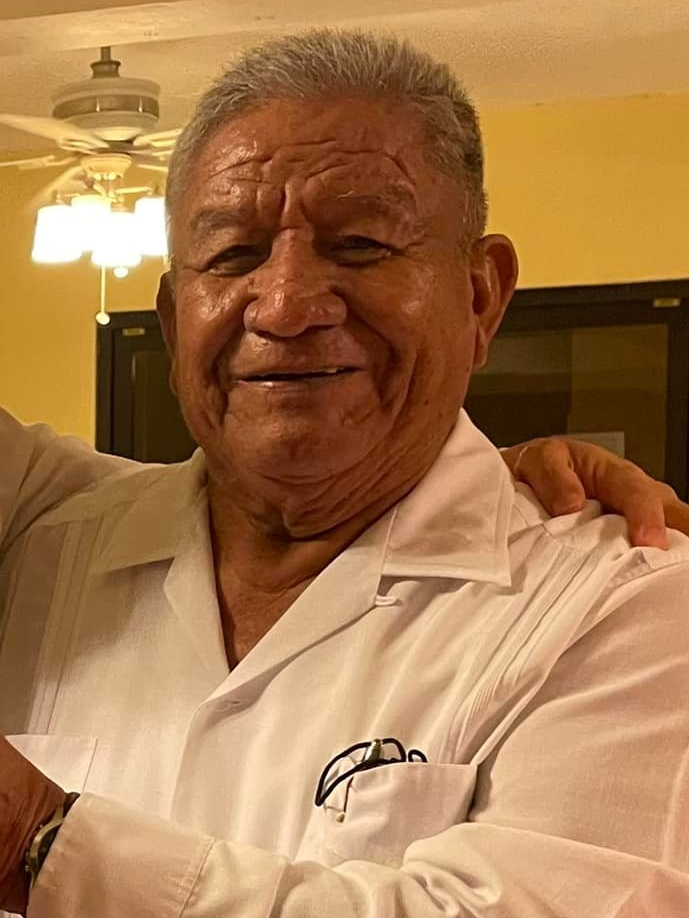

Leader of the Opposition
- In office 17 December 1984 – 7 September 1989
- Monarch: Elizabeth II
- Governor General: Elmira Minita Gordon
- Prime Minister: Manuel Esquivel
- Preceded by: Curl Thompson
- Succeeded by: Manuel Esquivel

Member of the Belize House of Representatives for Corozal South East
- In office 14 December 1984 – 7 February 2008
- Preceded by: (constituency created)
- Succeeded by: Florencio Julian Marin

Member of the Belize House of Representatives for Corozal South
- In office 1 March 1965 – 14 December 1984
- Preceded by: Jesus Ken
- Succeeded by: (constituency abolished)

Personal details
- Born: 1942 (age 83–84)
- Party: People's United Party
- Children: Florencio Marin Jr.

Florencio Marin is a retired Belizean politician. A veteran member of the People's United Party, Marin served as the deputy prime minister under George Cadle Price as well as the deputy leader of the Opposition.

== Biography ==
Marin was born in 1942. He entered politics in 1965 when the country was still known as British Honduras, winning a seat in the House of Representatives representing the Corozal District. Marin served continuously in the House until 2008 when he was succeeded by his son, Florencio Julian Marin.

A longtime deputy of Price in the PUP leadership, Marin served in several government posts under Price and later Said Musa. He was minister of agriculture from 1975 to 1979, minister of natural resources from 1979 to 1984. Marin became Deputy Leader of the Opposition and then Leader of the Opposition during the first Manuel Esquivel government after Price was unexpectedly defeated for re-election in December 1984. Price remained PUP leader during Marin's tenure as opposition leader and returned as prime minister in 1989, and Marin was appointed Deputy Prime Minister of Belize.

After Price stepped down as PUP leader in 1996, Marin stood for election to succeed him. However, he was defeated by Musa.

After leaving office, Marin along with fellow former Belizean Rep. Jose Coye was charged with conspiracy to "misappropriate the value of 56 parcels of land in the Caribbean Shores area." However, in February 2013 the Caribbean Court of Justice dismissed the case based on lack of evidence.
