= Cabinet of Belize =

Senior decision-making body of the Belizean government

The National Assembly, which is the Legislature of Belize, consists of three bodies: the Governor-General, the Senate and the House of Representatives. Presently, there are thirty-one elected Members of the House of Representatives. The party with the majority of seats in the House of Representatives forms the Government, the Executive branch which has direct control of the civil and military apparatus of state and makes day-to-day decisions on the management of those resources. The Executive is headed by the Prime Minister and his Cabinet. Members of the House of Representatives are elected in a general election under the provisions of the Representation of the People Act while the Members of the Senate are appointed by the Governor-General.

== Members ==
Ministry or Department	Minister	Ministerial title	Since
Office of the Prime Minister	The Hon. John Briceño	Prime Minister & Minister of Finance, Investment Economic Transformation, Civil Aviation & E-Governance	November 12, 2020
Deputy Prime Minister	The Hon. Cordel Hyde	Deputy Prime Minister, Minister of Natural Resources, Petroleum & Mining	November 13, 2020
Ministry of Foreign Affairs, Foreign Trade, Education, Culture, Science & Technology	The Hon. Francis Fonesca	Minister of Foreign Affairs, Foreign Trade, Education, Culture, Science & Technology	January 1, 2024
Ministry of Agriculture, Food Security & New Growth Industries	The Hon. Rodwell Fergunson	Minister of Agriculture, Food Security & New Growth Industries	November 18, 2025
Ministry of Infrastructure Development & Housing	The Hon. Julius Espat	Minister of Infrastructure Development & Housing	November 17, 2025
Ministry of Immigration, Labour & Governance	The Hon. Kareem Musa	Minister of Immigration, Labour & Governance	November 17, 2025
Ministry of Tourism, Youth, Sports & Diaspora Relations	The Hon. Anthony Mahler	Minister of Tourism, Youth, Sports & Diaspora Relations	November 13, 2020
Ministry of Health & Wellness	The Hon. Kevin Bernard	Minister of Health & Wellness	January 10, 2022
Ministry of Sustainable Development, Climate Change & Solid Waste Management	The Hon. Orlando Habet	Minister of Sustainable Development, Climate Change & Solid Waste Management	November 13, 2020
Ministry of Public Utilities and Logistics	The Hon. Michel Chebat	Minister of Public Utilities and Logistics	January 10, 2022
Ministry of Public Service & Disaster Risk Management	The Hon. Henry Charles Usher	Minister of Public Service & Disaster Risk Management	November 17, 2025
Ministry of Home Affairs & Enterprise	The Hon. Oscar Mira	Minister of Home Affairs & Enterprise	November 17, 2025
Ministry of Rural Transformation, Community Development & Local Government	The Hon. Oscar Requena	Minister of Rural Transformation, Community Development & Local Government	November 17, 2025
Ministry of Blue Economy & Marine Conservation	The Hon. Andre Perez	Minister of Blue Economy & Marine Conservation	April 3, 2024
Ministry of Indigenous, Constitution & Religious Affairs & Transport	The Hon. Dr. Louis Zabaneh	Minister of Indigenous, Constitution & Religious Affairs & Transport	November 17, 2025
Ministry of National Defence & Border Security	The Hon. Florencio Marin Jr.	Minister of National Defence & Border Security	November 13, 2020
Ministry of Human Development, Family Support & Gender Affairs	The Hon. Thea Ramirez	Minister of Human Development, Family Support & Gender Affairs	November 17, 2025
Attorney General	The Hon. Anthony Sylvester	Attorney General	November 17, 2025

=== Ministers of State ===
Ministry or department	Minister	Ministerial title	Constituencies
Office of the Prime Minister	The Hon. Dolores Balderamos Garcia	Sr. Minister of State in the Office of the Prime Minister	Belize Rural Central
Ministry of Economic Transformation	The Hon. Osmond Martinez	Minister of State in the Ministry of Economic Transformation	Toledo East
Ministry of Foreign Affairs & Foreign Trade	The Hon. Marconi Leal Jr.	Minister of State in the Ministry of Foreign Affairs & Foreign Trade	Belize Rural North
Ministry of Education, Science & Technology	The Hon. Ramon Cervantes	Minister of State in the Ministry of Education, Science & Technology	Orange Walk North
Ministry of Agriculture, Food Security & New Growth Industries	The Hon. Alex Balona	Minister of State in the Ministry of Agriculture, Food Security & New Growth Industries	Cayo Central
Ministry of Youth & Sports	The Hon. Devin Daly	Minister of State in the Ministry of Youth & Sports	Collet
Ministry of Sustainable Development, Climate Change & Solid Waste Management	The Hon. Ramiro Ramirez	Minister of State in the Ministry of Sustainable Development, Climate Change & Solid Waste Management	Corozal South West
Ministry of Public Utilities, Energy & Logistics	The Hon. Gilroy Usher	Minister of State in the Ministry of Public Utilities, Energy & Logistics	Port Loyola

== See also ==
- List of government ministries of Belize
