= Michael Finnegan (Belizean politician) =

Belizean politician

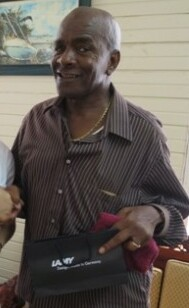
- Finnegan in 2014

Member of the Belize House of Representatives for Mesopotamia
- In office 30 June 1993 – 11 November 2020
- Preceded by: Curl Thompson
- Succeeded by: Moses Barrow

Personal details
- Born: Michael Myvett c. 1951 (age 74–75) British Honduras (now Belize)
- Party: United Democratic Party (1973–present); United Black Association for Development (1970–1972)

Michael Kwame Finnegan (born Michael Myvett, c.1951) is a Belizean politician and a member of the United Democratic Party. He served as Minister of Housing and Urban Development in Prime Minister Dean Barrow's cabinet. He was a member of the House of Representatives, representing the Mesopotamia Electoral Division in Belize City from 1993 to 2020. Finnegan hosts the television show Mek Wave and Lik Road.

== Early life ==
Michael Myvett was born around 1951, and grew up in Belize City. He has one sister.

== Political career ==
As a young activist in 1969, Michael Myvett protested the Vietnam War conducted by the United States, while affiliated with the Ad Hoc Committee for the Truth About Vietnam. This group was co-founded by Said Musa, a future Prime Minister. In 1970, Finnegan became a member of the United Black Association for Development. By late 1972 he had become estranged from UBAD president Evan X Hyde. During this period he changed his name to Michael Kwame Finnegan.

Finnegan then became a political protege of Dean Lindo, an early UDP leader. He was a founding member of the UDP in 1973. Finnegan already had a reputation as a gifted street campaigner. He worked as a UDP activist throughout the rest of the 1970s and 1980s.

Finnegan was first elected to office in 1993, when he became a member of the Belize House of Representatives from the Mesopotamia constituency, a safe UDP seat in Belize City. Finnegan was one of only two UDP House members re-elected in 1998 (Dean Barrow, a future Prime Minister, was the other); they were two of three successful UDP candidates nationwide. Until his 2020 retirement, Finnegan was re-elected with at least 60 percent of the vote in every ensuing election.

In the Belize House, Finnegan was noted for his lively, uncensored debate style as well as his liberal use of Belizean Creole.

Finnegan declined to be a candidate in the 2020 Belizean general election. The UDP nominated his nephew, Shyne Barrow, to succeed him in the Mesopotamia constituency, which is widely considered a UDP safe seat. Barrow was elected with 53% of the vote.

=== Health ===
There had been speculation that an ailing Finnegan would stand down at the 2015 general election. In March 2015 Finnegan told Tropical Vision Limited that he was "worn" and considering retirement. However, in September 2015, Finnegan confirmed he was running for re-election. Former Belize City Mayor Zenaida Moya may seek to succeed Finnegan in Mesopotamia should he stand down in the future.

Finnegan was successfully treated for prostate cancer in 2010. He underwent spinal surgery in the United States in 2014.

== Family ==
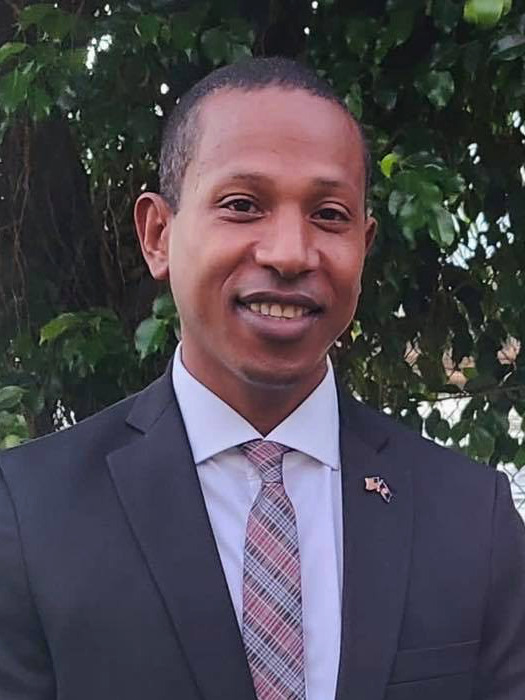
Shyne Barrow

Finnegan's sister Frances Imeon Myvett is the mother of rapper Shyne (then known as Jamal Michael Barrow). Finnegan's friend Dean Barrow is Jamal's father. Finnegan raised Jamal from the age of three to eight, after the boy's mother Frances had immigrated to New York City for work. The boy joined her there, and they lived in Brooklyn, where he later started his music career. Shyne was convicted of assault in a 1999 nightclub shooting in New York City, and the rapper served a nine-year sentence in prison. Afterward the United States deported him to his birthplace of Belize, as he had never become a naturalized citizen.

He has since changed his name to Moses Michael Levi Barrow. He was elected to the Belize House of Representatives with the center-right Belize United Democratic Party in the Belize City-based Mesopotamia constituency in the 2020 Belizean general election. He was subsequently also appointed the Opposition Leader in the House of Representatives and the leader of the Belize United Democratic Party, in both June 2021 (until September 2021) and February 2022.
