= Florencio Marin Jr. =

Hon. Florencio Marin Jr.

Minister of National Defense and Border Security
- In office 18 November 2025 - 2 July 2026
- In office November 2020 – 15 March 2025
- Prime Minister: Johnny Briceño

Minister of Rural Transformation, Community Development, Labour and Local Government
- In office 15 March 2025 – 11 November 2025
- Prime Minister: Johnny Briceño

Minister of Public Service and Disaster Risk Management
- In office 11 November 2025 – 18 November 2026
- Prime Minister: Johnny Briceño

Member of the Belize House of Representatives for Corozal South East
- In office 7 February 2008 – present
- Preceded by: Florencio Marin Sr.

Personal details
- Parent: Florencio Marin Sr.

Florencio Julian Marin Jr. is a Belizean politician and former military officer. He is a member of the People's United Party and has represented the constituency of Corozal South East since the 2008 general election. Marin also served as Minister of National Defense and Border Security from 2020 until March 2025, and again briefly from November 2025 until 2026.

== Biography ==
Marin is the son of politician Florencio Marin Sr., who represented the same Corozal South East constituency, and it's preceding Corozal South constituency, from 1965 until 2008, and who also served as both Leader of the Opposition and Deputy Prime Minister at various times. After graduating from St. John's College, Marin studied business administration at Loyola University, New Orleans. Marin then pursued his military career, serving as an officer in the Belize Defence Forces after passing out of the Royal Military Academy Sandhurst in 1995. Afterwards, he graduated with a Master of Business Administration from the University of Bath. Marin had a brief career in education, teaching at St John's College and Galen University.

In 2008, Marin was elected to succeed his father as the representative for Corozal South East. Following the PUP's win in the 2020 general election, he was appointed Minister of National Defense and Border Security. Following the 2025 general election, he was reassigned to the Ministry of Rural Transformation, Community Development, Labour and Local Government. On 11 November 2025, Marin was appointed Minister of Public Service and Disaster Risk Management, but just a week later he was reappointed to the defense brief. On 2 July 2026, Marin requested a 90 day leave of absence to allow for an audit into the ministry's activities from 2019-2026, amid suspicion over government contracts. Ultimately, Marin was not reinstated, and on 7 October that year his ministry was merged into the new Ministry of National Security, Energy and Ports, under Michel Chebat.
