= Belize Green Independent Party =

- Leader: Luis Blas Mendez, Sr.
- Founded: 23 December 2012
- Ideology: Green politics
- Colours: Green
- Seats in the Senate: 0 / 12
- Seats in the House: 0 / 31
- Local government: 0 / 67

The Belize Green Independent Party (BGIP) is an ecologist political party in Belize. Founded in 2012, BGIP has yet to win a seat in the Belize House or a municipal election at the city or town level. BGIP is one of the few Green parties in the world unafilliated with the Global Greens.

BGIP formally contested an election for the first time in 2015, fielding a candidate at the 8 July 2015 Belize House by-election in Dangriga. However, the party's candidate, Llewellyn Lucas, finished a distant third with 14 votes (0.37%).

In the 2015 general election, Llewellyn Lucas ran as a candidate for the Toledo East House seat. Lucas finished fourth with 5 votes (0.09%).
