= San Joaquín, Corozal =

San Joaquín
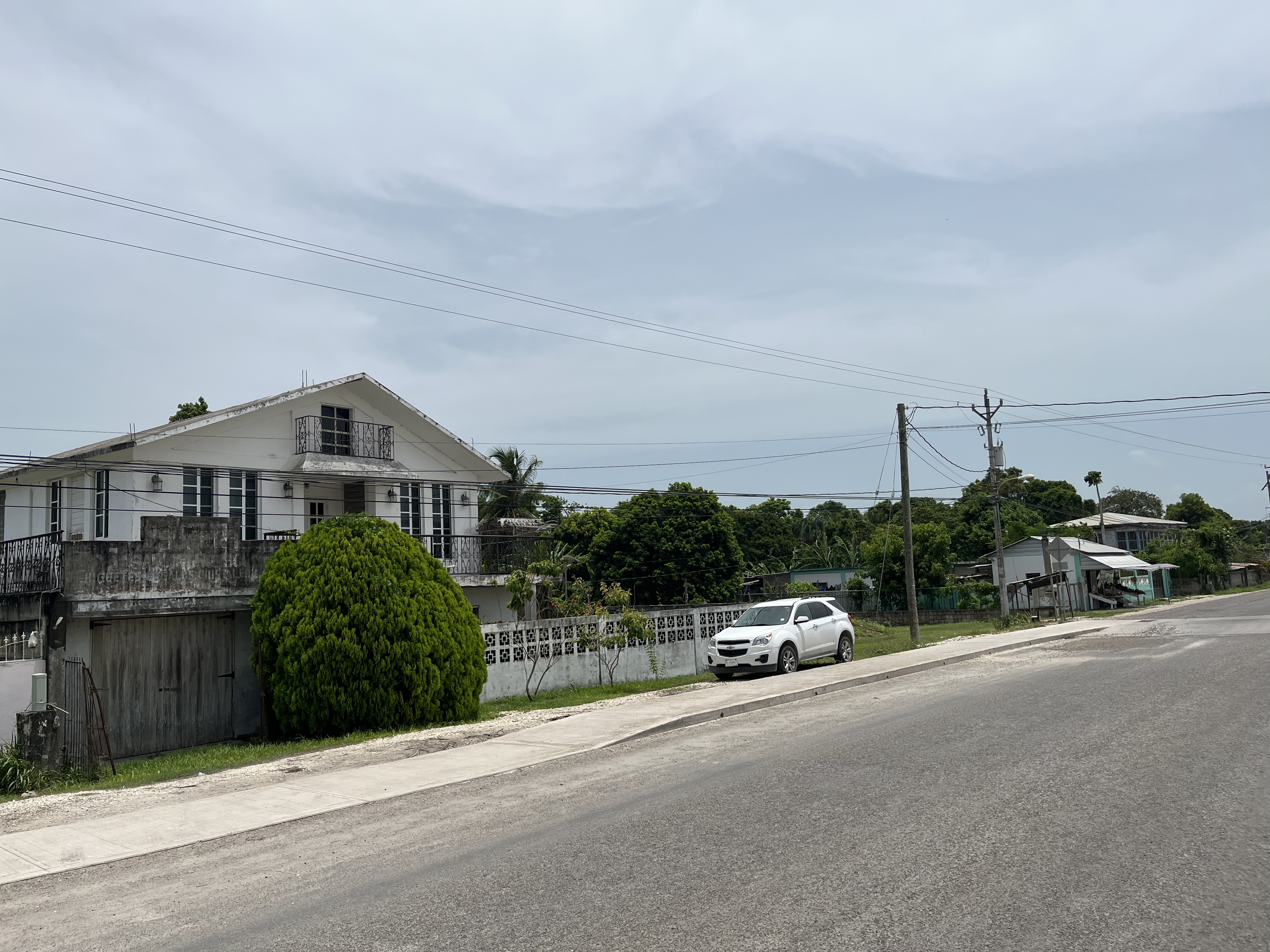

- Location within Belize
- Coordinates: 18°20′N 88°26′W
- Country: Belize
- District: Corozal District
- Constituency: Corozal South East
- Named for: San Joaquín

Government
  - Type: Village Council
  - Chairman: Florencio Javier Martinez

Population
  - Total: 1,528
- Time zone: UTC-6 (Central)

San Joaquín is a village in the Corozal District of Belize. It is one of the largest villages in Corozal. The town was formed as a result of Mestizos migrating to escape the 1847–1901 Caste War of Yucatán.

== Demographics ==
At the time of the 2010 census, San Joaquín had a population of 1,470. Of those, 94.9% were Mestizo, 2.3% Mixed, 0.9% East Indian, 0.7% Creole, 0.5% Yucatec Maya, 0.3% Asian, 0.2% Mennonite, 0.1% Caucasian and 0.1% Garifuna.

In terms of languages spoken (multiple answers allowed), 98.5% spoke Spanish, 65.3% English, 4.1% Creole, 0.7% Yucatec Maya, 0.4% Mandarin or Cantonese, 0.1% Garifuna, 0.1% German and 0.1% Ketchi Maya; 0.1% could not speak.
