= Ivan Ramos =

Belizean politician (died 2024)

Member of the Belize House of Representatives for Dangriga
- In office 7 March 2012 – 8 June 2015
- Preceded by: Arthur Roches
- Succeeded by: Frank Mena

Personal details
- Died: September 2024
- Party: People's United Party

Ivan Michael "Maca" Ramos (died September 2024) was a Belizean politician and a member of the People's United Party (PUP). He was elected in March 2012 as Area Representative for the Dangriga constituency in the Stann Creek District.

In June 2015 Ramos resigned after controversially failing to retain his standard bearer status in Dangriga for the 2015 general election. A by-election to succeed Ramos was held on 8 July.

Ramos was a grandson of 20th-century Garifuna activist T. V. Ramos. He died in September 2024.
