= Tracy Panton =

Belizean politician

The Honourable Tracy Panton
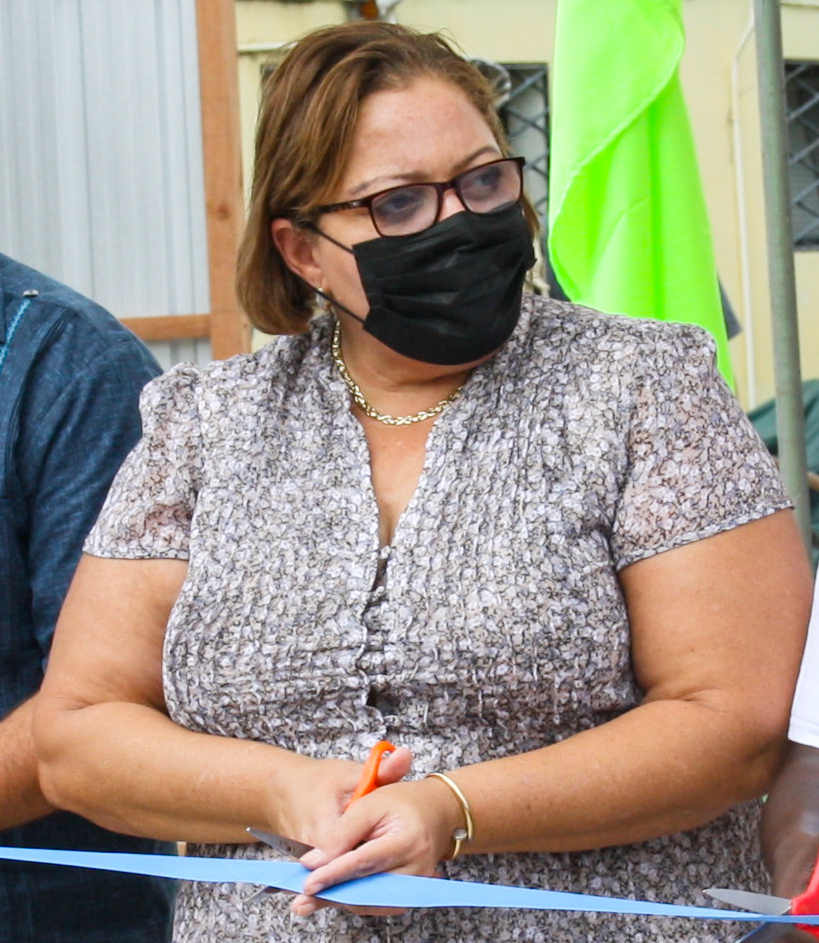

Leader of the Opposition
- Incumbent
- Assumed office March 14, 2025
- Prime Minister: Johnny Briceño
- Preceded by: Shyne Barrow

Member of the Belize House of Representatives for Albert
- Incumbent
- Assumed office November 4, 2015
- Preceded by: Herman R. Longsworth

Personal details
- Party: United Democratic

Tracy Taegar Panton is a Belizean politician. A member of the United Democratic Party, she has represented the Albert constituency in the Belize House of Representatives since 2015.

Her father, Dr Leroy Taegar, was a council candidate for the PUP in 1977. Before running for parliament Panton had a career in the tourism industry in Belize. She spent 12 years as the director of the Belize Tourism Board before leaving in 2009. In 2012 she was appointed chief executive of the Ministry of Tourism and Culture, a post she held until being selected for the Albert seat in 2015.

In 2022 Panton ran for the leadership of the UDP, and lost against Shyne Barrow.

The 2025 election had two sets of UDP candidates, some around leader Barrow, and others around Panton. Panton's faction defeated Barrow in his Mesopotamia seat, making Panton the new leader of the opposition. On Friday 14 March 2025 she officially became the leader of the opposition, the first female politician to hold that position.
