= Jose Coye =

Belizean politician

Member of the Belize House of Representatives for Caribbean Shores
- In office 27 August 1998 – 7 February 2008
- Preceded by: Manuel Esquivel
- Succeeded by: Carlos Perdomo

Personal details
- Born: 1942 (age 83–84)
- Party: People's United Party

Jose Coye (born 1942) is a Belizean politician and a member of the People's United Party (PUP). He trained as a Chartered Accountant and worked as a customs officer before going into politics.

Coye was mayor of Belize City from 1995 until 1998, and was a founding member of the Belize Mayors Association. He was elected to the Belize House of Representatives in 1998 from the Caribbean Shores constituency of Belize District, defeating incumbent Prime Minister Manuel Esquivel.

In 2004, Coye was among seven ministers who resigned from Prime Minister Said Musa's cabinet over a funding dispute involving social security money. However, Coye was reinstated to cabinet after negotiations with the prime minister and other ministers of government. In the 2008 election, Coye was defeated by Carlos Perdomo (UDP) in Caribbean Shores. Coye lost his bid for the division in April 2011 after he was defeated by Mr. Anthony Mahler in a PUP constituency convention.

After leaving office, Coye along with fellow former Belizean Rep. Florencio Marin, Sr. was charged with conspiracy to "misappropriate the value of 56 parcels of land in the Caribbean Shores area." However, in February 2013 the Caribbean Court of Justice threw out the case based on lack of evidence.
