= Kareem Musa =

Belizean politician

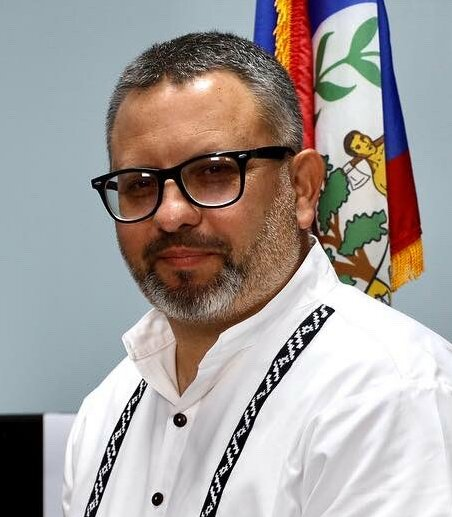
- Musa in 2022

Member of the Belize House of Representatives for Caribbean Shores
- Incumbent
- Assumed office 4 November 2015
- Preceded by: Santino Castillo

Personal details
- Born: Belize
- Party: People's United Party
- Education: Louisiana State University

Kareem Musa is a Belizean politician. A member of the People's United Party, he has represented the Caribbean Shores constituency in the Belize House since 2015. Also, he is the minister of the Ministry of Home Affairs & New Growth Industries. He is the son of former Prime Minister of Belize Said Musa.

== Early life and education ==
An avid tennis player in his youth, he won the under-14 and under-18 national boys titles in the sport. He went to St. John's High School in Belize City.

He then attended university in the United States and graduated from Louisiana State University (LSU) with a degree in Sociology with emphasis on Criminology. He attended Law School at the University of the West Indies (Barbados) and Norman Manley Law School (Jamaica). He graduated from Norman Manley Law School with Honors and immediately took up practice in criminal, civil, corporate and real estate law at the Law Firm of Musa & Balderamos.

== Political career ==
From a very young age, Kareem was interested in the justice system and representing those who were less fortunate. Active in politics since 1996, he decided to throw his hat in the ring in 2014, and in 2015 pulled off an incredible win in that division. He has never stopped serving the people or his Party and became the Deputy Leader of the East shortly after his victory in 2015. He served as a shadow Minister for the Attorney-General's Ministry and Public Utilities until the 2020 Belizean general election. He currently serves as Ministry of Home Affairs & New Growth Industries.
