= C. L. B. Rogers =

Belizean politician and diplomat

Member of the Belize House of Representatives for Mesopotamia
- In office 26 March 1961 – 21 November 1979

Personal details
- Born: January 25, 1928 Tela, Honduras
- Died: July 25, 1996 (aged 68) Belize City, Belize
- Party: People's United Party (after 1961); National Independence Party (1958–1961)
- Known for: Founding member of NIP; Key figure in Belize’s path to independence Deputy Prime Minister and UN Permanent Representative

Carl Lindbergh Bernard Rogers (25 January 1928 – 25 July 1996), commonly known as C. L. B. Rogers, was a Belizean politician, government minister, and diplomat. He played a key role in Belize’s political development before and after independence.

== Early life ==
Rogers's birth date is confirmed as 25 January 1928. He was allegedly born in Tela, Honduras, though all passenger and immigration records — including his arrival in Florida at age 16 — list his birthplace as British Honduras (now Belize). He was raised by his mother, Jane Messam. Educated through Standard 6 at Wesley Primary School, Rogers continued his education informally, becoming known for his intelligence and public-speaking ability.

== Political career ==
Rogers was a founding member of the National Independence Party in 1958, winning a seat on the Belize City Council under its banner in December of that year.

A member of the People’s United Party after 1961, Rogers was first elected to the British Honduras Legislative Assembly (now the Belize House of Representatives) in 1961 from the Belize City-based Mesopotamia constituency. A close political ally of PUP leader and Premier George Cadle Price, Rogers served as Minister of Home Affairs and Deputy Premier. Known for his behind-the-scenes influence, Rogers was sometimes described as a “Godfather” of Belizean politics.

He was defeated for re-election in 1979 by the United Democratic Party's Curl Thompson.

== Diplomatic career and later life ==
After leaving office, Rogers served as the Belizean ambassador to the United Nations.

He died on 25 July 1996 in Belize City at the age of 68.

== Electoral history ==
- 1958 – Elected to Belize City Council (NIP)
- 1961 – Elected to British Honduras Legislative Assembly for Mesopotamia (PUP)
- 1961–1979 – Held Cabinet positions including Deputy Premier
- 1979 – Lost Mesopotamia seat to Curl Thompson (UDP)
