= National Garifuna Council =

The National Garifuna Council (NGC) of Belize is a non-governmental organization (NGO) that represents the Garifuna people of Belize. It was established in 1981 and is managed by a board of directors with affiliate branches in Guatemala, Honduras, and Nicaragua. These countries all share the unique Garifuna culture, as they all served as refuges to the Garifuna people when they were exiled from their homeland, St. Vincent.

== History ==
The first Garinagu arrived in Belize in 1802, and larger numbers arrived in 1832. As a result of the free status of the Garinagu in a settlement whose black population was still enslaved, conflict arose between them and the white land owners. They disallowed contact between the slaves and the Garinagu, and tried to keep the Garinagu from advancing within the community. Despite such efforts, in 1922 the Carib Development Society (CDS) was formed through the efforts of Thomas Vincent Ramos in Dangriga Town. Its purpose was to help the sick and offer financial support to those in need of it. After his death, the work was taken up by a group of people known as the National Garifuna Council (NGC) along with the Carib Development Society. In 1981, the NGC outlined its objectives in its Memorandum of Association (Constitution).

== Structure ==
Any individual who reaches the age of 15 can become a member after subscribing and paying an entrance fee. NGC is managed by a board of directors consisting of between 15 and 30 members, who are responsible for registering and keeping records of members. The headquarters is situated in Dangriga Town, in Stann Creek District, Belize. An annual convention is held once every year.

== Policies and initiatives ==
On April 12, 1997, the anniversary of the arrival of the Garifuna people in Central America was celebrated. This event brought about awareness of the circumstances surrounding their exile from their homeland, St. Vincent, such as the real reason for the attempted genocide and their appreciation for survival. The mere fact that they survived such inhumane treatment and managed to exist today brought them to the realization that their culture is threatened.

The National Garifuna Council prepared a draft Language Policy Statement of the Garifuna Nation for the Central American Black Organization (CABO) meeting that was to be held in December 1997. The draft outlined the reason for and the request for a language policy and development initiatives, as well as for the rights of the indigenous people to be guaranteed by the local governments of Belize, Guatemala, Honduras and Nicaragua, and declared by the United Nations. They also built the Pablo Lambey Garifuna Cultural Center in Dangriga. In the year 1999, NGC signed a memorandum of understanding between themselves and the Government of Belize.

NGC has completed a 2-year institutional strengthening project, which focused on providing technical support to build the capacity of the organization in order to fulfill its mandate. The objective was to develop the income generating potential of Garifuna communities and NGC itself while considering the culture for business opportunities, and to improve the socio-economic situation of most Garifuna communities. NGC also developed the Hamali Garinagu NGC Radio Station in Dangriga Town in the year 2002. In 2004, they opened the First Garifuna Museum in Belize located at the Monument Land. This museum was mainly financed by a grant from the Taiwan Government, assisted by the Government of Belize as well as private donors.

On September 11, 2007, the National Garifuna Council with the support of the Ministry of Education opened a new pre and primary school, named Gulisi Primary School. This school was named in honor of Gulisi, the daughter of the legendary Chief Joseph Chatoyer. At the school the students are taught equally in the native Garifuna language and English while carrying out the standard primary school curriculum of Belize.
