= Arturo Roches =

Belizean politician

Arturo Roches was a Belizean politician who represented Dangriga from 2008 until 2012. A member of the United Democratic Party, he was the Minister of State for Health in Belize. He died in late 2025, and a state funeral was held for him on 18 August 2025.
