= Manuel Esquivel =

Belizean politician (1940–2022)

The Right Honourable Sir Manuel Esquivel KCMG
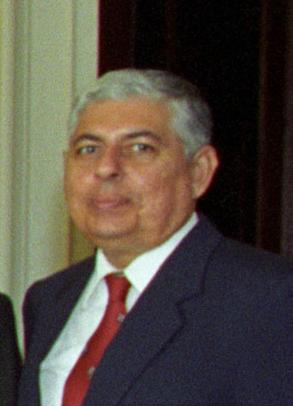
- Esquivel in 1993

2nd Prime Minister of Belize
- In office 17 December 1984 – 7 September 1989
- Monarch: Elizabeth II
- Governor General: Elmira Minita Gordon
- Deputy: Curl Thompson
- Preceded by: George Cadle Price
- Succeeded by: George Cadle Price
- In office 3 July 1993 – 30 August 1998
- Governors General: Elmira Minita Gordon; Colville Young
- Deputy: Dean Barrow
- Preceded by: George Cadle Price
- Succeeded by: Said Musa

Leader of the Opposition
- In office 7 September 1989 – 3 July 1993
- Prime Minister: George Cadle Price
- Preceded by: Florencio Marin
- Succeeded by: George Cadle Price

Member of the Belize House of Representatives for Caribbean Shores
- In office 14 December 1984 – 27 August 1998
- Preceded by: (constituency created)
- Succeeded by: Jose Coye

Personal details
- Born: 2 May 1940 Belize City, British Honduras (now Belize)
- Died: 10 February 2022 (aged 81) Belize City, Belize
- Party: United Democratic Party (1973–2022); Liberal Party (1969–1973)
- Spouse: Kathleen Levy (m. 1971)
- Children: 3

Sir Manuel Amadeo Esquivel KCMG, PC (2 May 1940 – 10 February 2022) was a Belizean politician. As leader of the United Democratic Party, he served as the second prime minister of Belize from 1984 to 1989, and then again from 1993 to 1998. His party's victory in 1984 was the first time an opposition party had won a general election in Belize.

== Early life ==
Esquivel was born in Belize City when it was the capital of the British Crown Colony of British Honduras. He attended St John's College and later earned a Bachelor of Science degree in physics at Loyola University New Orleans; he subsequently pursued a postgraduate certificate in physics education at Bristol University, England.

== Politics ==
After the 1969 British Honduras election, Esquivel became head of the pro-business Liberal Party, which later merged with two other parties in 1973 to form the United Democratic Party (UDP). He was elected to the Belize City Council for two terms, and served as UDP chairman from 1976 to 1982. In the 1979 election, Esquivel was the UDP nominee for the Belize House of Representatives in the Freetown constituency. He was defeated by the incumbent Premier of Belize George Cadle Price, leader of the People's United Party (PUP). Esquivel was then appointed a minority member of the Belize Senate. He defeated Philip Goldson for the open UDP leadership post in January 1983, becoming the first and thus far only politician to be elected leader of a major Belizean political party as a senator. Acting opposition leader Curl Thompson stayed on as the UDP's House leader until the following election.

Esquivel was elected in December 1984 to the House of Representatives from the newly formed constituency of Caribbean Shores in Belize City, becoming prime minister for the first time shortly thereafter. The UDP's victory was the first time an opposition party had won since the introduction of universal suffrage in 1954. He held the seat until the 1998 election, in which he was defeated by the PUP's Jose Coye.

Earlier in 1984, the Price government was faced with a financial crisis, and had nearly depleted its financial reserves. After increasing tax rates twice, they entered into a standby agreement with the International Monetary Fund (IMF). Upon becoming prime minister, Esquivel proceeded with economic reforms under the advice of domestic experts such as Edney Cain. Esquivel began moving the economy of Belize away from his predecessor's mixed economy model, encouraging foreign direct investment and the growth of tourism. In his second term, he implemented unpopular austerity measures such as public sector retrenchment. His government suspended pay raises from 1995 to 1997, but transferred 450,000 shares of Belize Telecommunications to a trust for the affected workers. The opposition PUP dubbed Esquivel as "VATMAN" for introducing a 15% value-added tax (VAT) in 1995. While Esquivel's successor Said Musa repealed the VAT in 1999, Musa introduced a similar 10% goods and services tax (GST) in 2005.

After the UDP won the February 2008 election, Esquivel was appointed by Prime Minister Dean Barrow as senior advisor to government with the rank of minister on 12 February 2008. He was also appointed Chairman of the Central Bank of Belize on 18 January 2011. He stepped down as Chairman in September 2013, and resigned from the Cabinet in March 2014.

Esquivel continued to provide opinions on public issues after retiring. Having served on the national flag design committee, he advocated for a standardized definition of the flag and the coat of arms. Although his government had opposed cannabis trafficking, Esquivel expressed support for decriminalization of small amounts in 2017. He published an editorial in the Amandala newspaper supporting the 2019 Belizean territorial dispute referendum. When the government began administering COVID-19 vaccine to citizens over 60, Esquivel and his wife were among the first recipients.

== Personal life ==
Esquivel met his future wife, Kathleen Levy, while he was studying in Bristol. They wed in 1971 and had three children: David, Laura, and Ruth. Laura followed in her father's footsteps as a public servant, serving as a Belize City councilor (2006-2012), Director of the Belize Tourism Board (2012-2014), and Deputy Chief of Mission at the Embassy of Belize in Washington, D.C.

Esquivel was a passenger in vehicle rollovers in 1996 and 2009 on the Western Highway. Both accidents were caused by wet road conditions. While he only sustained minor injuries from the first accident, Esquivel underwent facial surgery after the second.

Kathleen, Lady Esquivel, wrote a biography of Esquivel entitled Still Waters, which was published in 2021. Esquivel died on 10 February 2022, at the age of 81.

== Honours ==
Esquivel was appointed to the Privy Council of the United Kingdom by Queen Elizabeth II in 1986. This life-time appointment confers the title "Right Honourable". He also held an Honorary Doctorate of Humane Letters from Loyola University.

Esquivel was appointed Knight Commander of the Order of St Michael and St George (KCMG) in the 2010 New Year Honours.

In 2021, the Belize City Council renamed an overpass after Esquivel. The coastal road connecting Belize District and Stann Creek District is also named after him.

== See also ==
- Politics of Belize
- Ministry of Finance (Belize)

Political offices
| Preceded by George Cadle Price | Prime Minister of Belize; 1984–1989 | Succeeded by George Cadle Price |
| Preceded by George Cadle Price | Prime Minister of Belize; 1993–1998 | Succeeded by Said Musa |
