= Breaking Belize News =

Breaking Belize News, also known as BBN, is an online news outlet that provides breaking news on Belize, the Caribbean, and Central America.

According to BBN, an average of two million readers per year depend upon Breakingbelizenews.com for daily stories that pair local news with worldwide headlines.

BBN gets over 10 million page views annually and is becoming the fastest-growing media conduit in Belize.

The company was founded in 2013 by Larry Waight.
