= Thomas Vincent Ramos =

Belizean activist (1887–1955)

- Born: 17 September 1887; Puerto Cortés, Honduras
- Died: 13 November 1955 (aged 68); Stann Creek Town, British Honduras (now Dangriga, Belize)
- Occupation: School teacher
- Known for: Civil rights activist, founder of Garifuna Settlement Day
- Relatives: Pi'erre Bourne

Thomas Vincent Ramos (17 September 1887 – 13 November 1955), commonly known as T. V. Ramos, was a Belizean civil rights activist who promoted the interests of the Garifuna people, and is now considered a national hero.

== Background ==
T. V. Ramos was born in Puerto Cortés, Honduras, on 17 September 1887 and was educated at Wesleyan Methodist primary schools in Stann Creek Town, British Honduras (now Dangriga, Belize), and Belize City. He took correspondence courses in business administration, public speaking, journalism and accountancy. Ramos married Elisa Marian Fuentes in 1914. He moved permanently to Stann Creek Town in 1923 but did not formally become a British subject until one year before his death in 1955.

== Social activist ==
After moving to British Honduras, Ramos became a school teacher. He was also a visionary leader. Concerned about the systematic neglect of health facilities for Garinagu in Stann Creek Town, he founded the Carib Development and Sick Aid Society and later the Carib International Society, which had affiliations in Guatemala and Honduras. The purpose of the Carib Development Society was to help the sick and to assist those who need financial assistance to bury their dead. The society owns 800 acres (3.2 km^{2}) of land that was called the Carib Reserve at Sarawee in the Stann Creek valley. He lobbied successfully for the colonial authorities to provide native Garifuna nurses in the local hospital. Ramos was a Methodist, a preacher, and wrote several Garifuna hymns. Some of them are sung each year at his memorial.

T. V. Ramos was a contemporary of Marcus Garvey, and was involved in Garvey's Universal Negro Improvement Association. He fought discrimination against Garifuna people, including all Afro-Belizeans. He was founder of the Independent Manhood and Exodus Uplift Society and the Colonial Industrial Instruction Association. He was a prolific contributor to the newspapers. For example, writing in the Belize Independent on 21 January 1942 Ramos complained of the brutality of some Wesleyan School teachers towards their students, and the immorality of some of the female pupil teachers.

In 1940, as leader and spokesman of the Garifuna people along with Pantaleon Hernandez and Domingo Ventura he approached the governor of the colony and asked for establishment of a public and bank holiday to observe the Garifuna arrival in Belize. The request was granted and the Carib Disembarkation Day, later named Garifuna Settlement Day, was first celebrated in Stann Creek District on 19 November 1941. The holiday was recognized in Toledo District in 1943 and throughout the country in 1977.

== Legacy ==
Ramos died on 13 November 1955 and was put to rest the following day. Since 1956, A torchlight parade has been held on 13 November every year in honor of his contributions to Belize and to his people. The parade is part of the week-long lead-up to the Garifuna Settlement Day that he established, which includes selection of Miss Garifuna, parades and special church services, and The T. V. Ramos Classic Bike Race. His granddaughter Adele Ramos published a biography of T. V. Ramos in 2000. A statue of Thomas Vincent Ramos stands at the junction of Commerce and Front Streets in Dangriga.

Ivan Ramos, a grandson, served as a member of the Belize House of Representatives from Dangriga from 2012 to 2015.
