= Colville Young =

Governor-General of Belize from 1993 to 2021

The Right Honourable Sir Colville Young GCMG MBE
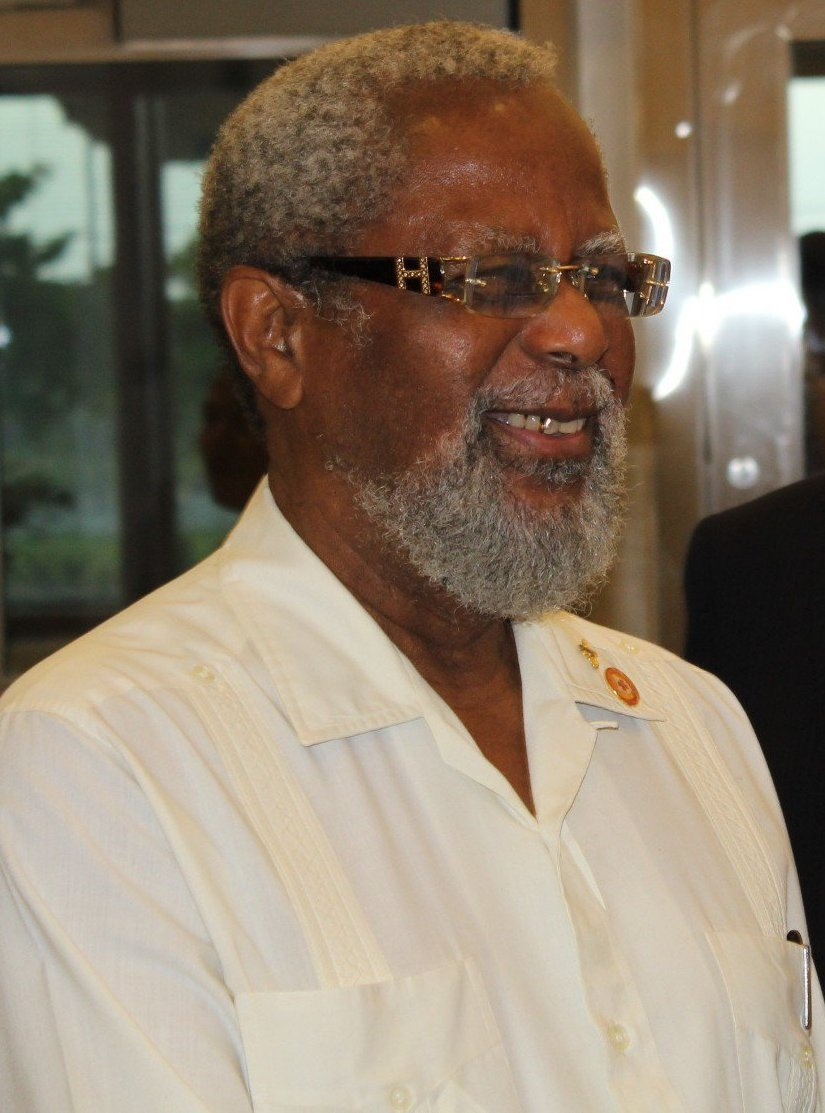
- Young in 2011

2nd Governor-General of Belize
- In office 17 November 1993 – 30 April 2021
- Monarch: Elizabeth II
- Prime Minister: Manuel Esquivel; Said Musa; Dean Barrow; Johnny Briceño
- Preceded by: Elmira Minita Gordon
- Succeeded by: Froyla Tzalam

Personal details
- Born: 20 November 1932 (age 93) Belize City, British Honduras (present-day Belize)
- Education: St. Michael's College (Belize); University of the West Indies; University of York

Sir Colville Norbert Young GCMG MBE (born 20 November 1932) is a Belizean politician who served as the second governor-general of Belize from 1993 to 2021. His tenure of 28 years is the longest of any governor-general in the history of the Commonwealth.

== Education ==
Sir Colville studied at Belize's St Michael's College (now part of Anglican Cathedral College (ACC) and not to be confused with the institution now known as Maud Williams High School), and earned a BA degree in English from the University of the West Indies, Mona Campus, Jamaica, prior to his doctorate in linguistics from the University of York in England. Young was a Fulbright Scholar and is a member of the Caribbean Teachers of English Association and the Society for Caribbean Linguistics.

== Career ==
In the 1960s, Young was a member of the opposition National Independence Party. He ran as the NIP candidate for the British Honduras Legislative Assembly in the Mesopotamia constituency in 1965 and 1969, but was defeated both times by C. L. B. Rogers, the People's United Party incumbent.

Along with future Prime Minister Manuel Esquivel, Young was one of the founding members of the Liberal Party, a short-lived pro-business political party which ultimately became a part of the United Democratic Party (UDP). Afterwards Young was interested in seeing Belize's development in academia and education, and after returning from England began trying to advance the nation in that regard. In the late 1980s Young became president of the University College of Belize, one of the five parent institutions of the University of Belize, and was one of its senior lecturers.

He became involved in music, composing all manner of musical pieces from operas to cantatas to others. He published a series of books of and about Belizean literature, including Literature and Education in Belize, Creole Proverbs of Belize, From One Caribbean Corner and Caribbean Corner Calling, the last two containing poems in English and Belize Creole. Of these books, Creole Proverbs is his most recognised. In 1993, just before becoming Governor General, he published a book of short stories called Pataki Full, earning acclaim from the local writing community. His stories have been featured in the Belizean Writers Series in "Snapshots of Belize", and a play Riding Haas in the drama anthology Ping Wing Juk Me, also in the Series.

== Governor-General of Belize (1993–2021) ==
Viceregal styles of Sir Colville Young (1993–2021)
- Reference style: His Excellency
- Spoken style: Your Excellency

Young became the Belizean governor-general shortly after the UDP under Esquivel regained power in the 1993 elections. Young was active in creating and maintaining relations with foreign dignitaries and countries. He was sworn into the Privy Council upon his assumption of office. He was also active within the larger community in Belize, specifically in education and teacher training.

Shortly after taking office, Young was made patron of the Scout Association of Belize. He was knighted in 1994.

In 2017, several fake and unauthorized Facebook profiles were created under the name "Colville Young". Citizens were warned not to interact with the profiles as all communication from the governor-general is shared by the Government of Belize Press Office.

Young retired as Governor-General on 30 April 2021. Froyla Tzalam succeeded him as Governor-General on 27 May 2021.

== Personal life and interests ==
Young is married to Lady (Norma) Young, née Trapp, and has three sons and a daughter. He has three siblings.

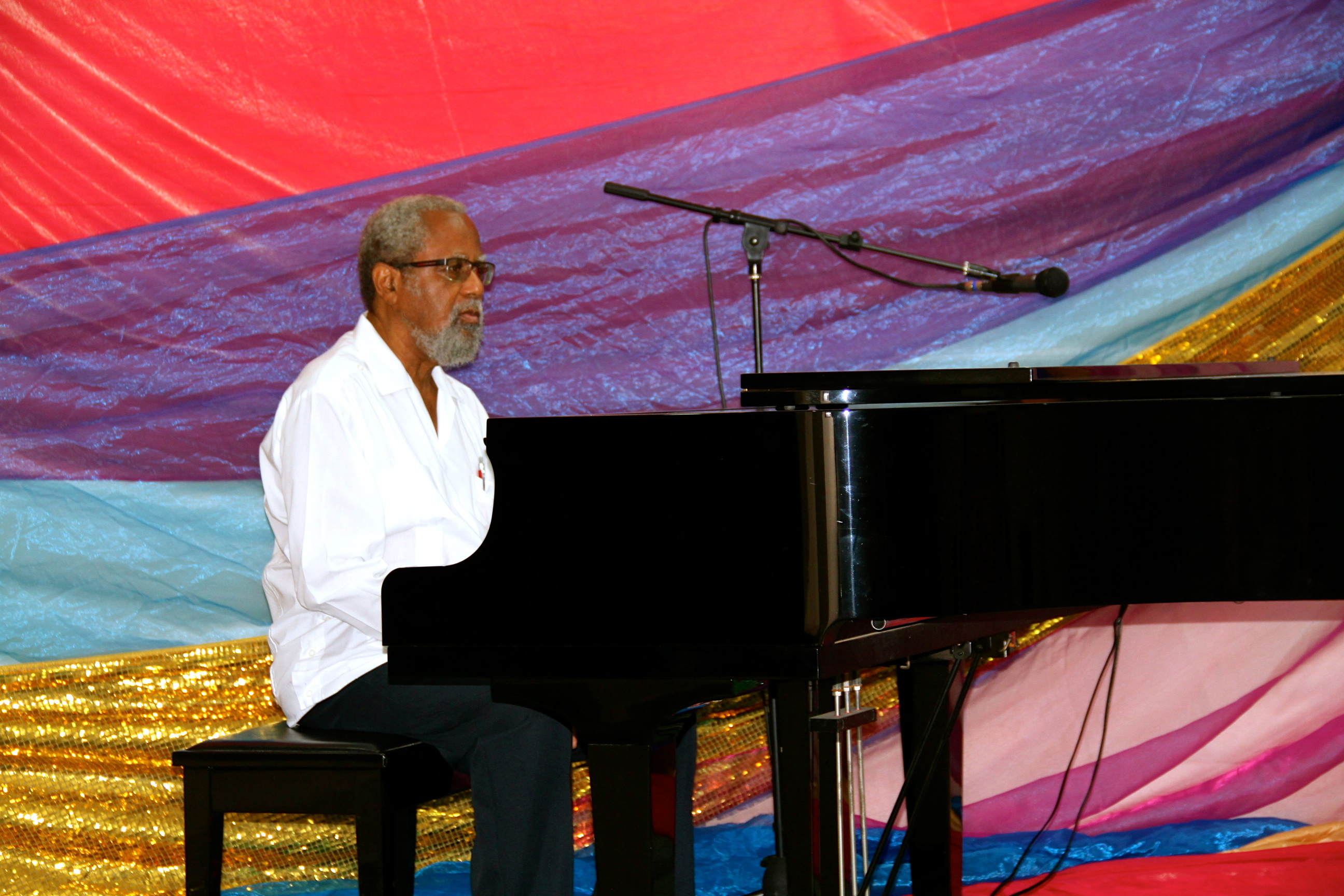
Sir Colville Young playing piano at BAY Back to School Fundraiser, 2014

Young has a stated interest in promoting the development of Belizean music. Young has actively contributed to efforts in Belizean schools to maintain music as an educational staple. Young's son, Colville Young Jr., is the director of the Belize National Youth Symphony. Currently Colville Young is working with founders of the Belize Virtuosi Orchestra, Joel Nagel and Peter Illavsky, to raise funds to build a chamber orchestra auditorium in Belize. Young established the Governor General's Music in the Schools Programme which works with partner abroad to expand music in schools and access to musical instruments.

== See also ==
- Caribbean literature

Government offices
Preceded by Elmira Minita Gordon	Governor General of Belize; 1993–2021	Succeeded by Froyla Tzalam
