= Leader of the Opposition (Belize) =

Belizean parliamentary position

Leader of His Majesty's Most Loyal Opposition
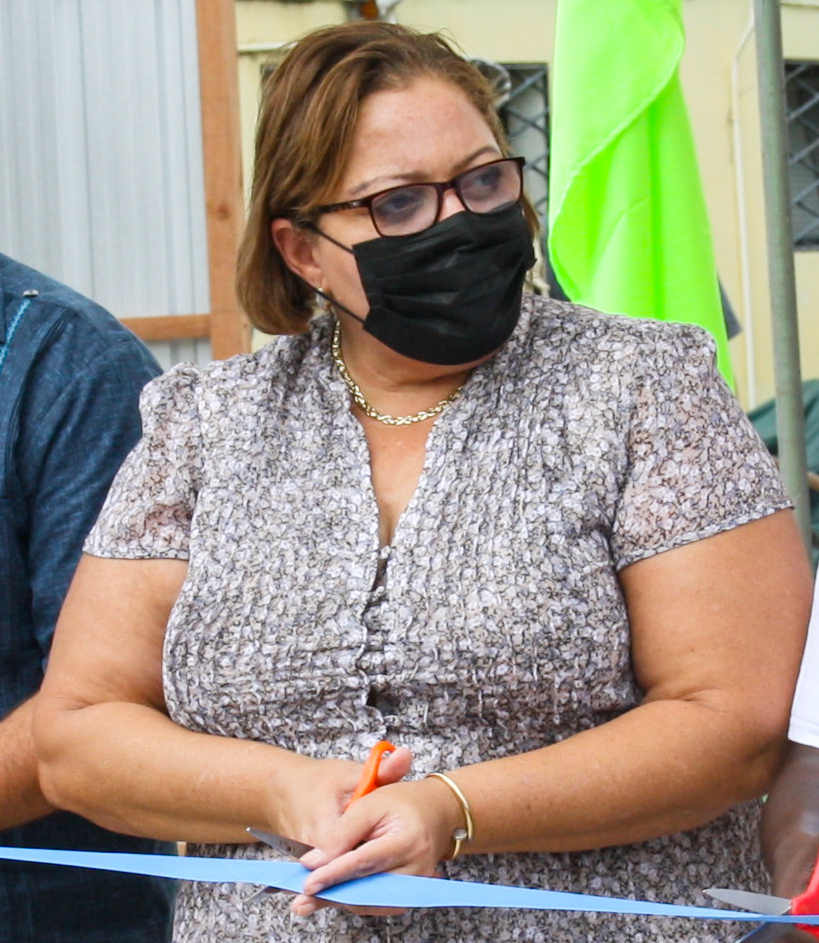
- Incumbent; Tracy Panton since March 14, 2025
- The Opposition; National Assembly of Belize
- Style: The Honourable
- Residence: Belize City, Belize
- Appointer: Froyla Tzalam
- Term length: While leader of the largest political party in the House of Representatives that is not in government
- Precursor: Moses Barrow
- Inaugural holder: Theodore Aranda
- Formation: September 21, 1981
- Deputy: Hugo Patt
- Website: https://www.udp.org.bz/

The Leader of the Opposition (officially the Leader of His Majesty's Most Loyal Opposition of Belize) is an elected official who, according to the Constitution, "commands the support of those elected officials that do not support the Government." The Leader of the Opposition is the leader of the largest political party in the House of Representatives that is not in government.

The leader of the opposition speaks on behalf of the Opposition Members of House of Representatives and also lead the Shadow Cabinet of Belize.

The current leader of the opposition is Tracy Panton, since 14 March 2025. However, she does not hold the position of leader of the United Democratic Party, which is currently held by Interim Leader Hugo Patt, who will serve until the next party national convention.

== Leaders of the Opposition of Belize since Independence (1981–present) ==
No.	Portrait	Name (Birth–Death)	Tenure			Political party
No.	Portrait	Name (Birth–Death)	Took office	Left office	Time in office	Political party
1		Theodore Aranda (1934–2022)	21 September 1981	November 1982	1 year, 1 month	UDP
2		Curl Thompson (born 1934)	January 1983	17 December 1984	1 year, 11 months	UDP
3		Florencio Marin (born 1942)	17 December 1984	7 September 1989	4 years, 264 days	PUP
4		Manuel Esquivel (1940–2022)	7 September 1989	3 July 1993	3 years, 299 days	UDP
5		George Cadle Price (1919–2011)	3 July 1993	10 November 1996	3 years, 130 days	PUP
6		Said Musa (born 1944)	10 November 1996	28 August 1998	1 year, 291 days	PUP
7		Dean Barrow (born 1951)	28 August 1998	8 February 2008	9 years, 164 days	UDP
(6)		Said Musa (born 1944)	8 February 2008	30 March 2008	51 days	PUP
8		Johnny Briceño (born 1960)	30 March 2008	18 October 2011	3 years, 202 days	PUP
9		Francis Fonseca	3 November 2011	6 November 2015	4 years, 3 days	PUP
(8)		Johnny Briceño (born 1960)	8 February 2016	11 November 2020	4 years, 277 days	PUP
10		Patrick Faber (born 1978)	13 November 2020	24 June 2021	223 days	UDP
11		Moses Barrow (born 1978)	24 June 2021	16 September 2021	84 days	UDP
(10)		Patrick Faber (born 1978)	16 September 2021	1 February 2022	138 days	UDP
(11)		Moses Barrow (born 1978)	1 February 2022	14 March 2025	3 years, 41 days	UDP
12		Tracy Panton	14 March 2025	Incumbent	1 year, 209 days	UDP

=== Notes ===
- Theodore Aranda was removed as UDP leader in Dangriga Town on 21 November 1982 while still holding the office of Leader of the Opposition, which he had held since the UDP lost general elections exactly three years earlier on 21 November 1979. Aranda resigned from the UDP shortly thereafter. Curl Thompson was subsequently elevated to deputy party leader and Leader of the Opposition. Meanwhile, Manuel Esquivel defeated Phillip Goldson in elections for party leader in January 1983. Since Esquivel was a member of the Belize Senate at the time, Thompson remained as Leader of the Opposition in the House until the December 1984 election.
- Florencio Marin became Leader of the Opposition after PUP leader George Cadle Price lost his seat in the 1984 election, which the PUP lost by 21 seats to seven. Price retained his position as PUP leader.
- Price resigned as leader of the PUP on 17 August 1996, during his only term as Leader of the Opposition. He was succeeded as party leader and Leader of the Opposition by Said Musa on 10 November 1996.
- Dean Barrow was named Leader of the Opposition after Esquivel lost his seat in the 27 August 1998 election, in which the UDP retained just three seats, of which Barrow's was one. On 30 August, Esquivel retired to make way for Barrow as the new party leader. Barrow retained the office after the UDP lost elections again on 5 March 2003.
- Musa was appointed Leader of the Opposition on 11 February 2008. However effective 30 March 2008, he stepped down as PUP leader and Leader of the Opposition. He was succeeded by Johnny Briceño of Orange Walk.
- Briceño resigned as PUP leader on 7 October 2011 and as Leader of the Opposition on 18 October 2011, citing health issues. The PUP elected Francis Fonseca as his successor on 3 November 2011.
- Barrow ousted Faber as leader in Parliament after obtaining support from the majority of his colleagues.

== See also ==
- Politics of Belize
- Governor-General of Belize
- List of heads of state of Belize
- List of prime ministers of Belize
