= Nemencio Acosta =

Belizean politician

- Born: Belize
- Occupation: Politician

Nemencio Acosta is a Belizean politician from the United Democratic Party (UDP).

== Background ==
In the parliamentary elections in Belize in 2003, he was a candidate for the UDP in the constituency of Corozal North and lost the election with 48.84% of the vote to Valdemar Isidro Castillo of the PUP. In the 2008 elections, he was re-elected in the same constituency as Kannedaat and won the election twice with 49.07% against Castillo. February 2008 to 2012, he was appointed by the House of Representatives of Belize. In October 2011, he was appointed Minister of State at the Ministry for Fisheries, a position he held until 14 October 2011.

In 2009 he became chairman of the Sugar Industry Control Board.
