= Christian Democratic Party (Belize) =

Political party in Belize

The Democratic and Agricultural Labour Party (DALP), more commonly referred to as the Christian Democratic Party (CDP), was a short-lived political party in Belize. It promoted Christian Democratic ideals.

== History ==
Shortly after the formation of the National Independence Party in 1958, Member of the Belize House of Representatives Enrique Depaz claimed at a meeting held on 19 August that there was no opposition to the ruling People's United Party (PUP), who had just won elections in March 1957. He proposed that a third party was necessary to provide real representation to Belizeans. His proposal was accepted and the DALP was formed under leader Nicholas Pollard. The party aimed to achieve self-government and promote social, economic and political development and was against entering groupings such as the Federation of the West Indies or any proposed affiliation with Guatemala and/or the rest of Central America.

By October 1960, the party felt it was time to reorganise. Pollard was demoted to Deputy Leader and replaced by MP Denbigh Jeffery. Joining them were Chairman Lionel Francis (previously of the NP), Secretary Mervyn Hulse and assistant Ernest Cain, Treasurer Clare Gill and National Organizer Robert Taylor. The party contested its first elections in 1961, but none of the eleven candidates it fielded won a seat. As a result the party fizzled and most of its members switched over to the National Independence Party.

The party was briefly revived prior to the 1984 elections by Theodore Aranda to promote his new party based in Dangriga. However, it received only 708 votes (1.5%) and failed to win a seat.
