= Elmira Minita Gordon =

Governor-General of Belize from 1981 to 1993

Dame Elmira Minita Gordon GCMG GCVO JP

1st Governor-General of Belize
- In office 21 September 1981 – 17 November 1993
- Monarch: Elizabeth II
- Prime Minister: George Cadle Price; Manuel Esquivel
- Preceded by: Position established James Hennessy (as Governor)
- Succeeded by: Colville Young

Personal details
- Born: 30 December 1930 Belize City, British Honduras
- Died: 1 January 2021 (aged 90) Inglewood, California, U.S.
- Education: University of Nottingham; University of Birmingham; University of Calgary; University of Toronto

Dame Elmira Minita Gordon GCMG GCVO JP (30 December 1930 – 1 January 2021) was a Belizean educator, psychologist and politician; she served as the first governor general of Belize from its independence in 1981 until 1993. She was the first Belizean to receive a doctorate in psychology. She is one of the few "double dames", having received damehoods in two separate orders: the Order of St Michael and St George and the Royal Victorian Order.

She was the first woman to serve as governor-general in the history of the Commonwealth.

== Biography ==
Elmira Minita Gordon was born 30 December 1930 in Belize City, British Honduras. Her parents, Frederick Gordon and May Dakers, had immigrated from Jamaica to Lucky Strike, Belize, in the 1920s. Gordon had five siblings: Lincoln Coyi, Dorinda Henderson, Kelorah Franklin, Rolston Coyi, and Robert Reyes. She grew up in Belize City, attending St. John's Girls' School and St. Mary's Primary. Gordon was a member of the Girl Guides from 1946. Years later, in 1970 Gordon became the District Commissioner of the Girl Guides for the Belize district.

Gordon continued her education at St. George's Teachers' College. She also took a correspondence course from the College of Preceptors, Oxford, England.

After graduation, she began teaching at an Anglican school. She also served as a missionary throughout Belize between 1946 and 1958. From 1959 to 1969, she was a lecturer at the Belize Teachers' Training College. From 1969 to 1981, she served as a Government Education Officer.

Gordon graduated from the University of Calgary in Alberta, Canada, with a B.Ed. (1967) and an M.Ed. (1969) specialising in educational psychology. She completed postgraduate studies at the University of Nottingham and University of Birmingham in England. Between 1977 and 1980, when Gordon was in Canada, she served on the Educational Psychology Programme Planning Committee and was a member of the Toronto Leather Craft Club. She graduated with a PhD in applied psychology from the University of Toronto in 1980, becoming the first trained Belizean psychologist.

She returned to Belize after graduating. In 1981 Gordon was appointed as Governor General of Belize. She succeeded James P. I. Hennessy, the last Governor of Belize. She became the first Governor-General of Belize upon Belize gaining independence that year.

Gordon became a justice of the peace in 1974 and a senior Justice of the Peace in 1987. Gordon received a lifetime membership of the British Red Cross in 1975, and in the Belizean Red Cross in 1981. In addition to her public works, Gordon was a master leather crafts artisan, having won numerous prizes for her works.

Gordon stepped down as Governor-General in 1993, and was succeeded by Sir Colville Young. In later years, poor health prompted her to move to the United States in 2016 to live with her sister, Kelorah Franklin. She died on 1 January 2021, in Inglewood, Los Angeles County, California, two days after her 90th birthday.

== Honours ==
- Honorary LL.D., University of Victoria (1984)
- Dame Grand Cross of the Order of St Michael and St George (1984)
- Dame Grand Cross of the Royal Victorian Order (1985)

== Sources ==
- Lentz, Harris M. (2014). Heads of States and Governments Since 1945. Routledge. ISBN 978-1-134-26490-2.
- Sleeman, Elizabeth (2001). The International Who's Who of Women 2002. Psychology Press. ISBN 978-1-85743-122-3.

Political offices
New office	Governor-General of Belize; 1981–1993	Succeeded by Colville Young
