= 2015 Belizean general election =

- 4 November 2015

All 31 seats in the House of Representatives 16 seats needed for a majority
- Registered: 196,587
- Turnout: 72.69% (▼0.49pp)
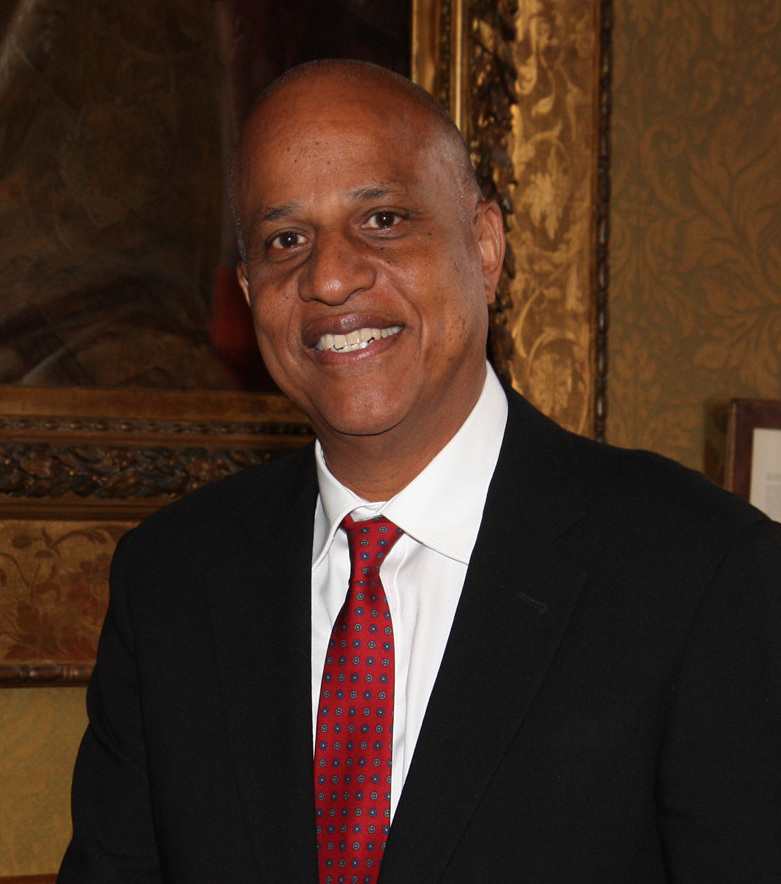

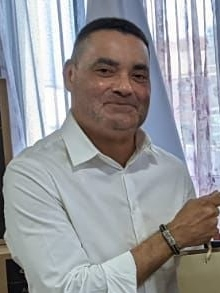
	First party	Second party
Leader	Dean Barrow	Francis Fonseca
Party	UDP	PUP
Leader since	30 August 1998	3 November 2011
Leader's seat	Queen's Square	Freetown
Last election	50.43%, 17 seats	47.99%, 14 seats
Seats won	19	12
Seat change	▲2	▼2
Popular vote	71,452	67,566
Percentage	50.52%	47.77%
Swing	▲0.09 pp	▼0.22 pp
- Popular vote by constituency
Prime Minister before election
Dean Barrow
UDP
Subsequent Prime Minister
Dean Barrow
UDP

General elections were held in Belize on 4 November 2015 to elect members of the House of Representatives. On 28 September 2015 Prime Minister Dean Barrow announced that he had advised the Governor-General to dissolve the National Assembly and to fix Wednesday 4 November 2015 as the date for the next general elections.

Barrow's United Democratic Party increased its majority from 17 seats to 19 seats. While the People's United Party won 12 seats.

== Date ==
The prior general election was held on 7 March 2012, and the previous National Assembly opened on 21 March 2012. According to Section 84 of the Constitution of Belize, the National Assembly must be dissolved "five years from the date when the two Houses of the former National Assembly first met" unless dissolved sooner by the Governor-General of Belize upon the advice of the prime minister. A general election must be called within three months of a dissolution, which meant the latest possible date for the next Belizean general election was 21 June 2017.

In March 2015 UDP leader and Prime Minister Dean Barrow ruled out the possibility of a snap election later in 2015 despite his party's recent interim electoral successes.

In early September 2015 Barrow indicated the election would be called in early 2016, however no firm date had been set at the time.

The poll is the second consecutive snap election in Belize held closer to four years rather than five. Both Barrow and the opposition People's United Party support lowering the maximum term of the National Assembly to four years.

Candidates were formally nominated on 16 October 2015.

== Background ==
The ruling UDP led by Barrow attempted to win a third consecutive election for the first time in its history. The UDP won the 2012 election with a considerably smaller majority than it enjoyed after the 2008 election. However, the PUP had not won a major election since 2003.

Going into the 2015 election, the UDP held eight of the 10 constituencies in Belize City, by far the country's largest city. Continued dominance in Belize City was seen as key to future UDP success. Meanwhile, the opposition People's United Party sought to maintain its edge in the rural districts. Gains in the Toledo, Stann Creek and Orange Walk Districts more than made up for the PUP's net loss in Belize City in 2012.

Based on a previously scheduled purge of electoral lists by the Belize Elections and Boundaries Commission, Opposition Leader Francis Fonseca has requested international observation of the election from the Caribbean Community, the Organization of American States or the Commonwealth of Nations.

=== Constituency boundaries ===
Constituency boundaries were unchanged from 2012 as Belize does not have a regular reapportionment schedule. Belizean electoral divisions were last redrawn in 2005. In October 2015 the opposition Vision Inspired by the People party filed suit seeking to nullify the election results based on this lack of a recent reapportionment.

=== Party leadership ===
Barrow, who has led the UDP since 1998, led the party for a fourth consecutive election. He stated this election would be his last as party leader.

The PUP was led by Leader of the Opposition Francis Fonseca, despite Fonseca facing a leadership challenge from several PUP area representatives earlier in 2015. The election was Fonseca's second as party leader.

=== Minor parties ===
Third parties traditionally perform poorly in Belize, with no third party running independently finishing with more than one percent of the vote nationwide since 1984. Belize's active minor parties at the time of the 2012 election, Vision Inspired by the People and the People's National Party, ran a total of nine candidates between them in 2012 but were not competitive in any seat.

In September 2015, shortly after the election was called, the PNP merged with members of the VIP and other opposition groups to form the Belize Progressive Party (BPP). The BPP ran in 25 out of 31 constituencies. Another minor party, the Belize Green Independent Party, ran a single candidate in Toledo East, but garnered only 5 votes.

=== Interim elections ===
==== January 2015 Cayo North by-election ====
The Cayo North constituency held a by-election on 5 January 2015 to elect a successor to PUP Area Rep. Joseph Mahmud, who unexpectedly resigned in November 2014. Mahmud had previously indicated he was standing down.

The by-election was only the third in Belize since independence, and the first since a by-election in Cayo South in October 2003. Candidate nominations closed on 15 December 2014 with PUP nominee Richard Harrison and UDP nominee Omar Figueroa qualifying. No third-party candidates appeared on the ballot. Figueroa won the by-election by a nearly 2-to-1 margin, increasing the UDP's overall majority in the Belize House.

==== March 2015 municipal elections ====
Municipal elections held on 4 March 2015 resulted in a decisive UDP victory, with the governing party easily re-electing Belize City Mayor Darrell Bradley and retaining control of the Belize City Council. The UDP also defeated PUP-controlled local governments in Dangriga and Punta Gorda. The PUP prevailed in only one municipality nationwide, Orange Walk Town.

==== July 2015 Dangriga by-election ====
On 8 June 2015 PUP Area Rep. Ivan Ramos resigned after controversially failing to retain his standard bearer status in Dangriga. A by-election was held on 8 July. Nominations were formally made on 22 June. Former Dangriga Mayor Frank "Papa" Mena was the UDP nominee, while retired educator Anthony Sabal stood as the PUP candidate after initial reports the PUP might not contest the by-election at all. Llewellyn Lucas from the Belize Green Independent Party was also nominated, becoming that party's first official candidate in any election since it was founded in 2012. A fourth candidate endorsed by both of Belize's other active minor parties, the PNP and VIP, was disqualified due to holding dual citizenship. Belizean candidates for public office may not hold citizenship in any other country.

The by-election was won by Mena with 57.89 percent of the vote, giving the UDP its third consecutive by-election win dating to 2003.

== Area Representatives standing down ==
=== UDP ===
1. Santino Castillo (Caribbean Shores), announced 15 April 2015.
2. Herman R. Longsworth (Albert), announced 25 March 2015.
3. Elvin Penner (Cayo North East), deselected 8 June 2014.

=== PUP ===
1. Marco Tulio Mendez (Orange Walk East), announced 11 November 2014.

== Results ==
Party	Votes	%	Seats	+/–
United Democratic Party	71,452	50.52	19	+2
People's United Party	67,566	47.77	12	–2
Belize Progressive Party	2,336	1.65	0	New
Belize Green Independent Party	5	0.00	0	New
Independents	72	0.05	0	0
Total	141,431	100.00	31	0
Valid votes	141,431	98.97		
Invalid/blank votes	1,469	1.03		
Total votes	142,900	100.00		
Registered voters/turnout	196,587	72.69		
Source: Elections and Boundaries Department
