= List of prime ministers of Belize =

Prime Minister of Belize
- Seal of prime minister of Belize

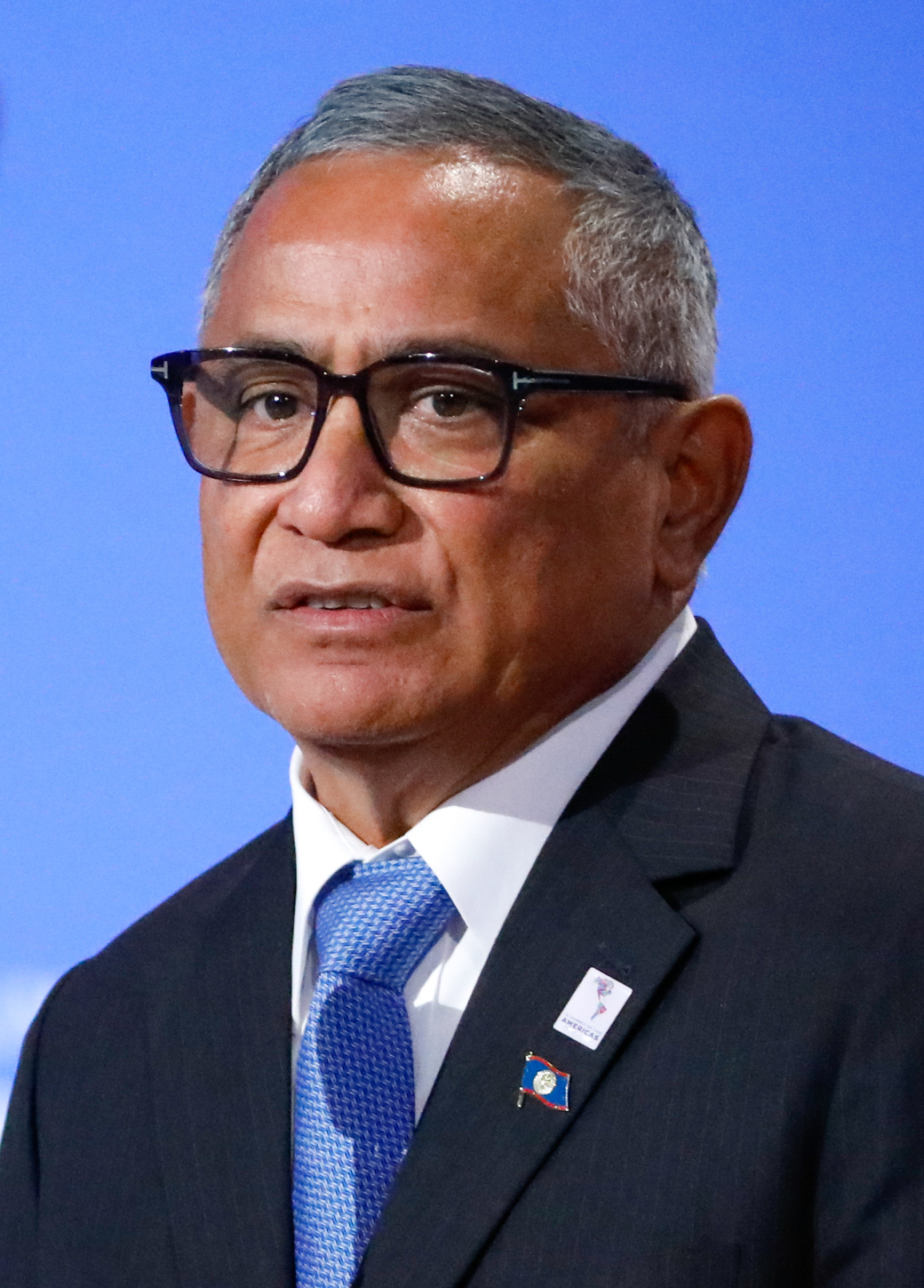
- Incumbent; Johnny Briceño since 12 November 2020
- Government; Cabinet
- Style: The Right Honourable
- Type: Head of government
- Member of: Cabinet
- Residence: Left Wing, Sir Edney Cain Building, Belmopan
- Seat: Belmopan
- Appointer: Governor-General
- Term length: 5 years, 3-term limit (aggregate)
- Precursor: Premier of Belize
- Inaugural holder: George Cadle Price
- Formation: 12 September 1981
- Deputy: Cordel Hyde
- Salary: BZ$91,800 annually

This article lists the prime ministers and deputy prime ministers of Belize, from the establishment of the position of First Minister of British Honduras in 1961 to the present day.

== Office of the Prime Minister of Belize ==
The office of prime minister is established by section 37 of the Constitution of Belize, which provides that the governor-general of Belize "shall appoint a member of the House of Representatives who is the leader of the political party which commands the support of the majority of the members of that House; and if no political party has an overall majority, he shall appoint a member of that House who appears to him likely to command the support of the majority of the members of that House" The prime minister's principal office is the Sir Edney Cain Building, Belmopan.

== List of officeholders ==
Political parties

People's United Party (PUP)
United Democratic Party (UDP)

=== First Minister of British Honduras (1961–1964) ===
No.	Portrait	Name (Birth–Death)	Election	Term of office			Political party
No.	Portrait	Name (Birth–Death)	Election	Took office	Left office	Time in office	Political party
1		George Cadle Price (1919–2011)	1961	7 April 1961	1 January 1964	2 years, 269 days	PUP

=== Premier of British Honduras (1964–1973) ===
No.	Portrait	Name (Birth–Death)	Election	Term of office			Political party
No.	Portrait	Name (Birth–Death)	Election	Took office	Left office	Time in office	Political party
1		George Cadle Price (1919–2011)	1965; 1969	1 January 1964	1 June 1973	9 years, 151 days	PUP

=== Premier of Belize (1973–1981) ===
No.	Portrait	Name (Birth–Death)	Election	Term of office			Political party
No.	Portrait	Name (Birth–Death)	Election	Took office	Left office	Time in office	Political party
1		George Cadle Price (1919–2011)	1974; 1979	1 June 1973	12 September 1981	8 years, 103 days	PUP

=== Prime ministers of Belize (1981–present) ===
No.	Portrait	Name (Birth–Death)	Election	Term of office			Political party
No.	Portrait	Name (Birth–Death)	Election	Took office	Left office	Time in office	Political party
1		George Cadle Price (1919–2011)	—	12 September 1981	17 December 1984	3 years, 96 days	PUP
2		Manuel Esquivel (1940–2022)	1984	17 December 1984	7 September 1989	4 years, 264 days	UDP
(1)		George Cadle Price (1919–2011)	1989	7 September 1989	13 July 1993	3 years, 309 days	PUP
(2)		Manuel Esquivel (1940–2022)	1993	13 July 1993	28 August 1998	5 years, 46 days	UDP
3		Said Musa (born 1944)	1998; 2003	28 August 1998	8 February 2008	9 years, 164 days	PUP
4		Dean Barrow (born 1951)	2008; 2012; 2015	8 February 2008	12 November 2020	12 years, 278 days	UDP
5		Johnny Briceño (born 1960)	2020; 2025	12 November 2020	Incumbent	5 years, 331 days	PUP

== Timeline ==
This is a graphical lifespan timeline of the prime ministers of Belize. They are listed in order of first assuming office.

The following chart lists prime ministers by lifespan (living prime ministers on the green line), with the years outside of their tenure in beige.

== Deputy Prime Minister of Belize ==
Deputy Prime Minister of Belize
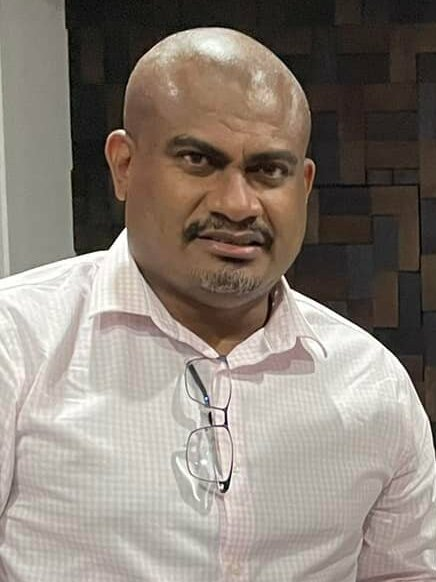
- Incumbent; Cordel Hyde since November 13, 2020
- Government of Belize; Cabinet of Belize
- Style: The Honourable
- Member of: Cabinet
- Residence: Belize City, Belize
- Appointer: Froyla Tzalam
- Term length: At the pleasure of the prime minister
- Inaugural holder: Florencio Marin
- Formation: 12 September 1981
- Website: House of Representatives

The deputy prime minister of Belize is an elected official who, according to the Constitution, "serves at the pleasure of the Prime Minister of Belize." The deputy prime minister is often the deputy leader of the largest political party in the House of Representatives of Belize that is in government.

=== List of officeholders ===
No.	Portrait	Name	Term of office			Political party
No.	Portrait	Name	Took office	Left office	Time in office	Political party
1		Florencio Marin (1st time)	12 September 1981	14 December 1984	3 years, 93 days	PUP
2		Curl Thompson	15 December 1984	4 September 1989	4 years, 263 days	UDP
(1)		Florencio Marin (2nd time)	5 September 1989	30 June 1993	3 years, 298 days	PUP
3		Dean Barrow	1 July 1993	27 August 1998	5 years, 57 days	UDP
4		Johnny Briceño	28 August 1998	4 June 2007	8 years, 280 days	PUP
5		Juan Vildo Marin	5 June 2007	7 February 2008	247 days	PUP
6		Gaspar Vega	8 February 2008	5 May 2016	8 years, 87 days	UDP
7		Patrick Faber	6 May 2016	10 February 2020	3 years, 280 days	UDP
8		Hugo Patt	11 February 2020	11 November 2020	274 days	UDP
9		Cordel Hyde	12 November 2020	Incumbent	5 years, 331 days	PUP

== See also ==
- List of governors of British Honduras
- Governor-General of Belize
- List of heads of state of Belize
- List of prime ministers of Elizabeth II
- List of prime ministers of Charles III
- List of Commonwealth heads of government
- List of Privy Counsellors (1952–2022)
- List of Privy Counsellors (2022–present)
