= List of political parties in Belize =

This article lists political parties in the country of Belize.

Belize has a two-party system, which means that there are two dominant political parties. It is difficult to achieve electoral success under the banner of any other party.

== Political culture ==
In 1950, after the general worker union had been formed, the people's committee constituted itself as the PUP (People's United Party) and taken the majority seating in the elected Belize city council. When Belize became fully independent and joined in the Commonwealth on September 21, 1981, the two parties UDP (United Democratic Party) and PUP rose in the political scene. This made an effect two-party system. The UDP believes in pro-business and the PUP believes in pro-labour but both are closely centred in the spectrum. The PUP foster the idea of political independence but their opposition UDP believe in the national interest of equitable distribution of public services from the government.

The party system is dominated by the centre-left People's United Party and the centre-right United Democratic Party. There have been other small parties that have participated at all levels of governmental elections in the past. Although none of these small political parties have ever won any significant number of seats and/or offices, their challenge has been growing over the years.

== National parties ==
=== Political parties with elected representation at a national or international level ===
Party	Position	Ideology	Leader	Representation	
Party	Position	Ideology	Leader	House	Senate
People's United Party (PUP)	Centre to centre-left	Christian democracy; Social democracy; Nationalism	Johnny Briceño	26 / 31	6 / 13
United Democratic Party (UDP)	Centre-right	Conservatism	Tracy Panton	5 / 31	3 / 13

==== Other minor parties ====
Party	Position	Ideology	Leader
Belize People's Front (BPF)	Centre-left	Social democracy; Progressivism	Nancy Marin
Belize Progressive Party (BPP)	Centre-left to left-wing	Social democracy; Reformism; Republicanism	Patrick Rogers
Vision Inspired by the People (VIP)	[?]	[?]	Hubert Enriquez

=== Defunct parties ===
- Democratic and Agricultural Labour Party (DALP)
- Honduran Independence Party (HIP)
- National Alliance for Belizean Rights (NABR)
- National Independence Party (NIP)
- National Party (NP)
- National Reform Party (NRP)
- People's Action Committee (PAC)
- People's Democratic Party (PDP)
- People's National Party (PNP)
- United Black Association for Development (UBAD; now known as the UBAD Educational Foundation, UEF)
- We the People Reform Movement (WTP)

== Provincial parties ==
These parties were/are active only in a certain area.

=== Current ===
- San Pedro United Movement (SPUM)

=== Defunct ===
- Christian Democratic Party (CDP) (was only active in Dangriga)
- Corozal United Front (CUF)
- National Reality Truth Creation Party (NRTCP) (was only active in Belize City)
- Toledo Progressive Party (TPP) (was only active in Punta Gorda)

== See also ==
- Politics of Belize
- List of political parties by country
