= Belmopan (Belize House constituency) =

- Constituency for the Belize House of Representatives
- District: Cayo
- Electorate: 7,780 (2012)
- Major settlements: Belmopan

Current constituency
- Created: 2008
- Party: People's United Party
- Area Representative: Oscar Mira

Belmopan is an electoral constituency in the Cayo District represented in the House of Representatives of the National Assembly of Belize since 2020 by Oscar Mira of the People's United Party (PUP).

== Profile ==
Along with Cayo North East, the Belmopan constituency was created for the 2008 general election. It encompasses the city of Belmopan – the Belizean national capital – and the immediate surrounding area. It is entirely surrounded by the Cayo South constituency from which it was comprised.

== Area representatives ==
Election	Area representative	Party
2008	John Saldivar	UDP
2012	John Saldivar	UDP
2015	John Saldivar	UDP
2020	Oscar Mira	PUP
2025	Oscar Mira	PUP

== Elections ==
Election	Political result	Candidate	Party	Votes	%	±%
2025 general election Electorate: 10,381; Turnout: 6,190 (59.63%) −19.65	PUP hold Majority: 2,220 (35.87%) +4.26	Oscar Mira	PUP	4,009	64.77	+3.95
2025 general election Electorate: 10,381; Turnout: 6,190 (59.63%) −19.65	PUP hold Majority: 2,220 (35.87%) +4.26	John Saldivar	UDP	1,789	28.90	-0.31
2025 general election Electorate: 10,381; Turnout: 6,190 (59.63%) −19.65	PUP hold Majority: 2,220 (35.87%) +4.26	Raiston Edward Frazer	UDP	215	3.47	-25.74
2020 general election Electorate: 8,758; Turnout: 6,943 (79.28%) +8.48	PUP gain from UDP; Majority: 2,168 (31.61%) +20.05	Oscar Mira	PUP	4,172	60.82	+6.90
2020 general election Electorate: 8,758; Turnout: 6,943 (79.28%) +8.48	PUP gain from UDP; Majority: 2,168 (31.61%) +20.05	John Saldivar	UDP	2,004	29.21	-13.15
2020 general election Electorate: 8,758; Turnout: 6,943 (79.28%) +8.48	PUP gain from UDP; Majority: 2,168 (31.61%) +20.05	Anna Banner-Guy	Independent Politician	684	9.97	-
2015 general election Electorate: 9,523; Turnout: 6,551 (70.80%) −1.22	UDP hold Majority: 757 (11.56%) +7.37	John Saldivar	UDP	3,532	53.92	+4.39
2015 general election Electorate: 9,523; Turnout: 6,551 (70.80%) −1.22	UDP hold Majority: 757 (11.56%) +7.37	Patrick Jason Andrews	PUP	2,775	42.36	-3.28
2015 general election Electorate: 9,523; Turnout: 6,551 (70.80%) −1.22	UDP hold Majority: 757 (11.56%) +7.37	Charles Leslie Jr.	BPP	177	2.70	-
2012 general election Electorate: 7,780; Turnout: 5,603 (72.02%) −3.23	UDP hold Majority: 218 (3.89%) −16.42	John Saldivar	UDP	2,775	49.53	−6.15
2012 general election Electorate: 7,780; Turnout: 5,603 (72.02%) −3.23	UDP hold Majority: 218 (3.89%) −16.42	Amin Hegar	PUP	2,557	45.64	+10.27
2012 general election Electorate: 7,780; Turnout: 5,603 (72.02%) −3.23	UDP hold Majority: 218 (3.89%) −16.42	Richard Smith	PNP	230	4.10	-
2008 general election Electorate: 6,060; Turnout: 4,560 (75.25%) n/a	UDP win Majority: 926 (20.31%) n/a	John Saldivar	UDP	2,539	55.68	-
2008 general election Electorate: 6,060; Turnout: 4,560 (75.25%) n/a	UDP win Majority: 926 (20.31%) n/a	Rolando Zetina	PUP	1,613	35.37	-
2008 general election Electorate: 6,060; Turnout: 4,560 (75.25%) n/a	UDP win Majority: 926 (20.31%) n/a	Paul Morgan	VIP	359	7.87	-
