= 2006 Belizean municipal elections =

A series of local elections were held on March 1, 2006, to fill vacancies for town councils in Corozal, Orange Walk, San Pedro, San Ignacio, Benque Viejo, Dangriga, Punta Gorda, Belize City and Belmopan. All the councils except Belize City elected one mayor and six councilors; Belize City elected one mayor and ten councilors.

Sixty-seven seats were available, contested by 153 persons representing four political parties. There were four independent candidates, not counting the entrants from the independent political parties VIP and WTP. The United Democratic Party (UDP) won sixty-four seats, the People's United Party (PUP) three, and all other parties and independents none.

This was the second straight combined municipal election, following the one conducted in 2003. Previous to this date, elections were within a year to eighteen months of each other. Future elections will also likely be held together, starting with the 2009 election.

== Background ==
Belizeans protested for most of 2005 over the conditions of the country and the seeming ignorance of the ruling People's United Party toward these conditions. Toward the end of 2005, the PUP and the Opposition UDP turned their attention to preparing for the municipal elections in 2006.

== UDP preparations ==
The UDP held their convention to select candidates in Belize City on October 23, 2005, with winner Zenaida Moya doubling up her three male competitors, Bernard Watler, Rudolph "Sir Andie" Anderson, and Ernesto Torres in the mayoral race, and a field of 22 councilor candidates being narrowed to ten, those ten being: Laura Esquivel, Hyacinth Latchman, Leila Peyrefitte, Anthony Michael, Phillip Willoughby, Dean Samuels, Mark King, Calvert Quilter, Gilroy Middleton, and Wayne Usher. (Channel 5, October 24) Moya possessed a strong resume and support from various sectors of society which pushed her over the top. The UDP subsequently selected candidates for the other councils between mid-November 2005 and February 2006. One convention of note happened in Benque Viejo, where sitting Mayor Said Badi Guerra was unseated in conventions in December in favour of former Mayor Marconi Sosa. (Channel 5, December 12) Another incident came on February 10, when Dangriga mayoral nominee Frank Mena was injured in a freak accident and confined to his hospital bed through election day. Mena was nominated on and won election from his hospital bed for the UDP.

The UDP released its manifesto for Belize City and the other municipalities on January 4, 2006. Its adopted slogan was "Life Haad Out Ya! Vote UDP 7/11 for Change Now!"

== PUP preparations ==
In Belize City, the slate of eleven was selected on November 12, 2005. Sitting councillor Marshall Nunez was elevated to Mayoral aspirant and joined by three other sitting councillors and seven new ones as follows: Marshall Nunez (Mayor), Eloisa Trujeque, Jacqueline Welch, Yasmin Shoman, Anthony Mahler, Keith Acosta, Sharrett Yearwood, Oscar Rosado, Albert Vaughan, Shanine Campbell, and Carolyn Trench-Sandiford. Two term mayor David Fonseca declined re-election. The PUP campaigned on the slogan "There for You", signifying their long association with Belize City government. Manifestos were released on February 6. Other council selections were announced prior to Nomination Day on February 14, 2006.

One humorous incident occurred featuring campaigners from the ruling party. News 5 reported on February 13 that a house on Sarstoon Street collapsed while the owner was visited by the PUP 11, their campaign team and even Prime Minister Said Musa. No one was hurt and the owner would get a new house on the site-as soon as the old one was knocked down.

== Independent/third party nominations ==
The following third parties nominated candidates:

- We the People Reform Movement (WTP) (Corozal only)
- Vision Inspired by the People (VIP) (Belmopan only)
- New Alliance for Belizean Rights (Belize City only; not to be confused with the National Alliance for Belizean Rights (NABR)

Independent candidates contesting the elections, from north to south, included:

- Ernesto Caliz (San Pedro)
- Fernando Cruz (San Ignacio; mayor)
- Luis Ayala (San Ignacio; mayor)
- Anthony Westby (Punta Gorda; mayor)

== Election supervision ==
The elections were supervised by Stuart Leslie in his capacity as Chief Elections Officer of the Elections and Boundaries Commission. Leslie met repeatedly with media houses and political parties to make plans for the conduct of the elections and assure that voting rights would not be violated. This was Leslie's first (and only) supervisory role in an election since he assumed the post from Myrtle Palacio midway through 2005.

== Media coverage of the elections ==
Belize's media houses always say that politics is often the only news in Belize. The expected election proved no different. Election related stories topped all local newscasts from the announcement of the UDP Belize City 11 in October until practically the last vote had been counted, and even after that.

Local news powerhouses Channel 5 and Channel 7 teamed up with, respectively, LOVE FM/RSV Media Center and KREM Radio/Television to provide coverage of the actual election day. Channel 5/LOVE FM used Channel 5's Regent Street studios while Channel 7/KREM operated from Albert Street.

Election stories appeared in nearly every weekly newspaper from October to March.

== The campaign ==
Campaigning was, as ever, cutthroat and ruthless. No holds were barred as the 153 candidates scrambled for the over 70,000 votes available to them.

The UDP sought to present the PUP as heartless, corrupt, greedy and incapable of responsibility. In the case of Belize City, which the UDP had not won for over twenty years, mayoral candidate Nunez was presented as symbolizing the problems of the City and the PUP's supposed incompetence, with opponent Moya portrayed as the solution. UDP commercials typically featured poor conditions, frustrated City residents and smug PUP officials, accompanied by songs of protest, most notably Tanya Stephens' "Turn the Other Cheek". The Jamaican artist made an appearance in Belize in February for a concert and was interviewed on WAVE Radio but did not expressly support the UDP.

The PUP, for their part, claimed Moya and her crew were political unknowns, not ready for the responsibilities of city management. Their commercials featured singers chanting "We noh wan Zenaida/Vote for Marshall", trumpeting Nunez's experience. Another set of commercials featured Belizean entertainers making pitches to voters to support the PUP, who would be "there for you". The UDP countered this by changing the slogan to "There for Who?" and proceeded to name who the PUP were supposedly there for: their own political operatives and supporters.

Commercials and advertisements by both parties frequently took up TV time in the evenings and could be recognised by the preceding and ending phrase: "The following/preceding is/was a paid political announcement." Nothing escaped scrutiny; even the Party Leaders were vilified.

Official organ of the PUP, The Belize Times, even printed a rumour that UDP Leader Dean Barrow had resigned-one day before elections. This rumour was promptly quashed by Barrow on local TV newscasts prior to the election. Barrow had suggested he might step down from his post a few weeks earlier if the election's outcome were not favorable.

Attention was paid to the unusually high number of women participating in the elections. This was interpreted as a sign that Belizean women were beginning to step forward and take a more active role in politics.

== The election ==
Belizeans voted on March 1, 2006, from 7:00 a.m. to 6:00 p.m. Voter turnout was low in the morning but picked up later. When the votes were counted the results were the following (Mayors first followed by councillors):

- Corozal: UDP, 7-0 (Mayor Hilberto Campos, Aaron Babb, Luis Brooks, Joselle Cruz, Abigail Gomez, Rosalie Williams, Nonita Ramirez; 65.9% voter turnout)
- Orange Walk: UDP, 7-0 (Mayor Ravell Gonzalez, Raul Alcoser, Phillip De La Fuente, Jamil Matar, Rosario Melendez, Enid Morales, Carlos Perera; 73.6% voter turnout)
- Belize City: UDP, 11-0 (Mayor Zenaida Moya, Laura Esquivel, Mark King, Hyacinth Latchman, Anthony Michael, Gilroy Middleton, Leila Peyrefitte, Calvert Quilter, Dean Samuels, Wayne Usher; 54.5% voter turnout)
- San Pedro: UDP, 7-0 (Mayor Elsa Paz, Juan Alamilla, Joseph Elijio, Nesto Gomez, Justiniano Guerrero, Severo Guerrero Sr., Pablo Ico; 70.6% voter turnout)
- Belmopan: UDP, 7-0 (Mayor Simeon Lopez, Tita Balona, Eugene Michael Brown Jr., Celso Carcamo, Pedro Carillo, Olga Myers, Victor Perdomo; 70.7% voter turnout)
- San Ignacio/Santa Elena: UDP, 7-0 (Mayor John August Jr, Eduardo Cano, Bernadette Fernandez, George Herrera, Iliana Moreno, Vanessa Neal, Earl Trapp Jr.; 62.2% voter turnout)
- Benque Viejo: UDP, 6-1 (Mayor Marconi Sosa, Mirna Escalante, Adrian Guerra Jr, Elmer Guerra, Salvador Iglesias, Nicholas Ruiz, Armando Chulin (PUP); 75.5% voter turnout)
- Dangriga: UDP, 7-0 (Mayor Frank Mena, Alden Chavez, Grace Fairweather, Russell Garcia, Aaron Gongora, Barbara Norales, Harry Sabal; 59.2% voter turnout)
- Punta Gorda: UDP, 5-2 (Mayor Carlos Galvez, Leonardo Chavarria (PUP), Wilfredo Galvez, Anthony Lambey, Floyd Lino, Rene Pennell, Leroy Supaul; 62.2% voter turnout)

The most surprising results came in Punta Gorda, where 5 UDP candidates were elected but not Mayoral nominee Charles Selgado; and in Benque Viejo, where the PUP's Armando Chulin sneaked on to the council by 17 votes. In the Amandala of Sunday, March 5, 2006, publisher Evan X Hyde claimed the Punta Gorda result showed the maturity of Belizean voters in selecting a bipartisan council.

A total of nineteen women were elected, easily the highest such total ever. At least one woman was elected in each municipality except for Punta Gorda, where no women were nominated.

The UDP controlled all municipal boards for the first time ever (they previously came close in 1994 by winning all the municipalities after losing Belize City in 1993) and regained Belize City for the first time since 1986. Zenaida Moya became Belize City's first female Mayor and one of two female mayors in Belizean municipalities (joining the reelected Elsa Paz in San Pedro). The Amandala termed the victory a "blowout" while The Reporter called it a "landslide".

== Aftermath ==
Crowds lined the streets in each municipality to welcome their new elected leaders. In Belize City, during the midst of the counting, Channel 7 cameraman Alfonso Noble and Assistant Commissioner of Police, Eastern Division, Crispin Jeffries got into a tangle when Noble and other media personnel would not leave the counting station immediately. As Noble was being forcibly removed, Jeffries was heard to threaten Noble with future harm if they ever met again. This incident eventually faded.

Media across the nation began speculating whether the vote was not an indication of dissatisfaction with the PUP administration; most seemed to think it was. Most political analysts credited the UDP with smart selection, timely deduction and ruthless campaigning, whereas the PUP did not seem to put their all into the campaign, perhaps wiped out from the protests the previous year.

Most of the new administrations found irregularities in accounts when they got into office; in Belize City, the council was set back BZ$9 million in debts and loans, and outgoing Mayor David Fonseca was fingered for having misappropriated monies controlled by the council, though he claimed it was used to assist the poor.

Author Stephen Okeke has recently published the book The Psychology of Belize Politics, which attempts to explain the mechanics behind the UDP's victory at the polls.
