= Yolanda Schakron =

Belizean political activist

Yolanda Schakron-Rodriguez
- Born: 25 September 1965 (age 60); Guatemala
- Known for: Activist and politician
- Political party: People's United Party
- Spouse: Luis E. Rodriguez
- Children: 2

Edmee Yolanda Schakron-Rodríguez (born 25 September 1965) is a Belizean activist and People's United Party candidate, best known as the aunt of murder victim Chris Galvez and a founder and president of Belizeans For Justice. Schakron was briefly the PUP standard bearer for the Lake Independence House constituency in 2012, but her candidacy was disallowed due to her dual citizenship at the time in Belize and the United States, after which she renounced U.S. citizenship. Schakron was the unsuccessful PUP nominee for Mayor of Belize City in 2015.

== Early life ==
Schakron was born in Guatemala to Belizean parents. She previously lived in the United States, where she became a citizen at age 15 along with her parents when they naturalised. Schakron was married to Alfred Schakron, a businessman from Lebanon, but the two divorced. After their separation, she continued to raise her two children alone.

== Anti-crime activism ==
=== Grieving aunt ===
Schakron first came to public attention following the 22 December 2009 execution-style murder of her 23-year-old nephew Chris Galvez on Faber's Road in Belize City. Galvez was the city's 92nd murder victim that year. A week after the murder, autopsy results revealed some findings that were inconsistent with the police reports on Galvez' death; Schakron and her brother Martin Galvez made public comments accusing the police of covering up for Chris Galvez' real killers. A suspect had been detained for questioning but released and then departed the country for the United States. Belize's Ministry of National Security (MNS) formed a commission of inquiry to look into Galvez' murder, headed by Deputy National Security Coordinator Oliver Del Cid, MNS administrative officer Jennifer Saldivar-Ramirez, and Assistant Superintendent of Police Marion Allen. The commission's report criticised the police for procedural irregularities in their investigation, but refuted accusations of a cover-up.

In the aftermath, Schakron became the "public face of the [Galvez] family's anguish". In media interviews in February, Schakron announced that she was founding a movement for the families of crime victims, in order to bring pressure to bear on the police to investigate their cases. She claimed that "everybody in Belize" knew who murdered her nephew and blamed the police for not acting. Her movement began crystallising in March with the establishment of a website entitled Peace and Justice for All, which she co-created with poet Erwin X. In early March, she stated that she had received threats on her life. Two weeks later, under the banner of the newly formed organisation Belizeans For Justice which she co-founded with families of other crime victims, Schakron participated in a protest march which attracted roughly 200 participants.

=== Rising profile ===
Schakron's anti-crime activism led her into danger and into politics. In July 2010, at a Belizeans For Justice press conference that had already been delayed due to threats of violence against her, she called for the resignation of Commissioner of Police Crispin Jeffries at a Belizeans for Justice press conference, after Jeffries allegedly told her he wanted nothing to do with the organisation. In January 2011, BFJ led a court challenge against Prime Minister Dean Barrow's refusal to expand the Senate of Belize to 13 members as required by a 2008 amendment to the Constitution of Belize. In response, Oscar Rosado accused BFJ of having been "hijacked" by its legal advisers, namely ex-Prime Minister Said Musa and attorney Anthony Sylvestre, both People's United Party (PUP) members. In April, Schakron's vehicle was set on fire; she stated that she had received a phone call with information that two police officers involved in the murder of her nephew and another murder were behind the arson.

In June, Schakron led a march of squatters in a Belizeans For Justice march which blocked Belcan Bridge. After hearing the news that she would be charged with assaulting a police officer for her actions during the March, she went to the Queen Street Police Station to turn herself in, as supporters including BFJ and Belize Bus Association members thronged the streets to show their solidarity. Also in June, BFJ open its headquarters office, and announced that it would offer preschool and primary school scholarships to children of murder victims. Schakron's family members also had various brushes with police. Late the following month, police fired on Schakron's vehicle at a highway checkpoint near the Vista Del Mar suburb; Schakron herself was not in the vehicle, which had been borrowed by her sister Lizette Armstrong. No one was injured during the incident. Her nephew Zane Galvez was also injured by a Gang Suppression Unit member later that month. Galvez was delivering goods to a wake being held for purported gang leader Charles Woodeye; he got caught up in a sweep conducted by police officers who had been trailing the funeral march, and one of them broke his arm with a baseball bat.

== As a political candidate ==
=== Entry into electoral politics ===
In an interview in June 2011, Schakron hinted that she was considering entering into politics. In July, she applied to represent the opposition PUP in the following year's municipal election as a mayoral candidate. However, in November the PUP announced they had selected Karen Bodden as their mayoral candidate.

In February 2012, it was announced that Schakron would succeed Area Rep. Cordel Hyde as the PUP standard bearer in the Lake Independence constituency, as Hyde was standing down at the upcoming general election.

The following week, it came to light that Schakron was a dual citizen of Belize and the United States citizen when a photocopy of a United States passport issued to her in 2002 was published in the media. When questioned about the matter at a press conference, Schakron gave an impassioned response in which she declared herself "as Belizean as rice and beans" and stated that she would renounce her U.S. citizenship. She referred further questions on the matter to party lawyer and communications director Lisa Shoman. Soon after, she was seen at the United States embassy in Belmopan; on 15 February, she confirmed that she had initiated the renunciation procedure during that visit. She stated that her appointment to take the oath of renunciation was 21 February 2012, which would fall after Nomination Day. She also stated that the passport had been stolen from her residence, and accused the United Democratic Party of complicity in its theft. She later stated that a family member had been involved and she would not be filing any charges. It was suggested that the PUP might tap Carlos Diaz, former Minister of Energy and Communications to run in Schakron's place; however, Diaz stated that he would be running as an independent instead. On 17 February, it was confirmed that election officer Noreen Fairweather had rejected Schakron's candidacy filing. Schakron's brother Martin Galvez announced his candidacy in her place. UDP candidate Mark King would go on to win the election for the Lake Independence seat.

=== Court cases ===
On 17 February 2012, the same day that Schakron filed her candidacy, Schakron's lawyer Lisa Shoman filed suit in the Supreme Court of Belize for an injunction to prevent Fairweather from blocking Schakron's candidacy; however, Justice Oswell Legall denied Shoman's application, stating that he could not review Fairweather's decision until it had been formally announced. After an adjournment, Legall returned to inform Shoman that Fairweather had indeed disallowed Schakron's candidacy. Shoman requested leave to file an amended application, and drafted one on the spot and read it aloud off her notebook to the judge. Legall decided to allow this unusual method of filing an amended application given the urgency of the matter; however, in the end he ruled against Schakron.

On 22 March, Shoman filed another application on Schakron's behalf, seeking to challenge King's election. However, the following week, Chief Justice Kenneth Benjamin announced that he had rejected the newest application as well. In early April, her brother Martin Galvez filed a motion for an election petition to overturn King's candidacy on the grounds that he had not disclosed certain contracts held by his private security company; Benjamin allowed the case to move forward. Through the case, the PUP sought to force a by-election, in which Schakron might be a candidate. However, on 19 May, Benjamin ruled against Galvez, ruling that Constitution of Belize §58(1)(h) did not require disclosure of contracts such as the one King's company allegedly had.

=== 2015 mayoral campaign ===
Schakron was the PUP nominee for Mayor of Belize City in March 2015 but was defeated by the UDP incumbent, Darrell Bradley.

== Death of ex-husband ==
Tragedy struck Schakron's family again in October 2012 when her ex-husband Alfred Schakron was murdered in broad daylight, leaving their children fatherless and police mystified as to the identity or motive of the killers. After his death, Yolanda stayed out of the public eye for more than half a year, finally making a public appearance in June 2013 at a protest march outside Karl Heusner Memorial Hospital set up by Citizens Organized for Liberty through Action (COLA); COLA held the protest to express their anger at the results of an investigation into the deaths of thirteen premature babies, seven from an outbreak of Enterobacter cloacae. Schakron stated she was motivated to come out in order to prevent others from needlessly losing their loved ones as she had, to prevent the hospital from covering up the issue, and to raise funds for indigent families of victims to hire a lawyer and possibly pursue legal action.
