= Cayo South =

Electoral constituency in Belize

- Constituency for the Belize House of Representatives
- District: Cayo
- Electorate: 6,905 (2012)
- Major settlements: Valley of Peace, Armenia

Current constituency
- Created: 1961
- Party: People's United Party
- Area Representative: Julius Espat

Cayo South is an electoral constituency in the Cayo District represented in the House of Representatives of the National Assembly of Belize since 2012 by Julius Espat of the People's United Party.

== Profile ==
The Cayo South constituency was created for the 1961 general election as part of a major nationwide redistricting. The largely rural constituency consists of approximately two-thirds of the Cayo District, stretching north and east from the Guatemalan border in the west up to the border with the Orange Walk District in the north. Cayo South is geographically the largest constituency in the country.

Prior to 2008 Cayo South included the Belizean capital city, Belmopan, after which the city was represented by its own constituency.

== Area representatives ==
Election	Area representative	Party
1961	Santiago Perdomo	PUP
1965	Santiago Perdomo	PUP
1969	Santiago Perdomo	PUP
1974	Santiago Perdomo	PUP
1979	Sam Waight	PUP
1984	Sam Waight	PUP
1989	Sam Waight	PUP
1993	Sam Waight	PUP
1998	Agripino Cawich	PUP
2003	Agripino Cawich	PUP
2003 by-election	John Saldivar	UDP
2008	Ramon Witz	UDP
2012	Julius Espat	PUP
2015	Julius Espat	PUP
2020	Julius Espat	PUP
2025	Julius Espat	PUP

== Elections ==
Election	Political result	Candidate	Party	Votes	%	±%
2025 general election Electorate: 8,244; Turnout: 5,177 (62.80%) −11.62	PUP hold Majority: 3,966 (76.61%) +19.55	Julius Espat	PUP	4,476	86.46	+7.93
2025 general election Electorate: 8,244; Turnout: 5,177 (62.80%) −11.62	PUP hold Majority: 3,966 (76.61%) +19.55	June Young	UDP	510	9.85	−11.62
2025 general election Electorate: 8,244; Turnout: 5,177 (62.80%) −11.62	PUP hold Majority: 3,966 (76.61%) +19.55	Jose Antonio Samayoa	UDP	67	1.29	−20.18
2020 general election Electorate: 7,069; Turnout: 5,261 (74.42%) +5.76	PUP hold Majority: 2,958 (57.06%) +35.22	Julius Espat	PUP	4,071	78.53	+19.65
2020 general election Electorate: 7,069; Turnout: 5,261 (74.42%) +5.76	PUP hold Majority: 2,958 (57.06%) +35.22	Ramon Francisco Witz	UDP	1,113	21.47	−15.57
2015 general election Electorate: 7,442; Turnout: 5,108 (68.64%) −6.96	PUP hold Majority: 1,116 (21.84%) +3.79	Julius Espat	PUP	3,008	58.88	+0.43
2015 general election Electorate: 7,442; Turnout: 5,108 (68.64%) −6.96	PUP hold Majority: 1,116 (21.84%) +3.79	Ralph Huang	UDP	1,892	37.04	−3.36
2015 general election Electorate: 7,442; Turnout: 5,108 (68.64%) −6.96	PUP hold Majority: 1,116 (21.84%) +3.79	Andrew Williams	BPP	77	1.51	-
2015 general election Electorate: 7,442; Turnout: 5,108 (68.64%) −6.96	PUP hold Majority: 1,116 (21.84%) +3.79	John Banner	Independent	57	1.12	-
2012 general election Electorate: 6,905; Turnout: 5,220 (75.6%) −1.7	PUP gain from UDP; Majority: 942 (18.05%) +6.6	Julius Espat	PUP	3,051	58.45	+17.94
2012 general election Electorate: 6,905; Turnout: 5,220 (75.6%) −1.7	PUP gain from UDP; Majority: 942 (18.05%) +6.6	Ramon Witz	UDP	2,109	40.4	−12.02
2008 general election Electorate: 5,871; Turnout: 4,538 (77.3%) +4.67	UDP hold Majority: 520 (11.45%) +9.74	Ramon Witz	UDP	2,379	52.42	+1.94
2008 general election Electorate: 5,871; Turnout: 4,538 (77.3%) +4.67	UDP hold Majority: 520 (11.45%) +9.74	Charles Galvez	PUP	1,859	40.97	−7.8
2008 general election Electorate: 5,871; Turnout: 4,538 (77.3%) +4.67	UDP hold Majority: 520 (11.45%) +9.74	Richard Smith	NBA	159	3.5	-
2008 general election Electorate: 5,871; Turnout: 4,538 (77.3%) +4.67	UDP hold Majority: 520 (11.45%) +9.74	Hubert Enriquez	VIP	96	2.12	-
October 2003 by-election Electorate: 8,814; Turnout: 6,402 (72.63%) −2.72	UDP gain from PUP; Majority: 110 (1.71%) +1.33	John Saldivar	UDP	3,232	50.48	+1.31
October 2003 by-election Electorate: 8,814; Turnout: 6,402 (72.63%) −2.72	UDP gain from PUP; Majority: 110 (1.71%) +1.33	Joaquin Cawich	PUP	3,122	48.77	−0.78
2003 general election Electorate: 8,344; Turnout: 6,278 (75.35%) −12.23	PUP hold Majority: 24 (0.38%) −32.12	Agripino Cawich	PUP	3,111	49.55	−12.69
2003 general election Electorate: 8,344; Turnout: 6,278 (75.35%) −12.23	PUP hold Majority: 24 (0.38%) −32.12	John Saldivar	UDP	3,087	49.17	+19.43
1998 general election Electorate: 5,186; Turnout: 4,542 (87.58%) +18.44	PUP hold Majority: 1,476 (32.5%) +26.1	Agripino Cawich	PUP	2,827	62.24	+9.64
1998 general election Electorate: 5,186; Turnout: 4,542 (87.58%) +18.44	PUP hold Majority: 1,476 (32.5%) +26.1	John Saldivar	UDP	1,351	29.74	−16.46
1998 general election Electorate: 5,186; Turnout: 4,542 (87.58%) +18.44	PUP hold Majority: 1,476 (32.5%) +26.1	Ismael "Miley" Garcia	Independent	272	5.99	-
1998 general election Electorate: 5,186; Turnout: 4,542 (87.58%) +18.44	PUP hold Majority: 1,476 (32.5%) +26.1	Melvin Hulse Sr.	NABR	43	0.95	-
1998 general election Electorate: 5,186; Turnout: 4,542 (87.58%) +18.44	PUP hold Majority: 1,476 (32.5%) +26.1	Rodolfo (Dopo) Lopez	PDP	14	0.31	-
1993 general election Electorate: 3,795; Turnout: 2,624 (69.14%) −5.32	PUP hold Majority: 167 (6.4%) −15.2	Sam Waight	PUP	1,379	52.6	−7.2
1993 general election Electorate: 3,795; Turnout: 2,624 (69.14%) −5.32	PUP hold Majority: 167 (6.4%) −15.2	Melvin Hulse Sr.	UDP	1,212	46.2	+8.0
1993 general election Electorate: 3,795; Turnout: 2,624 (69.14%) −5.32	PUP hold Majority: 167 (6.4%) −15.2	Curnell Garbutt	Independent	33	1.3	-
1989 general election Electorate: 3,199; Turnout: 2,382 (74.46%) −1.21	PUP hold Majority: 515 (21.6%) +19.5	Sam Waight	PUP	1,425	59.8	+9.8
1989 general election Electorate: 3,199; Turnout: 2,382 (74.46%) −1.21	PUP hold Majority: 515 (21.6%) +19.5	Phillip Brackett	UDP	910	38.2	−9.7
1984 general election Electorate: 2,277; Turnout: 1,723 (75.67%) −14.21	PUP hold Majority: 36 (2.1%) −9.9	Sam Waight	PUP	861	50.0	−5.2
1984 general election Electorate: 2,277; Turnout: 1,723 (75.67%) −14.21	PUP hold Majority: 36 (2.1%) −9.9	Harold Flowers	UDP	825	47.9	+4.7
1979 general election Electorate: 3,181; Turnout: 2,859 (89.88%) +16.46	PUP hold Majority: 12.0% (−11.1)	Sam Waight	PUP		55.2	−4.6
1979 general election Electorate: 3,181; Turnout: 2,859 (89.88%) +16.46	PUP hold Majority: 12.0% (−11.1)	Teodosio Ochoa	UDP		43.2	+6.5
1974 general election Electorate: 2,310; Turnout: 1,696 (73.42%) −0.51	PUP hold Majority: 23.1% (+12.1)	Santiago Perdomo	PUP		59.8	+9.8
1974 general election Electorate: 2,310; Turnout: 1,696 (73.42%) −0.51	PUP hold Majority: 23.1% (+12.1)	Pedro Mena	UDP		36.7	-
1969 general election Electorate: 1,565; Turnout: 1,157 (73.93%) +2.84	PUP hold Majority: 11.0% (−12.4)	Santiago Perdomo	PUP		50.0	−9.9
1969 general election Electorate: 1,565; Turnout: 1,157 (73.93%) +2.84	PUP hold Majority: 11.0% (−12.4)	Pedro Mena	NIP		39.0	+2.5
1969 general election Electorate: 1,565; Turnout: 1,157 (73.93%) +2.84	PUP hold Majority: 11.0% (−12.4)	Miguel Ruiz	Independent		8.8	-
1965 general election Electorate: 1,771; Turnout: 1,259 (71.09%) −10.85	PUP hold Majority: 23.4% (−7.9)	Santiago Perdomo	PUP		59.9	−1.4
1965 general election Electorate: 1,771; Turnout: 1,259 (71.09%) −10.85	PUP hold Majority: 23.4% (−7.9)	Pedro Mena	NIP		36.5	+30.7
1961 general election Electorate: 1,174; Turnout: 962 (81.94%) n/a	PUP win Majority: 31.3% (n/a)	Santiago Perdomo	PUP		61.3	-
1961 general election Electorate: 1,174; Turnout: 962 (81.94%) n/a	PUP win Majority: 31.3% (n/a)	Eduardo Espat	CDP		30.0	-
1961 general election Electorate: 1,174; Turnout: 962 (81.94%) n/a	PUP win Majority: 31.3% (n/a)	Pedro Mena	NIP		5.8	-
