= Lake Independence (Belize House constituency) =

- Constituency for the Belize House of Representatives
- District: Belize
- Electorate: 4,863 (2020)
- Major settlements: Belize City (part)

Current constituency
- Created: 1984
- Party: People's United Party
- Area Representative: Cordel Hyde

Lake Independence, often known simply as Lake I, is an electoral constituency in the Belize District represented in the House of Representatives of the National Assembly of Belize since 2015 by Cordel Hyde. Hyde previously served as area representative from 1998 to 2012.

== Profile ==
The Lake Independence constituency was one of 10 new seats created for the 1984 general election. It occupies portions of western and southern Belize City, bordering the Belize Rural Central, Freetown, Pickstock, Collet and Port Loyola constituencies.

== Area representatives ==
Election	Area representative	Party
1984	Hubert Elrington	UDP
1989	Carlos Diaz	PUP
1993	Hubert Elrington	UDP
1998	Cordel Hyde	PUP
2003	Cordel Hyde	PUP
2008	Cordel Hyde	PUP
2012	Mark King	UDP
2015	Cordel Hyde	PUP
2020	Cordel Hyde	PUP
2025	Cordel Hyde	PUP

== Elections ==
Election	Political result	Candidate	Party	Votes	%	±%
2025 general election Electorate: 6,807; Turnout: 5,006 (73.54%) -7.85	PUP hold Majority: 4,695 (93.78%) +13.44	Cordel Hyde	PUP	4,806	96.00	+6.59
2025 general election Electorate: 6,807; Turnout: 5,006 (73.54%) -7.85	PUP hold Majority: 4,695 (93.78%) +13.44	Cecil Jenkins	UDP	92	1.84	−7.23
2025 general election Electorate: 6,807; Turnout: 5,006 (73.54%) -7.85	PUP hold Majority: 4,695 (93.78%) +13.44	Samuel Cutkelvin	UDP	19	0.38	−8.69
2020 general election Electorate: 4,863; Turnout: 3,958 (81.39%) +12.39	PUP hold Majority: 3,180 (80.34%) +51.57	Cordel Hyde	PUP	3,539	89.41	+17.89
2020 general election Electorate: 4,863; Turnout: 3,958 (81.39%) +12.39	PUP hold Majority: 3,180 (80.34%) +51.57	Dianne "Miss D" Finnegan	UDP	359	9.07	−16.69
2015 general election Electorate: 6,305; Turnout: 4,368 (69.0%) +6.0	PUP gain from UDP; Majority: 1,999 (28.87%) +23.52	Cordel Hyde	PUP	3,124	71.52	+45.76
2015 general election Electorate: 6,305; Turnout: 4,368 (69.0%) +6.0	PUP gain from UDP; Majority: 1,999 (28.87%) +23.52	Mark King	UDP	1,125	25.76	−22.24
2015 general election Electorate: 6,305; Turnout: 4,368 (69.0%) +6.0	PUP gain from UDP; Majority: 1,999 (28.87%) +23.52	Richard "Lizard" McCaulay	BPP	63	1.44	-
2012 general election Electorate: 5,145; Turnout: 3,217 (63.0%) −9.2	UDP gain from PUP; Majority: 172 (5.35%) −4.83	Mark King	UDP	1,544	48.0	+4.5
2012 general election Electorate: 5,145; Turnout: 3,217 (63.0%) −9.2	UDP gain from PUP; Majority: 172 (5.35%) −4.83	Martin Galvez	PUP	1,372	42.65	−11.03
2012 general election Electorate: 5,145; Turnout: 3,217 (63.0%) −9.2	UDP gain from PUP; Majority: 172 (5.35%) −4.83	Carlos Diaz	Independent	223	6.93	-
2008 general election Electorate: 5,155; Turnout: 3,722 (72.2%) +0.2	PUP hold Majority: 379 (10.18%) −17.88	Cordel Hyde	PUP	1,998	53.68	−7.63
2008 general election Electorate: 5,155; Turnout: 3,722 (72.2%) +0.2	PUP hold Majority: 379 (10.18%) −17.88	Vandley Rupert Jenkins	UDP	1,619	43.5	+10.25
2008 general election Electorate: 5,155; Turnout: 3,722 (72.2%) +0.2	PUP hold Majority: 379 (10.18%) −17.88	Gary Lambey	NRP	36	0.97	-
2008 general election Electorate: 5,155; Turnout: 3,722 (72.2%) +0.2	PUP hold Majority: 379 (10.18%) −17.88	Joseph "Seagull" Martinez	VIP	36	0.97	-
2003 general election Electorate: 6,175; Turnout: 4,508 (72.0%) −15.35	PUP hold Majority: 1,265 (28.06%) −10.71	Cordel Hyde	PUP	2,764	61.31	−7.59
2003 general election Electorate: 6,175; Turnout: 4,508 (72.0%) −15.35	PUP hold Majority: 1,265 (28.06%) −10.71	Anthony Leslie	UDP	1,499	33.25	+3.12
2003 general election Electorate: 6,175; Turnout: 4,508 (72.0%) −15.35	PUP hold Majority: 1,265 (28.06%) −10.71	Patrick Rogers	Independent	96	2.12	-
2003 general election Electorate: 6,175; Turnout: 4,508 (72.0%) −15.35	PUP hold Majority: 1,265 (28.06%) −10.71	Hubert Elrington	Independent	88	1.95	-
1998 general election Electorate: 4,024; Turnout: 3,515 (87.35%) +27.31	PUP gain from UDP; Majority: 1,363 (38.77%) +33.97	Cordel Hyde	PUP	2,422	68.9	+21.3
1998 general election Electorate: 4,024; Turnout: 3,515 (87.35%) +27.31	PUP gain from UDP; Majority: 1,363 (38.77%) +33.97	Hubert Elrington	UDP	1,059	30.13	−22.27
1998 general election Electorate: 4,024; Turnout: 3,515 (87.35%) +27.31	PUP gain from UDP; Majority: 1,363 (38.77%) +33.97	Jose Sosa	PDP	12	0.34	-
1998 general election Electorate: 4,024; Turnout: 3,515 (87.35%) +27.31	PUP gain from UDP; Majority: 1,363 (38.77%) +33.97	Jorge Ernesto Babb	NRTCP	7	0.2	-
1993 general election Electorate: 4,139; Turnout: 2,485 (60.04%) −2.61	UDP gain from PUP; Majority: 117 (4.8%) −0.6	Hubert Elrington	UDP	1,301	52.4	+6.2
1993 general election Electorate: 4,139; Turnout: 2,485 (60.04%) −2.61	UDP gain from PUP; Majority: 117 (4.8%) −0.6	Carlos Diaz	PUP	1,184	47.6	−4.0
1989 general election Electorate: 3,376; Turnout: 2,115 (62.65%) −7.15	PUP gain from UDP; Majority: 113 (5.4%) −0.7	Carlos Diaz	PUP	1,091	51.6	+5.3
1989 general election Electorate: 3,376; Turnout: 2,115 (62.65%) −7.15	PUP gain from UDP; Majority: 113 (5.4%) −0.7	Hubert Elrington	UDP	978	46.2	−6.2
1984 general election Electorate: 2,460; Turnout: 1,717 (69.8%) n/a	UDP win Majority: 105 (6.1%) n/a	Hubert Elrington	UDP	723	52.4	-
1984 general election Electorate: 2,460; Turnout: 1,717 (69.8%) n/a	UDP win Majority: 105 (6.1%) n/a	Carlos Diaz	PUP	618	46.3	-
