= 文正 =

Chinese name
- Chinese: 文正
Transcriptions
Standard Mandarin
- Hanyu Pinyin: Wénzhèng
- Bopomofo: ㄨㄣˊ ㄓㄥˋ

Vietnamese name
- Vietnamese alphabet: Văn Chính
- Hán-Nôm: 文正

Korean name
- Hangul: 문정
- Hanja: 文正
Transcriptions
- Revised Romanization: Munjeong
- McCune–Reischauer: Munjŏng

Japanese name
- Kanji: 文正
- Hiragana: ぶんしょう
Transcriptions
- Romanization: Bunshō

文正 may refer to:

- Bunshō, Japanese era name corresponding to February 1466 through March 1467

As a given name:

- Dennis Peng (彭文正, born 1961), journalist from Taiwan
- Eric Chang (Belizean politician) (張文正, born 1979), Belizean politician from Taiwan
- Liu Wen-cheng (劉文正, born 1952), Taiwanese singer and movie actor
- Man-Ching Donald Yu (余文正, born 1980), Hong Kong composer
- Mochtar Riady (李文正, born 1929), Indonesian businessman who founded the Lippo Group
- Wayne Pai (白文正, 1952–2008), Taiwanese businessman who founded the Polaris Group

As a posthumous name:

- Sima Guang (1019–1086), Song dynasty historian
- Yelü Chucai (1190–1244), Liao dynasty Khitan statesman
- Cho Kwangjo (1482–1509), Joseon dynasty Korean neo-Confucian scholar
- Song Jun-gil (1606–1672), Joseon dynasty Korean scholar and official
- Song Siyeol (1607–1689), Joseon dynasty Korean scholar and official
- Zeng Guofan (1811–1872), Qing dynasty Chinese official and general
