= Khalid Belisle =

Belizean politician

Mayor of Belmopan, Belize
- Incumbent
- Assumed office 4 March 2015
- Preceded by: Simeon López

Personal details
- Born: 1981 (age 44–45) Belize
- Party: United Democratic Party
- Spouse: Jenny Lee Banner
- Profession: Politician

Khalid Belisle (born 1981) is a Belizean politician. He has served as mayor of Belmopan since 2015. Belisle is a member of the United Democratic Party.

A protege of UDP Area Rep. John Saldivar, in August 2008 Belisle unsuccessfully challenged the incumbent, Simeon López, for the UDP nomination in the 2009 municipal election.

Belisle secured the UDP mayoral nomination in Belmopan in 2015 and won in a five-way race, succeeding López.

Belisle appears on the official Educo Seminar website, which appears in the footer of the Belize Natural Energy website, that claims Belisle has attended a seminar and became the youngest mayor of Belmopan because this goal was "made into a program".

Belisle indicated he was returning to being a private citizen, stepping down from the race for the Belmopan constituency in December 2022.
