= Toledo East =

Electoral constituency in Belize

- Constituency for the Belize House of Representatives
- District: Toledo
- Electorate: 6,640 (2012)
- Major settlements: Punta Gorda, Monkey River Town

Current constituency
- Created: 1984
- Party: People's United Party
- Area Representative: Michael Espat

Toledo East is an electoral constituency in the Toledo District represented in the House of Representatives of the National Assembly of Belize since 2012 by Michael Espat of the People's United Party. Espat also served several non-consecutive terms in the constituency dating back to 1989.

== Profile ==
The Toledo East constituency was one of 10 new seats created for the 1984 general election. It is one of two constituencies in the rural Toledo District of southern Belize, currently comprising the district's coastal areas including Punta Gorda and Monkey River Town.

Toledo East is a very competitive constituency, routinely changing hands between the PUP and the UDP since its creation. In 2003 Espat became the constituency's only Area Representative re-elected to a consecutive term to date.

== Area representatives ==
Election	Area representative	Party
1984	Charles Wagner	UDP
1989	Michael Espat	PUP
1993	Joseph Cayetano	UDP
1998	Michael Espat	PUP
2003	Michael Espat	PUP
2008	Eden Martinez	UDP
2012	Michael Espat	PUP
2015	Michael Espat	PUP
2020	Michael Espat	PUP

== Elections ==
Election	Political result	Candidate	Party	Votes	%	±%
2025 general election Electorate: 8,554; Turnout: 5,537 (64.73%) −4.04	PUP hold Majority: 4,648 (83.94%) +60.00	Osmond Martinez	PUP	5,032	90.88	+29.23
2025 general election Electorate: 8,554; Turnout: 5,537 (64.73%) −4.04	PUP hold Majority: 4,648 (83.94%) +60.00	William Anthony Maheia	PNP	384	6.94	-
2025 general election Electorate: 8,554; Turnout: 5,537 (64.73%) −4.04	PUP hold Majority: 4,648 (83.94%) +60.00	Orlando Albert Muschamp	Independent Politician	37	0.67	-
2020 general election Electorate: 6,831; Turnout: 4,698 (68.77%) −1.85	PUP hold Majority: 1,114 (23.94%) +20.26	Michael Espat	PUP	2,869	61.65	+12.40
2020 general election Electorate: 6,831; Turnout: 4,698 (68.77%) −1.85	PUP hold Majority: 1,114 (23.94%) +20.26	Dennis Garbutt	UDP	1,755	37.71	-7.86
2020 general election Electorate: 6,831; Turnout: 4,698 (68.77%) −1.85	PUP hold Majority: 1,114 (23.94%) +20.26	Mateo Tomas Polanco	Independent Politician	9	0.11	-
2015 general election Electorate: 7,727; Turnout: 5,457 (70.62%) −2.20	PUP hold Majority: 200 (3.68%) −3.35	Michael Espat	PUP	2,687	49.25	−0.74
2015 general election Electorate: 7,727; Turnout: 5,457 (70.62%) −2.20	PUP hold Majority: 200 (3.68%) −3.35	Peter Martinez	UDP	2,487	45.57	-1.03
2015 general election Electorate: 7,727; Turnout: 5,457 (70.62%) −2.20	PUP hold Majority: 200 (3.68%) −3.35	Wil Maheia	BPP	225	4.12	-
2015 general election Electorate: 7,727; Turnout: 5,457 (70.62%) −2.20	PUP hold Majority: 200 (3.68%) −3.35	Llewellyn Lucas	BGIP	5	0.09	−0.95
2012 general election Electorate: 6,640; Turnout: 4,835 (72.82%) −3.62	PUP gain from UDP; Majority: 340 (7.03%) −10.31	Michael Espat	PUP	2,417	49.99	+12.83
2012 general election Electorate: 6,640; Turnout: 4,835 (72.82%) −3.62	PUP gain from UDP; Majority: 340 (7.03%) −10.31	Eden Martinez	UDP	2,077	42.96	−11.54
2012 general election Electorate: 6,640; Turnout: 4,835 (72.82%) −3.62	PUP gain from UDP; Majority: 340 (7.03%) −10.31	Wil Maheia	PNP	282	5.83	−0.95
2008 general election Electorate: 5,773; Turnout: 4.413 (76.44%) −1.45	UDP gain from PUP; Majority: 765 (17.34%) +11.72	Eden Martinez	UDP	2,405	54.50	+7,89
2008 general election Electorate: 5,773; Turnout: 4.413 (76.44%) −1.45	UDP gain from PUP; Majority: 765 (17.34%) +11.72	Michael Espat	PUP	1,640	37.16	−15.07
2008 general election Electorate: 5,773; Turnout: 4.413 (76.44%) −1.45	UDP gain from PUP; Majority: 765 (17.34%) +11.72	Wil Maheia	PNP	299	6.78	-
2008 general election Electorate: 5,773; Turnout: 4.413 (76.44%) −1.45	UDP gain from PUP; Majority: 765 (17.34%) +11.72	Herman Marion Lewis	Independent	35	0.79	-
2003 general election Electorate: 4,269; Turnout: 3,325 (77.89%) −9.18	PUP hold Majority: 189 (5.62%) −11.49	Michael Espat	PUP	1,757	52.23	−5.49
2003 general election Electorate: 4,269; Turnout: 3,325 (77.89%) −9.18	PUP hold Majority: 189 (5.62%) −11.49	Eden Martinez	UDP	1,568	46.61	+6.0
1998 general election Electorate: 4,533; Turnout: 3,947 (87.07%) +9.18	PUP gain from UDP; Majority: 675 (17.11%) +16.91	Michael Espat	PUP	2,278	57.72	+7.82
1998 general election Electorate: 4,533; Turnout: 3,947 (87.07%) +9.18	PUP gain from UDP; Majority: 675 (17.11%) +16.91	Ryan Kenneth Pennell	UDP	1,603	40.61	−9.49
1998 general election Electorate: 4,533; Turnout: 3,947 (87.07%) +9.18	PUP gain from UDP; Majority: 675 (17.11%) +16.91	Maximiliano Requena	NABR	30	0.76	-
1993 general election Electorate: 4,135; Turnout: 3,100 (74.97%) +1.07	UDP gain from PUP; Majority: 4 (0.2%) −5.0	Joseph Cayetano	UDP	1,552	50.1	+3.3
1993 general election Electorate: 4,135; Turnout: 3,100 (74.97%) +1.07	UDP gain from PUP; Majority: 4 (0.2%) −5.0	Michael Espat	PUP	1,548	49.9	−2.1
1989 general election Electorate: 3,375; Turnout: 2,494 (73.9%) +0.5	PUP gain from UDP; Majority: 130 (5.2%) −18.0	Michael Espat	PUP	1,298	52.0	+8.7
1989 general election Electorate: 3,375; Turnout: 2,494 (73.9%) +0.5	PUP gain from UDP; Majority: 130 (5.2%) −18.0	Charles Wagner	UDP	1,168	46.8	−19.7
1984 general election Electorate: 2,293; Turnout: 1,683 (73.4%) n/a	UDP win Majority: 199 (23.2%) n/a	Charles Wagner	UDP	927	66.5	-
1984 general election Electorate: 2,293; Turnout: 1,683 (73.4%) n/a	UDP win Majority: 199 (23.2%) n/a	Liegh Usher	PUP	728	43.3	-
