= Doris June Garcia =

Politician in Belize

President of the Belize Senate
- In office 21 December 1984 – 31 July 1989
- Prime Minister: Manuel Esquivel
- Preceded by: Gadsby Ramos
- Succeeded by: Jane Ellen Usher

Personal details
- Born: 7 March 1942 (age 84)
- Party: United Democratic Party (Belize)

Doris June Tomasa Garcia (née Cayetano; born 7 March 1942) is a Belizean farmer, business owner, and politician. She was the first woman to serve as President of the Senate of Belize.

== Biography ==
Garcia was born in Dangriga, Stann Creek District where she attended Sacred Heart Primary School and Austin High School. She completed agricultural training in Tegucigalpa, Honduras. Garcia was a farmer and a member of the Citrus Growers Association. She also was the proprietor of June's Beauty Cove as Dangriga's first licensed cosmetologist.

== Career ==
In 1983, Garcia ran for a seat on the Dangriga Town Council. She served as deputy mayor from 1983 to 1985. In the 1984 Belizean general election, Garcia sought the UDP nomination for the Dangriga constituency of the Belize House of Representatives, losing to Henry Anderson. Following the primary election, Garcia pledged her support for Anderson's candidacy and Anderson expressed his appreciation to Garcia.

In 1984, Prime Minister Manuel Esquivel offered to appoint her as President of the Senate, which she accepted. Garcia served from 21 December 1984 until 31 July 31 1989.

On 26 March 2026, Garcia made a special return visit to the National Assembly Building of Belize in recognition of her accomplishments, where she was welcomed by President of the Senate Carolyn Trench Sandiford. Garcia unveiled an updated portrait of herself in the National Assembly foyer, received a guided tour of the renovated National Assembly building, and met privately with President of the Senate Sandiford.
