= 2015 Belizean municipal elections =

2015 Elections in Belize

Municipal elections were held in Belize on 4 March 2015. Voters elected 67 representatives, 18 on city councils and 49 on town councils. The elections were a decisive victory for the ruling United Democratic Party, which won 62 out of the 67 seats nationwide. The opposition People's United Party won the remaining seats, losing control of town councils in Dangriga and Punta Gorda, maintaining a majority only in Orange Walk Town.

== Participating parties ==
- United Democratic Party
- People's United Party
- Vision Inspired by the People (Belmopan and San Pedro Town only)
- People's National Party (Punta Gorda only)

== Results ==
=== Belize City ===
Belize City Mayor Darrell Bradley was re-elected to a second term on the UDP ticket with 63 percent of the vote, defeating PUP nominee Yolanda Schakron and independent candidate Eustaquio "Ernesto" Torres. The UDP also swept all 10 seats on the Belize City Council.

=== Belmopan ===
In Belmopan, UDP mayoral candidate Khalid Belisle defeated the PUP's Jose Amilcar Chacon and the VIP's Hubert Dennis Enriquez. The UDP also won all six city council seats.

=== Towns ===
- Benque Viejo del Carmen: Heraldo "Rancha" Ramcharan Jr. (UDP) elected mayor; UDP wins town council 6–0.
- Corozal Town: Hilberto Campos (UDP) elected mayor; UDP wins town council 6–0.
- Dangriga: Francis Humphreys (UDP) elected mayor; UDP wins town council 6–0.
- Orange Walk Town: Kevin Bernard (PUP) elected mayor; PUP wins town council 4–2.
- Punta Gorda: Fern Gutierrez (UDP) elected mayor; UDP wins town council 6–0.
- San Ignacio/Santa Elena: Earl Trapp (UDP) elected mayor; UDP wins town council 6–0.
- San Pedro Town: Daniel Guerrero (UDP) elected mayor; UDP wins town council 6–0.
