= Alfred Schakron =

Belizean businessman and murder victim

- Born: Fouad Schakron; 6 June 1961; Sidon District, Lebanon
- Died: 24 October 2012 (aged 51); Belize City, Belize
- Spouse: Yolanda Schakron (divorced)
- Children: 2

Fouad "Alfred" Schakron (Arabic: فؤاد شكرون; 6 June 1961 – 24 October 2012) was a Belizean businessman and the ex-husband of People's United Party political hopeful Yolanda Schakron. He was murdered in broad daylight outside a Belize City gym, leaving police mystified as to the motive or the identity of the killers.

== Biography ==
Shakroun was born and raised in Sidon District, Lebanon. He came from a large family of nine people, among whom he was one of six who chose to emigrate from Lebanon. He came to Belize in the mid-1990s, and had lived there for 16 years by the time of his death. He was involved in a variety of businesses. He owned J.E.C. Pawnshop, and was also co-owner along with noted pedophile Joseph Marinan of Belize's MegaBingo. He was astute at business and achieved financial success, enabling him to live in a three-storey mansion in Buttonwood Bay with two maids.

In 2007, Schakron was involved in a land deal gone bad, in which he apparently paid BZ$575,000 to Jose Coye in order to purchase land at Newtown Barrack Road. Allegedly, the government of Belize sold the land to Coye for BZ$20,000, while Coye pocketed the difference. Schakron alleged that Coye's driver later returned BZ$300,000 to Schakron, but that the balance of BZ$275,000 was not returned. Schakron made a complaint to police about the matter, which led to both Coye and his driver being charged with theft and obtaining property by deception. The charges against the two were dismissed in July 2008. Coye later retained lawyers Elson Kaseke and Anthony Sylvestre and filed suit against Schakron for malicious prosecution in relation to the incident. Schakron was defended by Rodwell Williams. The matter came before Justice Oswell Legall, who in 2010 ruled against Coye and ordered him to pay Schakron's legal costs. Legall stated that he did not believe Coye's statements and was furthermore concerned about the chilling effect the case might have on private citizens reporting potentially unlawful activity to the police.

In 2011, a relative of Schakron's who worked at MegaBingo made allegations of sexual harassment, leading to the departure from Belize of Schakron's business partner Joseph Marinan; Schakron indicated in media comments that the views Marinan had expressed about the incident were his own and did not represent the company's opinion.

Schakron was formerly married to Yolanda Schakron, with whom he had two children, but then divorced. He later remarried.

== Death ==
On the morning of 24 October 2012, Schakron went to the Body 2000 Gym on Coney Drive in Belize City for a morning workout. According to witnesses, at 9:30 as Schakron exited the gym, a black Ford Escape turned the corner from Princess Margaret Drive at high speed and stopped in front of him. The gunman alighted and had a conversation or argument with Schakron in a foreign language, possibly Arabic. He then shot Schakron four times in the neck, chest, and left side, wounding him fatally, and returned to his vehicle which sped off down Coney Drive. Three men came along in another vehicle, inspected Schakron's body, and then drove away as well. Schakron was taken to Karl Heusner Memorial Hospital across the street, but was declared dead on arrival. His body was buried in the town of Irkay in Lebanon.

Schakron was the second man of Lebanese extraction to be murdered in Belize City in the space of less than a day, a fact made all the more remarkable because there are only 240 Lebanese people residing in Belize. Police had no immediate leads or motive for the murder. Minister of National Security John Saldivar stated that Schakron's killing did not seem to fit into the general pattern of the ongoing crime wave in Belize, and suggested that both Schakron and Dib might have been targeted specifically.

With no partners or experienced personnel immediately available to take over management duties, Schakron's businesses went into temporary shutdowns so that his family could have time to mourn. Mega Bingo first announced a temporary hiatus and then stated in an advertisement that it would close "until further notice"; J.E.C. Pawn Shop also stated that it would be closed.

== See also ==
- List of unsolved murders in Belize
