= Eric Chang (politician) =

Belizean politician

- Traditional Chinese: 張文正
- Simplified Chinese: 张文正
Transcriptions
Standard Mandarin
- Hanyu Pinyin: Zhāng Wénzhèng

Eric Chang is a Belizean politician.

== Career ==
Chang entered electoral politics in 2008, winning the United Democratic Party's nomination as a candidate for the Belize City Council in the following year's municipal elections. He was the first Belizean from Taiwan to win a nomination from a major party, receiving 2,970 votes, just nine fewer than incumbent Wayne Usher. In the actual elections the following March, he received 9,428 votes, putting him at the top of the charts above fellow newcomer Roger Espejo, making him the first ethnic Chinese to be elected to public office. He also serves on occasion as a court interpreter for Chinese-speaking witnesses and suspects.

== Personal life ==
Chang, who is of Chinese descent, was born in Taiwan and came to Belize in 1993 at age 14. In April 2011, the Belize City Customs Department seized his Isuzu D-Max, alleging that customs duties had not been paid on it. His house was also raided. Chang described the incident as a misunderstanding, stating that he had purchased the vehicle used in Belize with all proper paperwork attached, and suggested that the police might have received incorrect information. The Belize Times speculated there was a conspiracy behind the incident, and suggested that it could be intra-UDP fighting between Chang and Lee Mark Chang or even PM Dean Barrow.
