= Agripino =

Agripino is a male Portuguese and Spanish given name. Notable people with the name include:

== Given names ==
- Agripino Cawich (1947–2003), Belizean politician
- Agripino Núñez Collado (1933–2022), Roman Catholic clergyman and scholar from the Dominican Republic

== Middle names ==
- João Agripino da Costa Doria Júnior (born 1957), Brazilian politician
- José Agripino Barnet (1864–1945), former Interim President of Cuba
- José Agripino Maia (born 1945), Brazilian politician
