= 2008 Belizean general election =

- 7 February 2008

All 31 seats in the House of Representatives 16 seats needed for a majority
- Registered: 156,993
- Turnout: 77.18% (▼2.37pp)
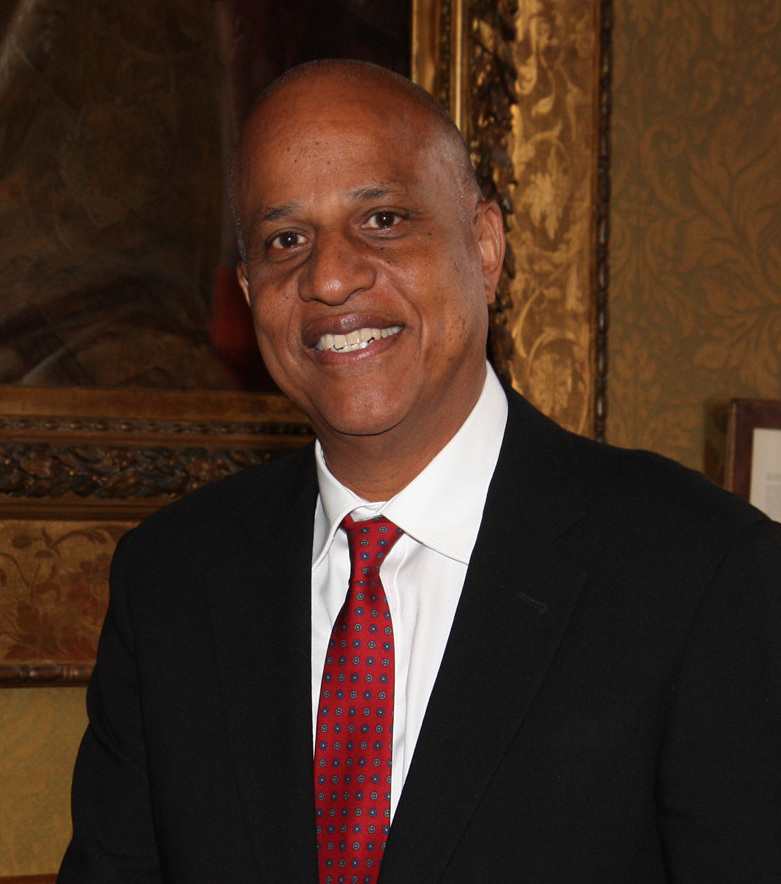

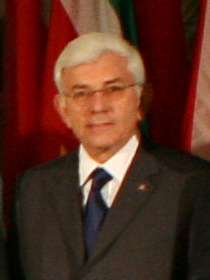
	First party	Second party
Leader	Dean Barrow	Said Musa
Party	UDP	PUP
Leader's seat	Queen's Square	Fort George
Last election	45.19%, 7 seats	53.54%, 22 seats
Seats won	25	6
Seat change	▲18	▼16
Popular vote	66,203	47,624
Percentage	56.61%	40.72%
Swing	▲11.42 pp	▼12.82 pp
- Results by constituency
Prime Minister before election
Said Musa
PUP
Subsequent Prime Minister
Dean Barrow
UDP

General elections were held in Belize on 7 February 2008. Beginning with this election, Belizeans elected 31 members to the House of Representatives of Belize instead of 29. In what was considered an upset, the opposition United Democratic Party (UDP) won the election with 25 out of 31 seats; the ruling People's United Party won six.

The elections were held alongside a constitutional referendum had also been called to determine the views of Belizeans on an elected Senate.

== Background ==
In August 2003 Cayo South Area Rep. Agripino Cawich of the PUP died, triggering a by-election in the constituency, only the second held in Belize since independence. The by-election was won by the UDP's John Saldivar, who had lost to Cawich in the general election earlier in 2003. Saldivar's win flipped the constituency to the UDP column and increased the party's caucus to eight for the remainder of the term.

Beginning in March 2007 and continuing through April 22, Belize's 193 villages held council elections on Sundays of every weekend except for Easter. While the Village Council elections are supposed to be non-partisan, the major parties and independents considered them a litmus test for the general elections. From the very beginning, back and forth charges of inaccurate statistics and party favoritism have stained the elections, with both the blue and the red claiming victory in the majority of contested seats. Press releases from both parties claim victory. The results are detailed below.

_{Results of Village Council elections 2007}

UDP	PUP	Independent
114 (own estimate)	103 (own estimate)	16 (PUP estimate)
74 (PUP estimate)	67 (UDP estimate)	9 (UDP estimate)

Prime Minister Said Musa twice had chances to dissolve the House of Representatives in session, on 16 November 2007 and 19 December 2007; both times he passed. However, Musa committed to calling elections before March 2008, the date when they were last held. With the announcement on Monday, 7 January 2008, the House was dissolved from that date. 93 candidates from six parties were nominated Monday, 21 January 2008 and elections were held on Thursday, 7 February 2008. The date chosen was one day behind Ash Wednesday, February 6; according to local media three elections have been called on an Ash Wednesday during Musa's term, of which he has won two.

== Campaign ==
=== People's United Party ===
Campaigning kicked off in earnest from as early as summer 2007. The ruling PUP have rolled out a number of programs designed to woo the electorate, including the promise of free textbooks for primary school students, improved infrastructure on the deep southside of Belize City and a planned rollout of a health insurance scheme in early 2008. Prime Minister Said Musa spent much of the early summer touring the South and West and continued his tour of the country in September and October. The PUP held a press conference on 7 January 2008 and announced pay increases for soldiers, teachers and public officers to take place after the general election. They released their manifesto "Believe in Belize-The BLUEprint" on January 22.

=== United Democratic Party ===
The United Democratic Party, for its part, concentrated on shoring up support in the districts and fighting fires in the various municipal governments they have controlled since March 2006. Party Leader Dean Barrow has likewise toured much of the country since June. Both parties' journalism machinery have dug up various scandals on either side. The Elections and Boundaries Department have noted an increase in the number of voter transfers between divisions, usually done in July and August.

The UDP released its election manifesto, Imagine the Possibilities: 2008-13, to a cheering crowd of supporters at its party headquarters in Belize City on 16 January 2008.

=== Third party announcements ===
Several third parties participated. Among them are established parties Vision Inspired by the People out of Belmopan and We the People Reform Movement from the North, Cornelius Dueck's National Reform Party and Wil Maheia's People's National Party

Attempts by third parties to unify have largely proven unsuccessful. The Amandala of 18 March 2007 indicated that the PNP and WTP had formed an alliance (later named the National Belizean Alliance (NBA)) and were expected to announce their combined slate soon. The parties wrote joint letters to the Amandala in pre-election issues.

Each party separately nominated candidates: VIP nominated 11 candidates, as did the NRP, and the NBA nominated four.

In the Amandala of Sunday, March 11, former party the National Reality Truth Creation Party returned to the political scene with a full page ad endorsing one Ebony Babb for Queen's Square; the ad also extolled the Christian virtues of the party, led by musician Jorge Ernesto Babb. The ad appealed to all "natural Creole born Belizeans" to support the NRTCP in 2008. Subsequent announcements by the NRTCP in the Amandala include Babb himself as a candidate in Freetown.

In November 2007, the major parties confronted each other over an inflammatory political sign in Belize City; a number of individuals were either arrested or threatened with arrest, including Mayor Zenaida Moya. The incident drew the ire of third parties such as the NBA and VIP and led to the signing of a "gentleman's agreement between all major political parties at the request of the Police Department. Despite the signing of this agreement, reports of continued vandalism of signs and inflammatory television commercials continue to circulate.

=== Campaign issues ===
- Municipal governance: The People's United Party, who were defeated in the 2006 municipal elections by the United Democratic Party, point to their spotty performance in governing the towns, particularly Belize City, Orange Walk and San Ignacio; the UDP claim the PUP has been strangling their resources and falsifying the situation.
- Political reform and corruption: The minor parties have all come forward with strategies designed to prevent the large-scale official corruption they say has taken place under the outgoing administration. These include electing the Senate and empowering it with greater oversight over the House, limiting the term of the prime minister and the House, electing the prime minister directly instead of by appointment, introducing powers of impeachment and recall, and strengthening established institutions and officials to keep them independent of the political hierarchy, among others. Both major parties have adopted bits and pieces of these strategies, but the UDP is not fully convinced of the necessity of an elected Senate.
  - Note: On 19 December 2007, the ruling party issued in its last House meeting for the year a bill for a referendum on the introduction of an elected Senate. Despite the Opposition's pleas for the date to be extended in order to consider as many forms of the elected Senate as possible the resolution passed both the Senate and the House.
- Administration performance: The UDP remains convinced that the ruling PUP have largely abandoned the promises that got them elected in 1998 and 2003, while the PUP point to a number of natural disasters and other emergencies that they say have prevented them from doing a better job. The PUP's view seems borne out by the passage of two hurricanes, Dean which caused 200 m in damages and Felix.

=== Candidates ===
This list represents the nominations received by the Elections and Boundaries Department on Nomination Day, January 21.Bold indicates incumbent.

Constituency	PUP	UDP	VIP	NRP	NBA
Albert	**Mark Espat**	Tom Morrison			
Belize Rural Central	**Ralph Fonseca**	Michael Hutchinson	Harrisford Myers		
Belize Rural North	Earl Perez	Edmond Castro			
Belize Rural South	Merlene Spain	**Manuel Heredia Jr.**		Ernesto Caliz	
Belmopan	Rolando Zetina	**John Saldivar**	Paul Morgan		
Caribbean Shores	**Jose Coye**	Carlos Perdomo			
Cayo Central	**Mario Castellaños**	Rene Montero	Gilroy Requeña	George Boiton Jr.	
Cayo North	Otto Coleman	Salvador Fernandez		Alden McDougal	
Cayo Northeast	Orlando Habet	Elvin Penner		Cornelius Dueck	
Cayo South	Charles Galvez	Ramon Witz	Hubert Enriquez		Richard Smith
Cayo West	Kendall Mendez	**Erwin Contreras**	Martha Hendricks		
Collet	Carolyn Trench-Sandiford	**Patrick Faber**	Patrick Rogers		
Corozal Bay	**Juan Vildo Marin**	Pablo Marin			
Corozal North	**Valdemar Castillo**	Nemencio Acosta			
Corozal Southeast	Florencio Marin Jr.	Servando Samos			
Corozal Southwest	Gregorio Garcia	**Gabriel Martinez**			
Dangriga	Cassian Nunez	Arturo Roches	Quentin Mejia	Denton Castillo	
Fort George	**Said Musa**	Dr. George Gough			
Freetown	**Francis Fonseca**	Michael Peyrefitte			
Lake Independence	**Cordel Hyde**	Vanley Jenkins	"Seagull" Joseph Martinez	Gary Lambey	
Mesopotamia	Austin Waight	**Michael Finnegan**			
Orange Walk Central	**Johnny Briceño**	Rosendo Urbina		Alvaro Espejo	
Orange Walk East	Marco Tulio Mendez	Marcel Cardona		Pabel Torres	
Orange Walk North	**Servulo Baeza**	Gaspar Vega		Hilberto Nah	
Orange Walk South	Jose Mai	Mark Pech		Edwardo Melendez	Salustiano Lizama
Pickstock	**Godfrey Smith**	Wilfred Elrington			
Port Loyola	Oscar Rosado	**Anthony Martinez**	Erwin X (Jones)		
Queen's Square	Anthony Sylvester	**Dean Barrow**			
Stann Creek West	**Rodwell Ferguson**	Melvin Hulse	Mateo Polanco		
Toledo East	**Mike Espat**	Eden Martinez			Wil Maheia
Toledo West	**Marcial Mes**	Juan Coy	Max Cho	Fermin Choc	Dionisio Chuc

Others:

- National Reality Truth Creation Party:
  - Jorge E. Babb, Freetown
  - Ebony Babb, Queen's Square
- Independents
  - Herman Lewis, Toledo East
  - Queen Miller, Belize Rural Central
  - Nazim Juan, Cayo Central

Max Samuels in Belize Rural North, Florencio Marin Senior in Corozal South East, Dave Burgos in Orange Walk East, Ismael Cal in Orange Walk South, Ainslie Leslie in Cayo North and Sylvia Flores in Dangriga are not seeking reelection. All represented the People's United Party in their constituencies.

== Opinion polls ==
The Society for the Promotion of Education and Research (SPEAR) released the results of an opinion poll conducted in conjunction with SJC's Belizean Studies Centre in October 2005. In an election 49% of voters would consider voting for a third party; between the current parties 34.5% said they would vote for the PUP and the rest for the UDP.

As a followup, SPEAR conducted a second poll released on 31 October 2006. When asked who they would vote for, 32% said UDP, 11.8% PUP and 22% a third party. Smaller numbers either said they would not vote at all or declined to say who they would vote for. The nation's largest newspaper, the Amandala, headlined that more than half of Belizeans had rejected the PUP and UDP by either supporting a third party or declining to vote; this notion was soundly rejected by the UDP in particular and resulted in back and forth editorial responses in the Amandala and the UDP's Guardian in November, with the UDP charging that publisher Evan X Hyde was playing into the PUP's hands by supporting third parties openly instead of the UDP, and Amandala reiterating that its policy was of Belizeans First and that neither party had thoroughly considered the welfare of "roots" Belizeans since Independence. In March 2007, the University of Belize and Saint John's College Junior College's Belizean Studies Centre conducted a one-weekend poll of 430 randomly selected persons seeking opinions on the 2008 elections. The poll was supervised by UB Registrar Dr. Roy Young and BSC's Yasmine Andrews. On the question of approval of party leaders, the UDP's Dean Barrow led all contestants with 55.7% approval; sitting prime minister Said Musa scored 14.9%, while independent leaders rated below that. Results by party were similar, with the UDP scoring 55.5%, the PUP 16% and independents scores ranging from 2 to 9%.

== Results ==
Party	Votes	%	Seats	+/–
United Democratic Party	67,037	55.72	25	+18
People's United Party	50,744	42.18	6	–16
National Reform Party	1,039	0.86	0	New
Vision Inspired by the People	874	0.73	0	New
People's National Party	314	0.26	0	New
National Belizean Alliance	192	0.16	0	New
National Reality Truth Creation Party	29	0.02	0	New
Independents	72	0.06	0	0
Total	120,301	100.00	31	+2
Valid votes	120,301	99.28		
Invalid/blank votes	867	0.72		
Total votes	121,168	100.00		
Registered voters/turnout	156,993	77.18		
Source: Elections and Boundaries Department
