= Chakroun =

Chakroun (Arabic: شكرون) is an Arabic surname originating in Lebanon. The name originally derives from Shukr (شكر), an Arabic term denoting thankfulness, gratitude, or acknowledgment by humans.

Chakroun, and similar variants, may also refer to:

- Adel Nasser Shakroun (born 1970), Iraqi footballer
- Alfred Schakron (1961–2012), Belizean businessman of Lebanese origin
- Husseyn Chakroun (born 2004), Lebanese footballer
- Mohammed Nasser Shakroun (born 1984), Iraqi footballer
