= Jane Ellen Usher =

Belizean politician (1917–2018)

Member of the Belize House of Representatives for Pickstock
- In office 21 November 1979 – 4 September 1989
- Preceded by: Adolfo Lizarraga
- Succeeded by: George Cadle Price

President of the Belize Senate
- In office 15 September 1989 – 1 June 1993
- Prime Minister: George Cadle Price
- Preceded by: Doris June Garcia
- Succeeded by: Edward Flowers

Personal details
- Born: Jane Ellen Price; 5 September 1917 Belize City, British Honduras
- Died: 12 December 2018 (aged 101) Belize City, Belize
- Party: People's United Party

Jane Ellen Usher (5 September 1917 – 12 December 2018) was the longest running chief executive officer in Belize. She previously served in the People's United Party as a Cabinet member of Health and Cooperatives, President of the Senate, and member of the House of Representatives. She joined Holy Redeemer Credit Union as a clerk, became its treasurer and has served as its CEO since 1956. Usher was the older sister of the "father of Belize", George Cadle Price. She won both the Distinguished Service Award from the Jamaican Cooperative Credit Union League and the Golden Eagle Award from the Belize Credit Unions League for her service to the credit union movement.

== Biography ==
Jane Ellen Price was born on 5 September 1917, in Belize City, British Honduras to William Cadle Price and Irene Cecelia Escalante. She was one of eleven children including Samuel William Price, John Cecil Price, Anna Cecilia Price, George Cadle Price, Lydia Mary Waight, Alice Margaret Craig, Josephine Delia Balderamos, Irene Elizabeth Canton, Katharine Louise Price and Judy Sybil Price.

On 3 January 1942 Price married Henry Charles Usher and in 1944, when Holy Redeemer Credit Union was established, she began working there as a clerk. In the 1950s she helped to create legislation to create a credit union league. British Honduras Credit Union League was officially formed on 15 June 1956 under the new legislation and Usher was appointed as General Manager and elected to the position of Secretary/Treasurer, a position she has held since. In 2001, Usher was honored with the Golden Eagle Award from the Belize Credit Unions League for outstanding service to the Credit Union Movement. That same year she was also honored by the Belize Business Bureau for her contributions to women's development in business in Belize. In 2012, she received the Distinguished Service Award from the Jamaica Cooperative Credit Union League.

Usher served as a PUP Cabinet Minister of Health and Cooperatives from 1979 to 1984. From 1984 to 1989, she served as a member of the Opposition in the House of Representatives. Then between 15 September 1989 and 1 June 1993, Usher served as the president of the Senate. Usher became director emeritus of the Holy Redeemer Credit Union in 2012. In 2013, Usher was awarded an honorary doctorate from Galen University for her long service to citizens of Belize. She turned 100 in September 2017.

Usher died at age 101 on 12 December 2018 in Belize City. She was given a state funeral on 18 December 2018 at Holy Redeemer Cathedral. Elizabeth Zabaneh is her daughter.
