= List of presidents of the Senate of Belize =

This is a list of presidents of the Senate of Belize. The president of the Senate is either elected from among the appointed members, or from outside the Senate.

Name	Entered office	Left office	Notes
Hon. Ewart W. Francis	12 March 1965	3 October 1974	
Hon. Elito Omar Urbina	8 November 1974	27 July 1979	
Hon. George Osmond Dakers	30 November 1979	21 March 1980	
Hon. William Coffin	23 May 1980	December 1983	
Hon. Gadsby Ramos	24 January 1984	9 November 1984	
Hon. Doris June Garcia	21 December 1984	31 July 1989	
Hon. Jane Ellen Usher	15 September 1989	1 June 1993	
Hon. Edward Flowers	16 July 1993	13 July 1998	
Hon. Elizabeth Zabaneh	12 September 1998	July 2001	
Hon. Sylvia Flores	14 August 2001	4 February 2003	
Hon. Philip Zuniga	4 April 2003	7 January 2008	
Hon. Andrea Gill	14 March 2008	3 February 2012	
Hon. Marco Pech	21 March 2012	September 2015	
Hon. Lee Mark Chang	9 November 2015	21 April 2019	
Hon. Darrell Bradley	26 June 2019	11 December 2020	
Hon. Carolyn Trench-Sandiford	11 December 2020	Incumbent	
