= Eden Martinez =

Belizean politician

Member of the Belize House of Representatives for Toledo East
- In office 7 February 2008 – 7 March 2012
- Preceded by: Michael Espat
- Succeeded by: Michael Espat

Personal details
- Party: United Democratic Party

Peter Eden Martinez is a Belizean politician and member of the United Democratic Party. He served a single term as Area Representative in the House of Representatives from the Toledo East constituency from 2008 to 2012.

== Political career ==
Martinez was first selected as the UDP nominee in Toledo East in 2003 but was defeated by the PUP incumbent, Michael Espat. He defeated Espat in a 2008 rematch.

While in office Martinez served as the Minister of Human Development and Social Transformation in the cabinet of Prime Minister Dean Barrow.

Martinez ran for re-election in 2012, once again against Espat, but was defeated.
