= Marco Pech =

Belizean politician

President of the Belize Senate
- In office 21 March 2012 – September 2015
- Prime Minister: Dean Barrow
- Preceded by: Andrea Gill
- Succeeded by: Lee Mark Chang

Minister of State for Natural Resources

Personal details
- Party: United Democratic Party

Marco Pech is a Belizean politician for the United Democratic Party. In 2010, he was appointed as the Minister of State for Natural Resources.

He was President of the Senate from March 2012 to September 2015.
