= Julius Espat =

Belizean Politician

Julius Espat (born February, 1968) is a Belizean Politician who was born in Belize City. He was first elected as Cayo South area representative on March 7, 2012. and was reelected in November 2015. He is currently the chairman of the Public Accounts Committee (PAC) and represents Cayo South area as the Honorable Julius Espat in the Belize House of Representatives. Julius has recently been chosen to be the Minister Of Infrastructure Development And Housing in Belize on November 13, 2020.

== Early life ==
Julius Espat went to school at St. John's College Sixth form before pursuing further education at the University of San Carlos in Guatemala. He graduated with a degree in architecture and immediately returned home to Belize. In 1993 he opened his own business, Strukture Architects which remains one of the foremost architecture firms in the country. Following his determination to serve his people in a greater capacity, Espat entered the world of politics in 2009 as advisor in the People's United Party, also acting as the Secretary-General and overseeing the affairs of the Secretariat. He has served as Treasurer and Co-Campaign Manager and is currently the Area Representative of Cayo South, which he won in landslide victories in 2012 and 2015. He is the Regional Deputy Party Leader for the West.

Since first elected, Honorable Julius Espat has worked to activate the Public Accounts Committee, which has been dormant since the Independence of Belize on September 21, 1981. All the previous Chairmen of the PAC never held a meeting.

Julius Espat has represented the Cayo South constituency, focusing on assistance and representation in the area.
