= Irkay =

Irkay اركي Erkay
- Municipality
- Location in Lebanon
- Coordinates: 33°28′N 35°25′E
- Grid position: 120/170 L
- Country: Lebanon
- Governorate: South Governorate
- District: Sidon District
- Elevation: 1,132 ft (345 m)
- Time zone: UTC+2 (EET)
  - Summer (DST): UTC+3 (EEST)
- Postal code: 2018
- Area code: 07

Irkay (Arabic إركي, also known as Erkay, Erki) is a municipality located in the South of Lebanon (Al Janub) 11 kilometres southeast of Sidon. It has a population of approximately 5,000 people.

== Geography ==
Irkay is situated in the Al-Janub (Southern) governorate, southeast from the capital, Beirut, and borders two small towns, ‘Izzah in the east and Khzaiz in the west. It is only 36 miles (58 km) from Beirut and only 9 miles (15 km) from Sidon (Saïda), one of the main ports in Lebanon. The town is situated on the Jabal ‘Aamel mountain range which begins from Sidon and stretches throughout the South, making the town’s average altitude 1243 feet (378m) above sea-level. The low population of 4850 people and the vast area of the town resulted in a small population density and hence many houses are scattered at different altitudes within the town region.

The region has beautiful lands overseeing the sea and the mountains that fall under the area of Khannousieh, which was classified by the UN as the olive road where in spring inhabitants has the opportunity to drive this road and camp there and see shiny Olive leafs reflecting the sunlight. Erkay has so much potential in the real estate market and in architecture.

== Agriculture ==
Irkay is well for producing olive oil due to the fertile soil which also helps to grow figs as well as grapes and general produce. One of the major river in the South, Al Zahrani, flows next to Irkay.

== Climate ==
Irkay is known to have a moderate Mediterranean climate with four distinct seasons. Temperatures range from 8 °C (46 °F) in the winter to 35 °C (95 °F) in the summer. The humidity is usually high in the summer and low in the winter. Snow occurs nearly once every couple of years. Climate change is threat for the agricultural side on the landlords of olive groves.

== History ==
In the North of the town, at the cliff of the mountain, lie many mysterious caves which have been deserted for hundreds of years. About ten years ago, people from the town were doing excavation work to build a house, when they found a cave with two old jars inside.

When Irkay was first emerging over 50 years ago, there were severe tensions between the four major families: Nasser, Makki, Taki, and Chakroun. Occasional brawls leading to injuries would take place. At some point of time the Lebanese army interfered to cool down the tensions. The reasons for clashes among Irkay residents to occur were land problems, multi-political beliefs and possibly due to jealousy caused between families. The people in Irkay survived a major starving episode during the first world war. Food was limited, where nearly 20% of the population died from hunger. People started planting their own food in order to survive. The episode was caused by a locust infestation which flooded the entire country. Food became contaminated therefore many caught diseases during that period of time. It was the worst Irkay has ever experienced.

Irkay has also survived through many wars and battles such as the Civil War in 1975 and the Israeli invasion in 1978 and 1982. Both wars lasted until the end of the 20th century. During that time Irkay was occupied by Israeli soldiers, when Israel was in control of the South, and also Irkay was home to many Lebanese militias during the Civil War. In recent history, in July 2006, when the July War began, Irkay was nearly hit by 4 bombs dropped down by Israeli fighter jets and 2 of which landed on ‘Izzah, nearly 1.5 miles (2 km) away from Irkay.

Recently, the mayor proposed raising taxes in order to pay for the maintenance of the roads and the creation of more social activities. In the end the government decided to fund all of this as gratitude for the people.

== Demographics ==
In 2014, Muslims made up 99.70% of registered voters in Irkay. 98.14% of the voters were Shiite Muslims.

=== Religion ===
Irkay residents are mostly Muslims. Athan is raised 5 times a day in the mosque (Al Imam Al Mahdi Masjed) as a calling for all residents to pray. Every Tuesday (El-Tawasull) and Thursday (Kumaill) duaa' is played aloud for residents across the village to participate in prayer. Friday combines both the elderly and youngsters together in such a holy prayer called Salat Al-Jumaa', like many other places.

Religious practices and the socio-political factors have changed over time with an affirmation of religious presence and cultural practices living along with non practicing inhabitants.

== Culture ==
The people in Irkay are known for their continuous cultural activities. Some of these activities include, going down to the river every 3rd week in August and have a picnic where all the residents sing and dance the traditional Lebanese dabke, after enjoying a feast finishing off the traditional Lebanese folklore. Dabke was practiced as well in the main Saha of Erkay before changing its functionality from circular stair like structure, close to the Roman amphitheater, and plenty of Quina trees to a boring roundabout and a tree. Inhabitants used to not only meet for dabke each weekend but used the Saha as a social place and connectivity. The Saha long time ago was used as well as a meeting place for mothers and women to do the laundry. Erkay has its own mayor, elected by the public every four years. His job is to oversee the government projects such as, maintenance, schools, and clinics, he also communicates with the government, on behalf of the people, to tell them about their concerns and needs. Furthermore, there is a reward given by Irkay to the students, in each grade, who achieve the highest marks at the end of each year.

Traditionally all the houses are built from concrete blocks or Stone. They also each have a garden where many residents grow their own vegetables and fruits, which isn't practicef anymore. Traditionally houses were made out of stone and hay-mud mixture following the traditional Lebanese houses that contain the Dar, with a small welcoming terrace for visitors. With the advancement and change of socio-political factors, some of the houses that have a design or aesthetic approach not relatable to the Lebanese culture started to appear. Architect clients wanted to copy paste some of the designs found on Google without really thinking the cultural side. Some families are still preserving the cultural side. Documentation on this matter might be enriching.

The cultural aspect of Erkay has changed over time with flagrant presence of political signs and symbols of Hizbollah and Amal, and the activities that used to be practiced such as dabke changed into Muslim events and mainly practices of grief the dead and similar extreme religious events. The general spirit has transformed which position some of the inhabitants as marginalized, and in constant tension. This has created a clear social segmentation and transformation for the inhabitants by muting independent individuals that doesn't adhere to any of the political parties that exist. With an infiltration of extreme religious bias sometimes dangerous which mutes freedom of opinion and existence of others. Which pushed some to flee the area, or fight their way of what resembles them.

Aside this, inhabitants practice hunting in the area, where they hunt birds and wild pigs to sell them for Christians in the surrounding.

Cultural clashes exist in Erkay, as some got attacked for political reasons, some have faced imposition of religion and Faith.

== Sports ==
The people of Irkay enjoy many sports, such as soccer, basketball and volleyball. Every August a soccer tournament is arranged where teams from different villages are invited to participate. Sometimes even players from the Lebanese National team are invited to attend this tournament. The winning team is awarded a trophy and a cash prize. This tournament is a major source of entertainment to the residents of the South.

== Sources ==
- Chakroun, Nadim, Direct Interview, 6 July 2012.
- Chakroun, Rami, Direct Interview, 24 June 2013.
- Egger, Per. "Irkay, Lebanon Page." Directory of Cities and Towns in Mohafazat Liban-Sud, Lebanon. 1996-2004. Falling Rain Genomics, Inc. 5 Sept. 2008
