= Lee Mark Chang =

Belizean politician and restaurateur

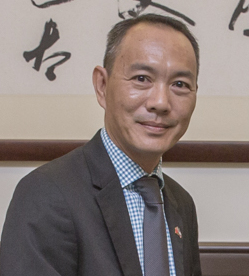
- Chang in 2018

Member of the Belize House of Representatives for Mesopotamia
- Incumbent
- Assumed office 12 March 2025
- Preceded by: Shyne Barrow

President of the Belize Senate
- In office 9 November 2015 – 21 April 2019
- Prime Minister: Dean Barrow
- Preceded by: Marco Pech
- Succeeded by: Darrell Bradley

Personal details
- Party: United Democratic Party

Lee Mark Chang
- Traditional Chinese: 鄭經緯
- Simplified Chinese: 郑经纬
Transcriptions
Standard Mandarin
- Hanyu Pinyin: Zhèng Jīngwěi

Lee Mark Chang is a Belizean politician and restaurateur. A member of the United Democratic Party, he was the first ethnic Chinese person to hold the post of President of the Senate of Belize.

== Early life and career ==
Chang got his start in life working at the Chon Saan Palace restaurant which his father Armando opened in 1974. Under his management, he grew it from a small family restaurant to a chain with three locations and fifty staff, making it "one of the biggest names in restaurants" in the country. He also became the president of the Chinese Association of Belize. Under his tenure as president, the CAB worked closely with the Belize Police Department on issues of crime prevention, and also donated several motorcycles. He also served in a variety of public positions, for example sitting on the Belize District Liquor Licensing board and working as an occasional court translator.

=== In politics ===
Chang first announced his intention to join electoral politics in August 2009. In August 2010, PM Dean Barrow appointed Chang to the Senate and made him acting president, to fill in for Andrea Gill who was on maternity leave. Politicians from both sides of the aisle such as the PUP's Lisa Shoman offered congratulations to him on what they described as "the epitome of Belize's cultural diversity" and an "important milestone" for Belize's Chinese community.

Chang entered the 2012 "double election" as the UDP's National Assembly candidate for the Freetown constituency. In the run-up to the election, an unknown person released a forged letter claiming to be from Chang, promising to distribute land in Belama to the Belize Chinese Association in exchange for campaign contributions. The Belize Times also published a number of racist comments about him. Lee lost the election to PUP party leader Francis Fonseca by 1,558 to 1,408 votes. In early April Chang filed a motion for an election petition in April, alleging that Fonseca's agents engaged in bribery of the electorate. Chief Justice Kenneth Benjamin granted him leave to bring the petition; it was the first election petition in Belize's history to be granted on the grounds of bribery.

In November 2015, Chang became the President of the Senate, after the United Democratic Party won their 3rd term.

== Personal life ==
Chang's parents are Chinese immigrants. He was born at the former Holden Memorial Hospital on the Marine Parade in Belize City.
