= National Reality Truth Creation Party =

Political party in Belize

The National Reality Truth Creation Party was a minor political party in Belize. It contested the 1998 and 2008 elections but failed to win a seat in either.

The party appears to be a pet project of Jorge Ernesto "Prophet" Babb and Ebony Babb, which ran exclusively in Belize City. Jorge ran in Lake Independence in 1998 and Freetown in 2008, while Ebony ran in Queen's Square in 2008. Jorge's 19 votes in Freetown in 2008 (0.69%) constituted the party's high water mark.
