= National Belizean Alliance =

Political alliance in Belize

The National Belizean Alliance was a group of third parties contesting the 2008 general elections in Belize.

== Formation ==
The NBA was formed in October 2007 in Belize City between the We the People Reform Movement (WTP), People's National Party (PNP), and a group from Cayo called Christians Pursuing Reform. Since then it has released several statements criticizing the ruling People's United Party (PUP).

== Leaders ==
- Wil Maheia, Dionisio Choc (PNP)
- Hipolito Bautista (WTP)
- Richard Smith (CPR)

== See also ==
- We the People Reform Movement
- People's National Party
