= Simeon López =

Belizean Politician

Mayor of Belmopan, Belize
- In office 1 March 2006 – 4 March 2015
- Preceded by: Anthony Chanona
- Succeeded by: Khalid Belisle

Personal details
- Party: United Democratic Party

Simeon López is a former mayor of Belmopan, the capital of Belize. He is a member of the United Democratic Party (UDP); in 2006, he was elected as mayor, and also became vice president of the Belize Mayors' Association. Marconi Sosa, Benque Viejo del Carmen's mayor, succeeded him as that organization's vice president in 2007.

López was succeeded as Belmopan mayor in 2015 by Khalid Belisle, also of the UDP.
