= Andrea Gill (politician) =

Former president of the Senate of Belize

President of the Belize Senate
- In office 14 March 2008 – 3 February 2012
- Prime Minister: Dean Barrow
- Preceded by: Philip Zuniga
- Succeeded by: Marco Pech

Personal details
- Party: United Democratic Party (Belize)

Andrea Gill is the former president of the Senate of Belize. She served from 2008 to 2012. Between 2008 and 2009, she served as president of the Forum of Presiding Officers of National Parliaments of Central America and the Caribbean (FOPREL).

== Biography ==
Gill holds a Bachelor of Science degree in Biology. As part of a manatee research project, Gill was involved between 1997 and 2001 in a manatee tagging project which focused on the Southern Lagoon. She then became a teacher focusing on improving education systems.

She served as President of the Senate of Belize from 14 March 2008 to 3 February 2012 when she was replaced by Marco Pech. In November 2008, she assumed the presidency of the Forum of Presiding Officers of National Parliaments of Central America and the Caribbean (FOPREL), the first time Belize had participated in the regional body. On 12 June 2009, Gill was awarded the Golden Medal of Honour from the Legislative Assembly of the Republic of Nicaragua in recognition of her work to promote democracy and integration in the region. On 1 March 2010, Gill passed leadership of FOPREL to President of the National Assembly of Honduras, Congressman Juan Orlando Hernández Alvarado.
