= Cordel Hyde =

Belizean politician

The Honourable Cordel Hyde
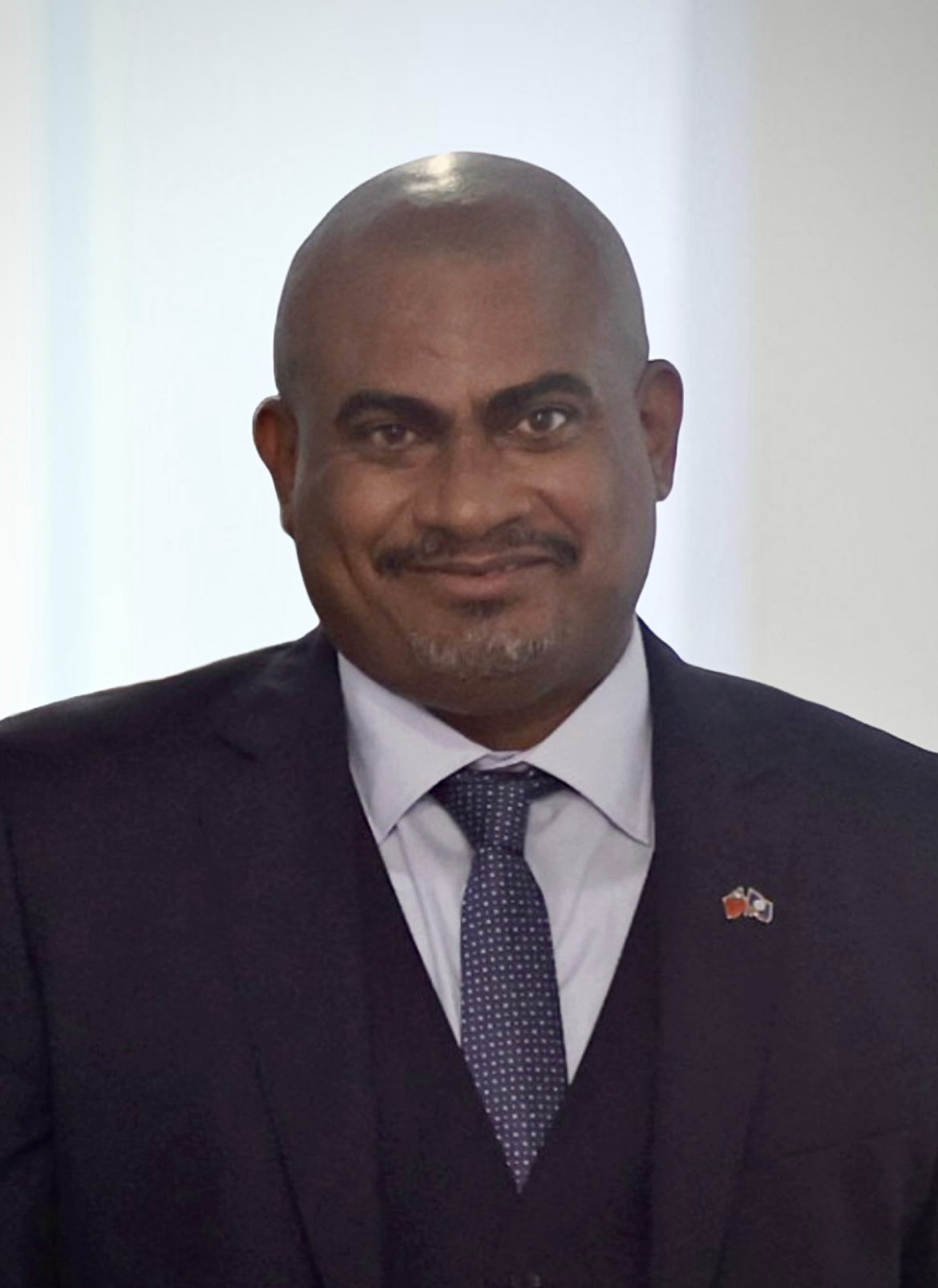
- Hyde in 2024

9th Deputy Prime Minister of Belize
- Incumbent
- Assumed office 13 November 2020
- Prime Minister: Johnny Briceño
- Preceded by: Hugo Patt

Member of the Belize House of Representatives for Lake Independence
- Incumbent
- Assumed office 4 November 2015
- Preceded by: Mark King

Member of the Belize House of Representatives for Lake Independence
- In office 28 August 1998 – 8 February 2008
- Preceded by: Hubert Elrington
- Succeeded by: Mark King

Personal details
- Born: 20 August 1973 (age 53)
- Party: People's United Party
- Children: 9
- Education: St. John's College; Le Moyne College

Cordel Hyde (born 20 August 1973) is a Belizean politician. He is the current Deputy Prime Minister of Belize since 16 November 2020. He is a member of the People's United Party and has represented the Lake Independence constituency in the Belize House of Representatives since 2015. He currently serves as the Deputy Leader of the People's United Party.

== Early life and education ==
Hyde was born in Belize City and is the son of prominent Belizean media executive Evan X Hyde and professional Belizean baker Claudette Courtney née Coleman.

Hyde is an alumnus of St. John's College, a junior college in Belize City. He went on to receive a bachelor's degree in English communications from a university in Upstate New York.

== Career ==
Upon completing his university studies, Hyde returned to Belize and entered politics. He won his first elections in 1998, becoming the Area Representative for Lake independence. Hyde was appointed various ministries during the two-term administration under Prime Minister Said Musa, including Education, Youth, Sports, Housing, Transport, and Defense.

Hyde continued to serve the people of his constituency until 2012, when his son was diagnosed with cancer. His son died later that year in New York. Hyde returned to Belize to work for his family's business.

In 2014, Hyde announced his return to politics, defeating the incumbent in the 2015 elections and reclaiming his old seat.

After the overwhelming victory of the People's United Party in the 2020 elections, Hyde was appointed the Deputy Prime Minister of Belize. He also oversees the Ministry of Natural Resources, Petroleum & Mining.
