= Toledo Progressive Party =

1970s and 1980s Belizean political party

The Toledo Progressive Party (TPP) was a minor political party in the Toledo District of southern Belize, active in the late 1970s and 1980s. The main leader of the party was Alejandro Vernon. The party had limited popular support, and was largely perceived as representing Guatemalan interests in the territorial dispute between the two countries. The party addressed two sessions of the United Nations General Assembly Fourth Committee, arguing in favour of Guatemalan positions. It contested the 1979 elections, gathering around 4% of the vote in the Toledo constituencies.

== Founding of TPP ==
The party was co-founded by Alejandro Vernon and Anthony Martinez in 1976. Vernon was a businessman, former mayor of Punta Gorda and former parliamentarian who had resigned from the People's United Party (PUP) in May 1976, arguing that the PUP government was "causing Belize to become embroiled in a war which would take place on Belizean soil and lead us into desolation, poverty and a permanent state of siege". Vernon served as the secretary-general of the party. Anthony Martinez, a Garifuna, became the chairman of the TPP.

The party was described as having been founded by the Guatemalan government. The TPP was generally seen as supporting ceding parts of Toledo District to Guatemala, although party documents avoided making explicit commentaries in favour of union with Guatemala. The party's documents argued that in the light of Guatemalan's military threats, declaring Belize independent posed a risk for war. The Belizean government rebuffed the TPP as a political farce. In response to TPP and Vernon's positions the Premier of Belize George Cadle Price undertook a tour of Toledo District, denouncing the idea of ceding territory to Guatemala as traitorous.

The TPP party office was located in the centre of Punta Gorda. The TPP generally had a weak organisational structure, although Vernon would make grand claims of the party having over 5,000 members. The party reportedly had support from some Punta Gorda businessmen, but little support from the wider populace.

== At the United Nations ==
The party was accused of being financed by the Guatemalan government. The TPP participated in the 1977 and 1978 sessions of the United Nations General Assembly Fourth Committee, with the delegations being accused of having the trips paid for by the Guatemalan government. The 1977 TPP delegation consisted of Vernon and Martinez, whilst at the 1978 session they were also joined by Cirilo Caliz (vice-president of the Maya-Kekchi movement of Toledo, who allegedly had been prevented by the Belizean government from attending the 1977 session). In Vernon's speech at the 1978 session (which was reportedly later circulated in print by the Guatemalan Ministry of Foreign Affairs) he stated that the population of the Belize–Guatemalan border shared the same language and culture and that Belizean independence should be put on hold until the border issue was solved and the economic situation improved.

== Electoral failures ==
The TPP contested the 1978 municipal elections in Toledo District, without much success. The TPP contested the 1979 general elections, but received just 96 votes and failed to win any seat. Vernon contested the Toledo North seat, obtaining 46 votes (4%) and Cecil Casimiro contested the Toledo South seat, obtaining 50 votes (3.9%). According to the Economist Intelligence Unit, the meagre result for TPP candidates reaffirmed a broad rejection in Belize against the Guatemalan territorial aspirations.

== 1983 TPP convention ==
The 28 August 1983 TPP convention attended by some 200 delegates adopted a resolution calling on the Belizean government to "sincerely explore the possibility of a settlement of the territorial dispute [with Guatemala], by negotiation." A seven-member executive was elected consisting of Vernon (82 votes), Ana de Avila (74 votes), Casimiro (63 votes), John Sanchez (59 votes), Mauricio Roches (58 votes), Josephine Arana (43 votes) and John Grinage (43 votes). Candidates William Usher (39 votes) and Erminio Noralez (32 votes) failed to secure a seat in the TPP Executive. Casimiro would serve as the vice-president of the party. Ana de Avila, a Catholic lay-minister, served as the TPP Officer.

== 1984 elections and later years ==
The party supported the United Democratic Party (UDP) in the 1984 general elections. As of 1984 there were also reports in the Guatemalan press that Vernon planned to contest upcoming Guatemalan general elections as a candidate from the '23rd Department' (the Guatemalan government designation of Belize during the territorial dispute). By 1985 reportedly the party was largely defunct. By the time of the 1989 general election Vernon was back in the PUP fold.
