= Wayne Pai =

Taiwanese businessman (1952-2008)

- 白文正
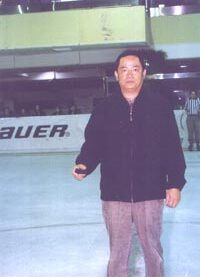
- Born: Pai Wen-cheng; 14 October 1952; Penghu, Taiwan
- Died: 2 July 2008 (aged 55); Penghu, Taiwan
- Education: National Chiao Tung University
- Occupation: businessman

Wayne Pai (Chinese: 白文正; pinyin: Pai Wencheng; 14 October 1952 – July 2008) was a Taiwanese businessman.

Pai founded the Polaris Group (寶來集團), the second largest securities brokerage of Taiwan, and served as the chairman of the company. Pai was considered a successful businessperson, but was entangled in multiple scandals prior to his death. He disappeared in Penghu since 2 July 2008. The police found Pai's body and confirmed his death by suicide on the morning of 4 July 2008.
