= Carolyn Trench-Sandiford =

Belizean urban planner and politician

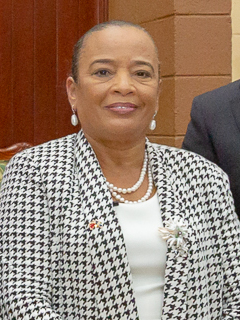
- Trench-Sandiford in 2023

President of the Belize Senate
- Incumbent
- Assumed office 11 December 2020
- Prime Minister: Johnny Briceño
- Preceded by: Darrell Bradley

Personal details
- Born: 1962 (age 63–64) Belize City, Belize
- Party: People's United Party
- Education: University of Technology, Jamaica; University of London

Carolyn Trench-Sandiford (born 1962) is a Belizean urban planner and politician who has served as the president of the Senate since December 2020. She is a member of the People's United Party.

== Education ==
Trench-Sandiford was born in Belize City. She studied Physical Planning and Environmental Resource Management at the University of Technology, Jamaica and Law at the University of London. She undertook a Masters in Environmental Law and Management at Aberystwyth University in Wales with a scholarship from the Protected Areas Conservation Trust.

== Career ==
Trench-Sandiford is an urban planner and is CEO of her own firm. She served as President of the Belize Planners Association from 2016 until December 2020. She was co-convenor of the Caribbean Planners Association, was recognised as a United Nations global evaluation expert and was named by The Planner as one of its "Women of Influence" in 2018.

Trench-Sandiford was known as a "social advocate, speaking out for the constitutional rights of vulnerable and marginalized groupings of people and communities. and on domestic violence. On the anniversaries of Belize's independence in 2014 and 2016, she published articles called "Quo Vadis Belize? Where are we going Belize?" outlining her understanding of the country's needs to move forward.

=== Political career ===
Trench-Sandford is a member of the People's United Party and served as party chair from 2010 as well as one of its Deputy Leaders for a time. In 2006 she was nominated as a candidate for the party in both the Collet Division and Belize City Council. She was defeated by the UDP's Patrick Faber in both the 2008 and 2012 general elections.

Trench-Sandiford was selected and sworn in as President of the Senate on 11 December 2020. She was re-elected for a second term in April 2025.

== Personal life ==
Trench-Sandiford is a Christian.
