= Agripino Cawich =

Belizean politician

Member of the Belize House of Representatives for Cayo South
- In office 27 August 1998 – 8 August 2003
- Preceded by: Sam Waight
- Succeeded by: John Saldivar

Personal details
- Born: c. 1947 San Narciso, Corozal, British Honduras
- Died: 8 August 2003 (aged 56) Little Rock, Arkansas, United States
- Party: People's United Party
- Spouse: Anna Gloria Ramirez Cawich
- Children: 3
- Education: Escuela Agricola Panamericana; University of Florida; University of Arizona

Agripino "Pino" Cawich (c. 1947 – 8 August 2003) was a Belizean politician who served as an Area Representative in the Belize House of Representatives from 1998 until his death in 2003. Cawich represented the Cayo South constituency as a member of the People's United Party.

== Electoral history ==
A resident of the Belizean capital city of Belmopan, Cawich was an agricultural expert who worked extensively with the Belizean sugar industry. He was elected to the Belize House in 1998 and 2003 elections, both times defeating John Saldivar of the United Democratic Party. While in office he served as Minister of State.

Saldivar won the by-election held after Cawich's death, defeating Agripino's son Pablo Joaquin Cawich.

== Death ==
Cawich died on 8 August 2003 at the UAMS Medical Center in Little Rock, Arkansas, where he was being treated for cancer. His remains were returned to Belize where Agripino was given a state funeral. Cawich is interred in the Belmopan Cemetery.
