= Darrell Bradley =

Belizean attorney and politician

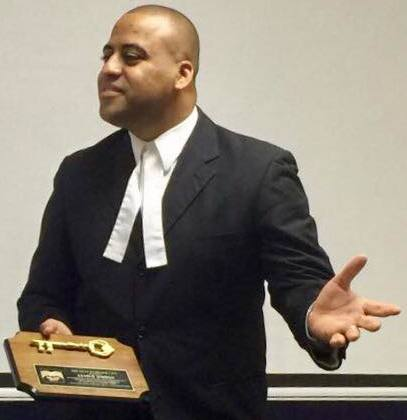
- Bradley in 2017

President of the Belize Senate
- In office 26 June 2019 – 11 December 2020
- Prime Minister: Dean Barrow
- Preceded by: Lee Mark Chang
- Succeeded by: Carolyn Trench-Sandiford

Mayor of Belize City
- In office 7 March 2012 – 9 March 2018
- Preceded by: Zenaida Moya
- Succeeded by: Bernard Wagner

Personal details
- Born: 1978 (age 47–48) Belize
- Party: United Democratic Party
- Spouse: Julie-Ann Ellis Bradley
- Education: Saint Louis University; University of the West Indies
- Profession: Attorney

Darrell Bradley (born 1978) is a Belizean attorney and politician who served as Mayor of Belize City from 2012 to 2018, and as President of the Senate from 2019 to 2020. He is a member of the United Democratic Party (UDP).

== Early life and education ==
Darrell Bradley was born in 1978. He graduated from Saint Louis University with a Bachelor of Arts degree in sociology and international studies and a Master of Arts degree in public administration. He graduated from the University of the West Indies with a Bachelor of Law degree and later worked there as a lecturer. He was admitted to the bar in Belize on 11 October 2007.

== Career ==
From 2011 to 2012, Bradley was vice president of the Belize Bar Association. From 2008 to 2012, Bradley was a member of the board of directors of the Central Bank of Belize.

Prior to Bradley's mayoral run, he served as youth director for the United Democratic Party. Bradley was elected mayor of Belize City in 2012 and was re-elected in 2015.

In August 2017, Bradley announced he would not run for re-election as mayor of Belize City in 2018 but would remain active in politics. He was succeeded as mayor by Bernard Wagner.

Bradley was the UDP nominee for the House of Representatives in the Caribbean Shores constituency at the 2015 general election, however, he lost to the PUP candidate Kareem Musa. He was appointed President of the Senate on 26 June 2019, serving until 11 December 2020. He indicated he would run for the leadership of the UDP to replace Patrick Faber in 2020.

== Personal life ==
Bradley married Julie-Ann Ellis, with whom he had two children.
