= 2009 Belizean municipal elections =

A municipal election was held in Belize on 4 March 2009. Voters elected sixty seven representatives, eighteen in city councils (11 Belize City, 7 Belmopan) and forty nine in town councils.

== Participating parties ==
- United Democratic Party (incumbents)
- People's United Party
- Vision Inspired by the People (Belmopan only)
- Benque Association (Benque Viejo only)
- People's National Party (Punta Gorda only)
- Congress of the P.G. People (Punta Gorda only)

=== Belize City ===
Mayor of Belize City Zenaida Moya will seek reelection after fighting off a challenge by Councillor Anthony Michael. She will be challenged by retired public officer Dr. Cecil Reneau.

=== Belmopan ===
Simeon Lopez, sitting mayor, won a local convention on August 17, defeating younger challengers Khalid Belisle and subordinate Eugene Brown. He will be challenged by the PUP's Rosalind Casey.

=== Towns ===
The slates for all district towns have been selected.

=== Schedule ===
- February 4: Announcement of polls and nomination date.
- February 9: Presentation of PUP municipal manifestos
- February 16: Candidates for municipal councils formally nominated at local election office.
- February: Presentation of UDP municipal manifestos
- March 4:
  - 7:00 A.M., opening of polls
  - 6:00 P.M., close of polls;
  - 8:00 P.M., counting of votes begins.
- March 5: Earliest date each council can be formally sworn into office.

== Voter turnout ==
- Belize City: 36.8%
- Belmopan: 46.84%
- San Pedro: 61.04%
- Corozal: 52.81%
- Orange Walk: 72.90%
- San Ignacio/Santa Elena: 54.22%
- Benque Viejo: 71.49%
- Dangriga: 41.97%
- Punta Gorda: 58.43%

== Final results ==
=== Corozal Town ===
Candidates	Office Sought	Votes Polled/%	Elected
Hilberto Enrique Campos	Mayor (UDP)	2145 (31.87%)	elected
Aaron Ubaldo Babb	Councilor (UDP)	2373 (35.26%)	elected
Jude Stanley Budna	Councilor (UDP)	2367 (35.17%)	elected
Willie Joselle Cruz	Councilor (UDP)	2362 (35.10%)	elected
Abigail Karina Gomez	Councilor (UDP)	2311 (34.34%)	elected
Kenisha Yvonne Esquivel	Councilor (UDP)	2302 (34.21%)	elected
Nonita Encarnacion Ramirez	Councilor (UDP)	2306 (34.26%)	elected
Ivan J. Castillo	Mayor (PUP)	1739 (25.84%)	
Rosa Casanova	Councilor (PUP)	1716 (25.50%)	
Miriam Gilharry Gomez	Councilor (UDP)	1725 (25.63%)	
Raul Altamira Mai	Councilor (PUP)	1759 (26.14%)	
Arcenio Vasquez	Councilor (PUP)	1716 (25.50%)	
Miguel Ricalde	Councilor (PUP)	1799 (26.73%)	
Tulio Rodriguez	Councilor (PUP)	1720 (25.56%)	
Edward "Head" Henderson	Mayor (Independent)	112 (1.66%)	

=== Orange Walk Town ===
Candidates	Office Sought	Votes Polled/%	Elected
Phillip Marvin de la Fuente	Mayor (UDP)	3538 (35.60%)	elected
Raul "Splash" Alcoser	Councilor (UDP)	3452 (34.74%)	
David Israel Constanza	Councilor (UDP)	3551 (35.73%)	elected
Eduardo Eustacio Leiva	Councilor (UDP)	3435 (34.56%)	
Joel Enrique Madera	Councilor (UDP)	3494 (35.16%)	elected
Xenia Enid Morales	Councilor (UDP)	3553 (35.75%)	elected
Carlos Andres Perera	Councilor (UDP)	3355 (33.76%)	
Ramon "Monchi" Cervantes	Mayor (PUP)	3392 (34.13%)	
Rozel Arana Flores	Councilor (PUP)	3545 (35.67%)	elected
Rafael Avila	Councilor (PUP)	3463 (34.85%)	
Kevin Bernard	Councilor (PUP)	3499 (35.21%)	elected
Josue Carballo	Councilor (PUP)	3531 (35.53%)	elected
Alexander Lopez	Councilor (PUP)	3415 (34.36%)	
Faride Riverol	Councilor (PUP)	3434 (34.55%)	

=== San Ignacio/Santa Elena ===
Candidates	Office Sought	Votes Polled/%	Elected
John Francis August, Jr.	Mayor (UDP)	2706 (26.77%)	elected
Eduardo Cano	Councilor (UDP)	3426 (33.89%)	elected
Orlando Moses Chuc	Councilor (UDP)	3540 (35.02%)	elected
Bernadette Fernandez	Councilor (UDP)	3705 (36.65%)	elected
Desol D. Neal	Councilor (UDP)	3502 (34.64%)	elected
Vanessa Jeaneane Neal	Councilor (UDP)	3595 (35.56%)	elected
A. Earl Trapp	Councilor (UDP)	3664 (36.24%)	elected
Jose Hermilio "Mendee" Mendoza	Mayor (PUP)	1061 (10.50%)	
Nasim Elias Lisbey	Councilor (PUP)	1448 (14.32%)	
Gabriel Jorge "Benjy" Maldonado	Councilor (PUP)	1378 (13.63%)	
Jose Vicente "Joe Marr" Marr, Sr.	Councilor (PUP)	1471 (14.55%)	
Marleni Celene "Guerra" Torres	Councilor (PUP)	1347 (13.32%)	
Yolla Asme "Yolla Flores" Vasquez	Councilor (PUP)	1339 13.25%	
Luis Amett "Cal" Zaiden	Councilor (PUP)	1367 (13.52%)	
Luis Ayala	Mayor (Independent)	137 (1.36%)	
Alfonso "Poncho" Cruz	Mayor (Independent)	1312 (12.98%)	

=== Benque Viejo del Carmen Town ===
Candidates	Office Sought	Votes Polled/%	Elected
Nicholasito Russel "Nick" Ruiz	Mayor (UDP)	1813 (47.03%)	elected
Ana Melita Castellanos	Councilor (UDP)	1687 (43.76%)	elected
Constance Frances "Concie" Hyde	Councilor (UDP)	1684 (43.68%)	elected
Salvador Jorge Iglesias	Councilor (UDP)	1838 (47.68%)	elected
Marcos Moises "Checha" Kotch	Councilor (UDP)	1747 (45.32%)	elected
Eric Raul Manzanero	Councilor (UDP)	1726 (44.77%)	elected
Miguel Angel "Mike" Velasquez	Councilor (UDP)	1784 (46.28%)	elected
Shelly Hernandez Pacheco	Mayor (PUP)	539 (13.98%)	
Irma Araceli Garcia	Councilor (PUP)	540 (14.01%)	
Kenny Giovani Luna	Councilor (PUP)	568 (14.73%)	
Francisco Manuel "Moya" Portillo	Councilor (PUP)	585 (15.18%)	
Luis Enrique "Kike" Quiroz	Councilor (PUP)	578 (14.99%)	
Jose Luis "Wicho" Rodriguez	Councilor (PUP)	547 (14.19%)	
Daisy Yacab Magana	Councilor (PUP)	558 (14.47%)	
Humberto Moh	Mayor (Benque Association)	56 (1.45%)	
Asmin Betancourt	Councilor (Benque Association)	66 (1.71%)	
Eric Walter Billalta	Councilor (Benque Association)	50 (1.30%)	
Elmer Galvez	Councilor (Benque Association)	48 (1.25%)	
Carlos Manuel Gomez	Councilor (Benque Association)	57 (1.48%)	
Jose Eduardo Gongora	Councilor (Benque Association)	53 (1.37%)	
Martin Ricardo Mendez	Councilor (Benque Association)	45 (1.17%)	

== Media coverage ==
- LOVE FM, Channel 5: Decision 2009
- KREM FM, Krem Television, Channel 7: The Big Test 2009
- WAVE Radio, BBN: Election Watch 2009
- Plus Television (Belmopan), Integrity Radio (Belize City): unknown
- Live Election Results and pictures on www.orangewalk.net by FarWorld Tech of Orange Walk Town, Belize.
