= John Saldivar (politician) =

Belizean politician

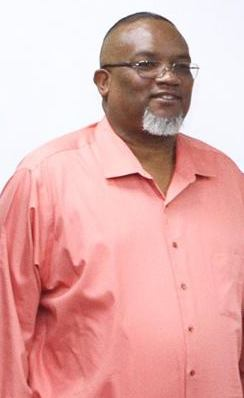
- Saldivar in 2016

Member of the Belize House of Representatives for Belmopan
- In office 7 February 2008 – 12 November 2020
- Preceded by: (constituency created)
- Succeeded by: Oscar Mira

Member of the Belize House of Representatives for Cayo South
- In office 29 October 2003 – 7 February 2008
- Preceded by: Agripino Cawich
- Succeeded by: Ramon Witz

Personal details
- Party: United Democratic Party

John Birchman Saldivar is a Belizean politician. A member of the United Democratic Party, Saldivar has represented the Belmopan constituency in the Belize House of Representatives from its creation in 2008 until his defeat in the 2020 general election. He was previously Area Representative for Cayo South.

On January 20, 2023, he was sanctioned by the United States Department of State citing corruption.

== Electoral history ==
A resident of Belmopan, Saldivar was the UDP standard bearer for Cayo South in the 1998 and 2003 elections, but was defeated both times by Agripino Cawich of the People's United Party. He was elected to the seat in the by-election triggered by Cawich's death in August 2003, defeating Cawich's son Joaquin.

In 2008 the city of Belmopan was redistricted out of Cayo South and given its own constituency. Saldivar contested that seat instead, defeating the PUP's Rolando Zetina. He was re-elected in 2012, defeating former PUP Area Rep. Amin Hegar.

Saldivar served as the Minister of Public Service and Government Improvement from 2008 to 2012 in Belize. From 2012 until February 2020, Saldivar served as the Minister of National Security.

Saldivar stood as a candidate for UDP party leader in a convention on 9 February 2020 to replace the longtime incumbent, Prime Minister Dean Barrow, who retired from party politics. He defeated Deputy Prime Minister Patrick Faber, but three days later was forced to resign after allegations surfaced he accepted US$50,000 from accused fraudster Lev Dermen, who was on trial in Salt Lake City, leaving the future of UDP leadership unclear. Although he remains a UDP member and in the Belize House, Saldivar was also stripped of his Cabinet post.
