= Zenaida Moya =

Belizean mayor

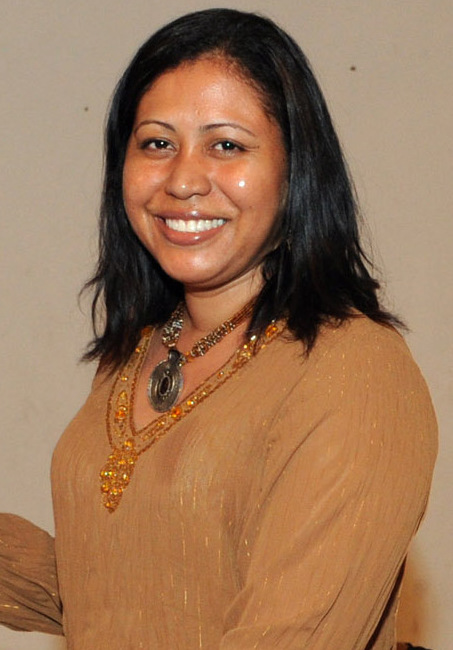
- Moya in 2010

Mayor of Belize City
- In office 1 March 2006 – 7 March 2012
- Preceded by: David Fonseca
- Succeeded by: Darrell Bradley

Personal details
- Party: United Democratic Party
- Education: Gonzaga University; University of Detroit-Mercy

Zenaida Victoria Moya is a former mayor of Belize City, Belize, first elected in elections held in March 2006. She is a former member of the United Democratic Party (UDP). Moya was Belize City's first female mayor.

== Childhood and education ==
Moya was born to a large family headed by Erlean and Eugene Moya, Sr. and has lived all her life in Belize City. She attended local schools in Belize, including Pallotti High School and St. John's College, Junior College, before leaving for Spokane, Washington to attend Gonzaga University, where she earned a B.Sc. in Business Administration, with an Economics concentration. Further studies at University of Detroit-Mercy, in Detroit, Michigan, led to a Master's in this area.

== In government service ==
Moya joined the local Social Security Board in 1995 under a UDP administration, and later the Ministry of Economic Development, working in both cases as an economist. With the accession of the PUP to power in 1998, Moya was moved up to Registrar of Cooperatives and Credit Unions in 2002. By October 2004, she was facing a transfer to a different Ministry in the wake of conflicts with the Northern Fishermen's Cooperative over questionable practices and ignorance of her department's directives. The NFC reputedly was controlled by a relative of Prime Minister Said Musa.

Moya was named supervisor of credit unions and went on vacation leave. In December 2004 she was asked to submit recommendations for the 2005-2006 budget. When Musa presented the budget in January 2006, it led to another round of protests in which Moya was directly involved.

== Involvement in national protests ==
Moya, an officer in the National Trade Union Congress of Belize (NTUCB), participated in the January 2005 strikes and shutdowns precipitated by the Musa budget. She faced criticism from some of her own Association of Public Service Senior Managers(APSSM) members for speaking out against the Musa People's United Party (PUP) administration, and general disapproval from supporters of the PUP. She transferred again to head the Public Sector Investment program, Ministry of National Development. But after another round of protests in April directed at the telecom industry, Moya briefly faced termination from her post. Directed to appear before the Public Services Commission later that summer to explain her actions, Moya, accompanied by lawyer and Leader of the Opposition Dean Barrow and Public Service Union of Belize president Dylan Reneau (Moya had been ostracized from the APSSM and moved to the PSU), denied that her actions in any way violated rules and regulations governing the public service. Moya was cleared and moved on-to local politics.

== Candidacy for Mayor ==
On September 28, 2005, Moya joined a crowded UDP field of candidates for Mayor and Councillor for elections scheduled for March 2006. Moya won the hotly contested convention at the Anglican Cathedral College school grounds in Belize City on October 23, 2005. From the start, Moya's opponents questioned her political experience, particularly in light of the events of 2005. On March 1, 2006 she led the UDP slate to a victory over the incumbent PUP side.

== As Mayor ==
Moya settled into her mayoral duties eagerly, traveling across the world as a representative of Belize City and taking some unpopular stands at home over sanitation control and tourism benefits. Critics continued to carp about her inexperience and dependence on the UDP hierarchy in her first year of office.

== Re-election ==
Moya ran for a second term in municipal elections on March 4, 2009, and was re-elected with a full slate of UDP Councilors. She was sworn in for her second term on March 11, 2009. Moya was not a candidate for re-election in 2012.

Moya expressed interest in becoming the UDP standard bearer in the Mesopotamia constituency at the 2015 general election should incumbent Area Rep. Michael Finnegan stand down. Finnegan ran for re-election. Moya has long been considered a political protege of Finnegan's.
