= People's National Party (Belize) =

- Leader: Wil Maheia
- Founded: 19 February 2007
- Dissolved: 30 September 2015
- Merged into: Belize Progressive Party
- Headquarters: 57 Main St., Punta Gorda, Belize
- Colours: Green, Yellow, & White

Website
- www.pnpbelize.org

The People's National Party of Belize was a political movement headquartered in Punta Gorda, Toledo District, Belize. Operating primarily in southern Belize, the party fielded candidates in the 2008 and 2012 general elections. It held its first meeting on Monday, 19 February 2007 in San Antonio Village, Toledo District.

In September 2015 the party merged with elements of Vision Inspired by the People and other opposition political groups to form the Belize Progressive Party.

== Background ==
The party leader was Wil Maheia, who is a consultant in farming, tourism and the environment. Maheia stood in the Toledo East constituency in the 2008 and 2012 elections. The PNP ran seven candidates in 2012, but failed to crack six percent of the vote in any race.

Maheia also led PNP slates in municipal elections in Punta Gorda, most recently in March 2015. Maheia became the deputy leader of the BPP upon its founding.

== Ideology ==
The PNP's platform was anti-corruption and favoured campaign finance reform as well as increased local control in Belizean government. The party strongly opposed making any territorial concessions with respect to the ongoing Belizean–Guatemalan territorial dispute, inclusive of accepting any potential rulings from the International Court of Justice on the matter. Maheia in particular is a strident opponent of Guatemalan territorial claims in Belize.

== Alliances ==
The PNP joined a coalition of third parties contesting the 2008 general elections, known as the National Belizean Alliance (NBA). The NBA elected Maheia as leader, however the alliance became defunct after the election.

In the years prior to the merger, the PNP maintained an informal alliance with the Belmopan-based Vision Inspired by the People, with which it shared similar anti-corruption stances.
