= National Reform Party (Belize) =

The National Reform Party of Belize was a Belizean, Christian conservative political party seeking office during the 2008 Belizean general election under the following guiding principles. It failed to win any seats and has not contested any elections since.

The party's colors are orange and white. The party emblem is a fist enclosed by a circle, which stands for a combination of "power, security, value and justice... unity, inclusiveness and togetherness." The Party Leader is business man Cornelius Dueck.

== February 21 press conference ==
The NRP held a press conference on February 21, 2007 at its headquarters on the Northern Highway to present its candidates and platform.

Party Leader and candidate for Cayo Northeast, Cornelius Dueck, told listeners that neither the ruling People's United Party nor the Opposition United Democratic Party (Belize) have anything to offer Belizeans. He declared his party's platform to be anti-corruption, pro-development and social upliftment. The NRP promised transparency and upfrontness about campaign financing.

== Nominated candidates ==
- Party Leader Cornelius Dueck, Cayo Northeast
- Belize Rural South, Ernesto Caliz
- Cayo Central, George Boiton Jr.
- Cayo North, Alden McDougal
- Orange Walk South, Enio Lopez
- Orange Walk North, Hilberto Nah
- Orange Walk Central, Alvaro Espejo
- Orange Walk East, Pavel Torres
- Toledo West, Fermin Choc
- Lake Independence, Gary Lambey

== Party officials ==
- Leader, Cornelius Dueck
- National Campaign Coordinator, Esteban Bejerano
- Planning Unit Coordinator, German Cob
- Advisors: George Dueck, Abraham Braun, Emiliano Lozano
