= Belize Progressive Party =

- Leader: Patrick Rogers
- Chairman: George Myvett
- Founded: 30 September 2015
- Merger of: People's National Party; We the People Reform Movement; Vision Inspired by the People (partial)
- Headquarters: PO Box 268, Belmopan, Belize
- Ideology: Social democracy Reformism; Republicanism
- Political position: Centre-left to left-wing
- Colors: Green
- Seats in the Senate: 0 / 12
- Seats in the House: 0 / 31
- Local government: 0 / 67

Party flag

The Belize Progressive Party (BPP) is a Belizean political party founded in 2015 by a merger of several extra-parliamentary opposition groups. The BPP made its electoral debut in the November 2015 general election, in which it fielded 25 candidates and captured 1.63 percent of the vote nationwide (2,336 votes).

The BPP supports a republic in Belize.
