= We the People Reform Movement =

Political party in Belize

The We the People Reform Movement is a Belizean political party established in 2003.

== Leaders ==
National Coordinator: Hipolito Bautista, Lucilo Teck

== Participation in local elections ==
It was established sometime in early 2003 and contested its first general elections not long after. Its 11 candidates won no seats.

In municipal elections for 2006, the WTP participated in Corozal Town, fielding seven candidates including one Mayoral candidate. The WTP finished third in the race but caused the election, won by the United Democratic Party, to be rather close.

The WTP had announced that it would contest the next general elections, to be held in 2008 and recently joined the National Belizean Alliance, established in October 2007; however, they did not field any candidates. The party has not contested any elections since.

== Call for an elected Senate ==
One of the main reforms the WTP says it will introduce is an elected Senate of between 18 and 21 people. It reasons that this Senate will be an improvement over the existing one, which it says is merely a rubberstamp for Cabinet and House of Representatives decisions. Of note is that other prominent Belizeans have called for an elected Senate; the proposal was even included in a report on political reform submitted in 1999. It will be the subject of a national referendum to be held simultaneously with the 2008 general elections on February 7.
