= Vision Inspired by the People =

- Leader: Hubert Enriquez
- Founded: 2005
- Headquarters: Belmopan, Belize
- Colours: Yellow
- Seats in the Senate: 0 / 12
- Seats in the House: 0 / 31
- Local government: 0 / 67

Vision Inspired by the People (VIP) is a political party established in December 2005 in the Cayo District of Belize. It first contested municipal elections in the capital city of Belmopan on 1 March 2006, receiving 20 percent of votes cast but none of the seven seats. VIP operates primarily in Belmopan, but also has a presence in the Belize and Corozal Districts.

Along with the People's National Party, VIP is one of two minor parties which contested both the most recent Belizean general and municipal elections. It has yet to win a seat in the Belize House or a municipal election at the city or town level. In 2015 many VIP members joined the newly formed Belize Progressive Party, however VIP continues to function as a separate entity.

== Formation and nomination ==
The VIP introduced itself to residents of Belmopan on Sunday, 4 December 2005 with a manifesto of planned projects they would implement in Belmopan if elected. The slate of candidates presented included the following:

- Mayor: Paul Morgan
- Councillors: Bobby Lopez, Kamil Espat, Henry Dueck, David Gonzalez, Elvira Brown and Hubert Enriquez.

All seven were well known in the Belmopan area and Morgan and Enriquez had previously contested elections there (News 5). Enriquez is officially Secretary General of the Party and Morgan nominal Party Leader.

The slate were nominated on 14 February 2006 by returning officer for the city Henry Marsden. In an interview with News 5's Karla Vernon, candidate Morgan said that the nation needed "a change" and said that a VIP victory in Belmopan would be the "seed" that would eventually remove "corruption" in the nation's capital.

== Reaction from established parties ==
Neither established political party were ready to welcome their new opponents. The opposition United Democratic Party (UDP), visualizing an easy win in Belmopan and elsewhere, claimed the VIP would distract Belmopan residents and insinuated they had been supported by the ruling People's United Party (PUP). The PUP for their part felt (but did not say publicly) that the UDP had instigated the VIP to run.

The VIP's greatest supporters were the Amandala newspaper and its publisher Evan X Hyde. Amandala wrote a number of editorials and articles in support of the fledgling party, arguing that the PUP and UDP had collectively hijacked local politics for themselves and that third parties needed to step in to at least offer some viable competition.

At a January press conference announcing details for the elections, CEO of the Elections and Boundaries Commission Stuart Leslie announced that incumbent slates would be first on the ballot, opposing slates next and then independent candidates. Morgan objected, saying that ballots produced this way would be denying voters the right to elect the Mayor directly and proposed that Mayoral ballots be separated from that of councillors and that the latter be listed alphabetically and not by party color (Amandala). The commission did not accept Morgan's proposal.

== The elections and post-election reaction ==
On March 1, the electorate voted and the VIP did not win any of the seven seats up for election in Belmopan; the UDP won all seven en route to a 64–3 victory.

Post-election, analysts congratulated the VIP for their courage in participating and said their lack of success was mostly due to a low budget, inexperience in campaign management, image management and Belmopan voters' apathy (few PUP's came out to vote as a sign of discontent with the Musa administration).

=== General election preparations ===
VIP announced in January 2007 that they had selected several candidates for general elections in 2008. Tentative candidates include leader Paul Morgan, Bobby Lopez, Hubert Enriquez, Patrick Rogers, Mateo Polanco and Max Cho. A later addition was Erwin X (Jones) in Port Loyola.

== Recent activity ==
In recent years VIP has maintained an informal alliance with the People's National Party, with which it shares similar anti-corruption stances.

In 2012 VIP nominated candidates for the Belize House in the Belize Rural South and Corozal Bay constituencies, but was not a factor in either election.

In the 2015 municipal elections, VIP candidate Hubert Enriquez finished third in a five-way mayoral race in Belmopan. VIP also ran other municipal candidates in Belmopan and San Pedro Town.
