= Basilio =

Basilio is a name of Italian, Spanish, or Portuguese origin. It is a cognate of the Greek name Basil. Notable people with the name include:

== Given name ==
- Basílio (footballer, born 1949), Brazilian footballer
- Basílio (footballer, born 1972), Brazilian footballer
- Basilio Ah (born 2000), Belizean politician
- Basílio Almeida (born 1971), Portuguese footballer
- Basilio Álvarez (1877–1943), Spanish journalist, politician and catholic priest
- Basilio Álvez (1915–1976), Uruguayan boxer
- Basilio Augustín (1840–1910), Spanish Governor-General of the Philippines
- Basilio Basili (1804–1895), Italian tenor and composer
- Basilio Brollo (1648–1704), Italian missionary to China
- Manuel Basilio Bustamante (1785–1863), Uruguan politician
- Basilio Rodríguez Cañada (born 1961), Spanish writer and Africanist
- Basilio Cascella (1860–1950), Italian painter
- Basilio Cueria (born 1898), Cuban baseball player
- Basílio da Gama (1740–1795), Brazilian poet
- Basílio de Moraes (born 1982), Brazilian sprinter
- Basílio do Nascimento (1950–2021), Roman Catholic bishop of Baucau, East Timor
- Basilio Lami Dozo (1929–2017), Argentine military officer
- Basilio Figueroa (born 1951), Puerto Rican politician
- Basilio García (1791–1844), Spanish military commander
- Alfonso Basilio Ghetaldo (1647–1702), Ragusan bishop of Ston 1694–1702
- Basilio Giordano (born 1952), Italian-Canadian politician
- Basilio Gradi (died 1585), Roman Catholic bishop of Ston 1584–1585
- Basílio Horta (born 1943), Portuguese politician
- Basilio Kaczurak (1919–1987), Ukrainian musician
- Efraím Basílio Krevey (1928–2012), Brazilian bishop
- Basilio Labrador (born 1967), Spanish racewalker
- Basílio Marques (1966–2020), Portuguese football player and manager
- Basilio Muhate (born 1979), Mozambican politician
- Basilio Ndong (born 1999), Equatoguinean footballer
- Basílio Pina de Oliveira Seguro (died 2008), Portuguese soldier and politician
- Basilio Padrón (1928–1999), Argentine footballer
- Basilio Paraíso (1849–1930), Spanish politician
- Basilio Martín Patino (1930–2017), Spanish film director
- Basilio de Bragança Pereira (born 1945), Brazilian statistician
- Basilio Pompili (1858–1931), Italian cardinal
- Basilio Santa Cruz Pumacallao (1635–1710), Quechua painter
- Basilio Puoti (1782–1847), Italian literary critic, lexicographer and grammarian
- Basílio Ramos (born 1952), Cape Verdean politician
- Basilio Repilado (1944–2013), Cuban musician
- Basilio Rieno (born 2004), Equatoguinean footballer
- Basilio Santiago Romero (1928–2010), Puerto Rican politician
- Basilio Rosell (1902–1994), Cuban baseball player
- Basilio Sánchez (1903–1992), Chilean physician
- Basilio Sancho (born 1984), Spanish footballer
- Basilio L. Sarmiento (1890–1970), Filipino poet
- Basílio Teles (1856–1923), Portuguese writer
- Basilio Vadillo (1885–1935), Mexican politician
- Basilio Valdes (1892–1970), Filipino general
- Basilio Villarino (1741–1785), Spanish captain and explorer
- Basilio Zanchi (1501–1558), Italian humanist and scholar

== Surname ==
- Ana Tereza Basilio (born 1967), Brazilian judge, lawyer
- Bianca Basílio (born 1996), Brazilian jiu-jitsu and MMA practitioner
- Cacá Basilio (born 1998), Brazilian footballer
- Carlos San Basilio (born 1965), Spanish economist
- Carmen Basilio (1927–2012), American boxer
- Charles Fernando Basílio da Silva (1985), Brazilian football player
- Enriqueta Basilio (1948–2019), Mexican athlete
- Enzo Basilio (born 1994), French footballer
- Leandro Basílio Rodrigues (born 1989), Brazilian serial killer
- Miriam Basilio (born 1967), American art historian
- Oceana Basílio (born 1979), Portuguese actress and model
- Paloma San Basilio (born 1950), Spanish singer
- Paulo Basilio (born 1975), Brazilian economist
- Wagner Basílio (1959–2025), Brazilian footballer

== Fictional characters ==
- Cousin Basilio, a character and 1878 novel by José Maria de Eça de Queiroz
