= San Basilio =

San Basilio may refer to:

== Places ==
- San Basilio (Rome), a neighbourhood in North-East Rome
- San Basilio, Sardinia, a comune in South Sardinia, Italy
- San Basilio, Grontardo, a Roman Catholic parish church in Grontardo, Cremona, Italy
- San Basilio, Córdoba, a neighbourhood in Córdoba, Spain
- San Basilio de Palenque, a village and corregimiento in Mahates, Bolivar, Colombia

== See also ==
- Basilio (disambiguation)
- Saint Basil the Great
