= Nery Santos Gómez =

Venezuelan-American author (born 1967)

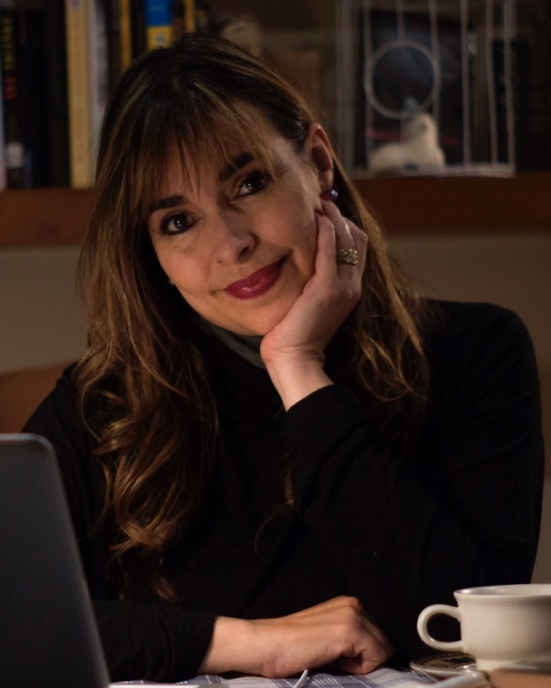
- Nery in Bogotá, 2019
- Born: 1967 (age 58–59); Caracas, Venezuela
- Citizenship: Venezuela (birthplace), United States
- Education: Universidad Católica Andres Bello; Universidad del Sagrado Corazón
- Writing career
- Language: Spanish
- Website: nerysantoswriter.com hilanderadetramas.wordpress.com

Nery Santos Gómez (Caracas, Venezuela, 1967) is a Venezuelan-American author.

== Biography ==
Nery Santos Gómez was born in Caracas, Venezuela on August 21, 1967. She currently holds a degree in Industrial Relations from the Andrés Bello Catholic University (1989) and a master's degree in Literary Creation from the Universidad del Sagrado Corazón in San Juan, Puerto Rico (2016). She has stood out primarily as a result of her stories.

Books published include Hilandera de tramas (2012), Lazareto de Afecciones (2018), and Al borde de la decencia (2019). Other stories have been published in different anthologies internationally. Gómez has participated in the "Palenque" anthology, winner of the 2014 Puerto Rican PEN Club Literature Prize, with her story: Hacinamiento.

She was a finalist, published in the Bovarismos International Women's Narrative Award 2014 contest in Miami with her story: Desde mi balcón. Moreover, she was among the winners of the Puerto Rican Writers' Guild "Entre Libros" short story competition in May 2016 and was published with her story: El mundo entero. Gómez was part of the board of directors of the Writers Guild of Puerto Rico in 2013 and 2014. She participated in the Borinquen Writing Project at the Universidad del Sagrado Corazón where she obtained the degree of "Writing Consultant”. She is currently a full member of the Colombian Academy of Letters and Philosophy of Bogotá, Colombia.

Gómez's book Lazareto de afecciones was chosen by El Nuevo Dia as one of the best books of 2018. One year later, Lazareto de afecciones won three awards – Best Collection of Short Stories (1st place), Best Latino Fiction Book (2nd place), and Best Popular Fiction Book (2nd place) – at the 2019 International Latino Book Awards, ILBA.

Gómez's book Al borde de la decencia was announced as the winner of the 2019 International "Anaïs Nin" Literature Prize by the Spanish Sial Pigmalión Publishing Group in November of that year.

In 2020, during the COVID-19 pandemic, Gómez served as the coordinator for the anthology "Cuarentena literaria. Poemas y relatos que escaparon al encierro", a compilation of poems and stories written by forty authors from ten countries and four continents (North America, South America, Europe, and Africa) in quarantine.

In 2022, she was coordinator of the anthology "Frankfurt: territorio literario", presented at the Frankfurter Buchmesse 2022 as a tribute to the city. The anthology has forty-five authors from five continents, and a prologue by Ricardo Martínez Vásquez, the Ambassador of Spain to Germany.

Gómez's book Al borde de la decencia was announced as the winner of the 2019 International "Anaïs Nin" Literature Prize by the Spanish Sial Pigmalión Publishing Group in November of that year.

In 2026, Gómez was awarded the International "Gabriela Mistral" Poetry Prize by the Sial Pigmalión Publishing Group for her book Yo, animal and her overall body of work. The prize honors Gabriela Mistral, the Chilean poet and 1945 Nobel Prize laureate in Literature. The award was unanimously conferred by the 2026 international jury, chaired by Francisco Gutiérrez Carbajo.

== Publications ==
=== Books ===
- Hilandera de tramas, 2012
- Lazareto de afecciones, 2018
- Al borde de la decencia, 2019
- Transcending the Lazaretto (English version of Lazareto de afecciones), 2020
- Fronteras desdibujadas, 2021
- El baile de los colores, 2022
- Almazuela (Fronteras desdibujadas II), 2023
- ¡Pruébame! (Desdibujando fronteras), 2024
- Yo, animal, 2026

=== Stories ===
- Las maletas, 2012 (published in Huellas a la mar: Tercera antología internacional de revista Literarte)
- Hacinamiento, 2013 (published in Palenque: Antología puertorriqueña)
- Desordenadas palomitas de maíz, 2013 (published in Karmasensual8)
- Desde mi balcón, 2014 (published in Soñando en Vrindavan y otras historias de ellas)
- El mundo entero, 2016 (published in Entre libros)
- Osadas orquídeas, 2018 (published in Divina: La mujer en veinte voces)
- Depresión, 2018 (published in Divina: La mujer en veinte voces)
- Yo, el fisgón de doña Elena, 2018 (published in Divina: La mujer en veinte voces)
- De mangos y mujeres divinas, 2018 (published in Divina: La mujer en veinte voces)
- Serendipitas, 2020 (published in Amores de cine. Pasiones más allá del celuloide)
- En la fila del cine, 2020 (published in Amores de cine. Pasiones más allá del celuloide)
- Cuarentena literaria. Poemas y relatos que escaparon al encierro, 2020 (Coordinator)
- Frankfurt: territorio literario, 2022 (Coordinator)

== See also ==
- Venezuelan literature
- Colombian literature
- Puerto Rican literature
- Latin American literature
