= Grupo Compay Segundo =

Cuban musical group

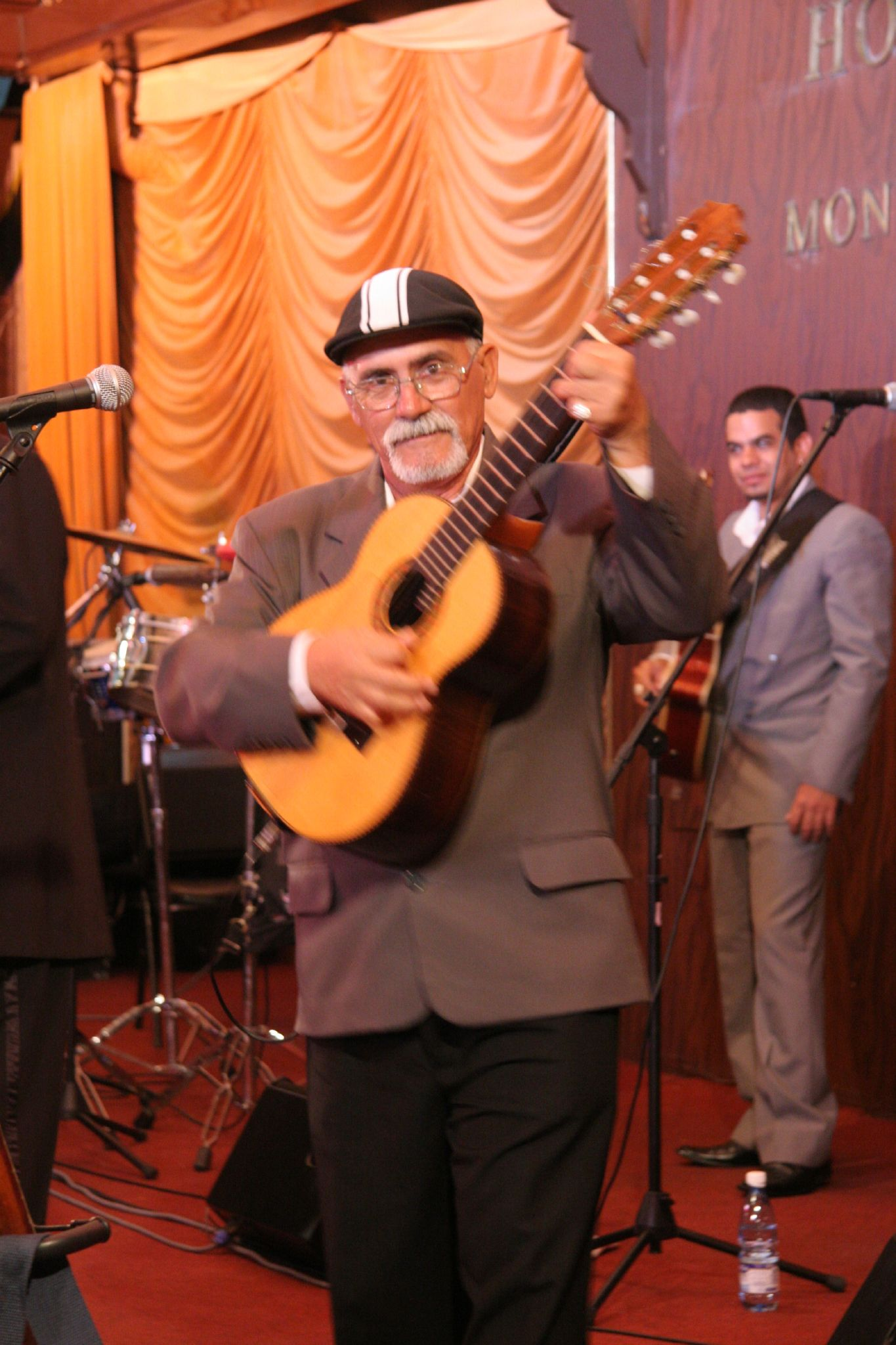
Felix Martinez of Grupo Compay Segundo with an Armonico.

Grupo Compay Segundo is a Cuban musical group created after the death of Compay Segundo by the remaining members of his band and his son, Basilio Repilado.

== History ==
The group started life as Compay Segundo y sus Muchachos, founded by Compay Segundo in 1955 after he left Los Compadres. The group was then relaunched in 1992 and underwent several personnel changes during the 90's. After Compay Segundo's death in 2003, the group was renamed as Grupo Compay Segundo. Grupo Compay Segundo, the legend of Chan Chan, returned to Europe as well. As a true master of words and music, Compay Segundo became a legend in Cuba and was very popular everywhere in the world. With his cigar and his Panama hat on his head, he mastered the armónico, a seven string guitar he had created. After Segundo died in July 2003, his son, Salvador Repilado, who was also his contradouble bass player, became director of his orchestra. The Grupo Compay Segundo was born. He also took part with his father and Hugo Garzon to the Buena Vista Social Club project. Their song Chan Chan is a major piece of this work.

As official ambassadors of the Cuban music around the world, the Grupo Compay Segundo proudly carries the identity of the "SON" and the traditional Cuban music.

From its inception, the band has not hesitated to go all over the world, keeping every kind of audience captivated, and it has featured great artists such as Omara Portuondo, Eliades Ochoa, Charles Aznavour, Teresa Garcia Caturla, Isaac Delgado, Lou Bega, and others. Songs such as " Macusa ", Saboroso ", " Anita ", " las Flores de la Vida ", as well as the legendary anthem " Chan Chan ", emblematic song written by Compay and played by every band of the genre around the world, are played for us by the nine musicians from the Grupo Compay Segundo, on stage as a real cheerful gift.

== Band members ==
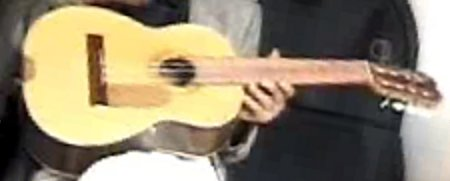
Armónico

- Salvador Repilado - Double Bass
- Felix Martinez - Armonico
- Nilso Arias - Guitar, backing vocals
- yoel Matos - Guitar
- Rafael Inciarte - First Clarinet
- Haskell Armenteros - Second Clarinet
- Hugo Garzon - First vocals, maracas
- Rafael Fournier - Bongos, percussion
