= Hispano-French Exposition of 1908 =

Exposition held in Zaragoza, Spain

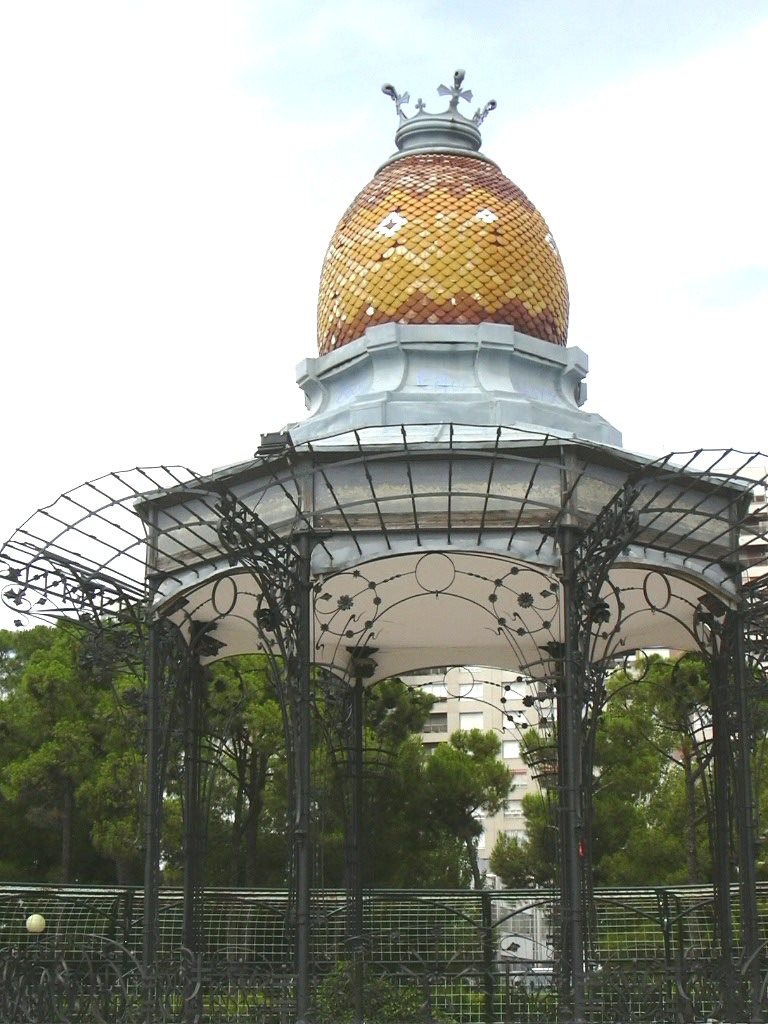
Bandstand created for the exposition by José y Manuel Martínez de Ubago

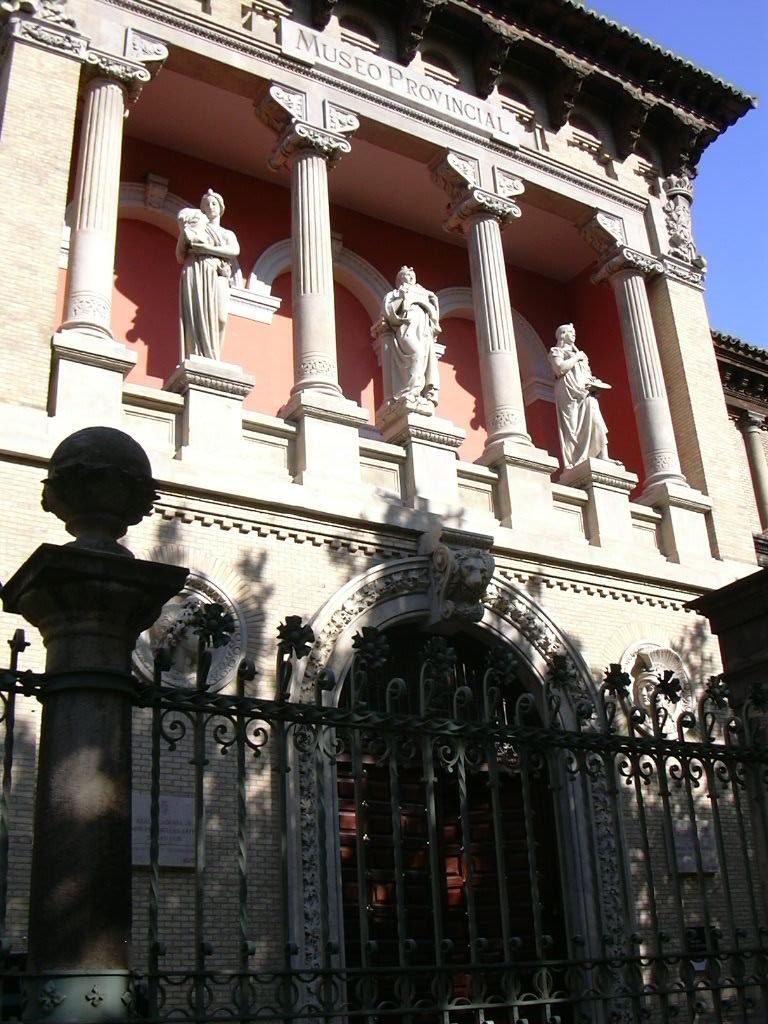
Facade of the Provincial Museum

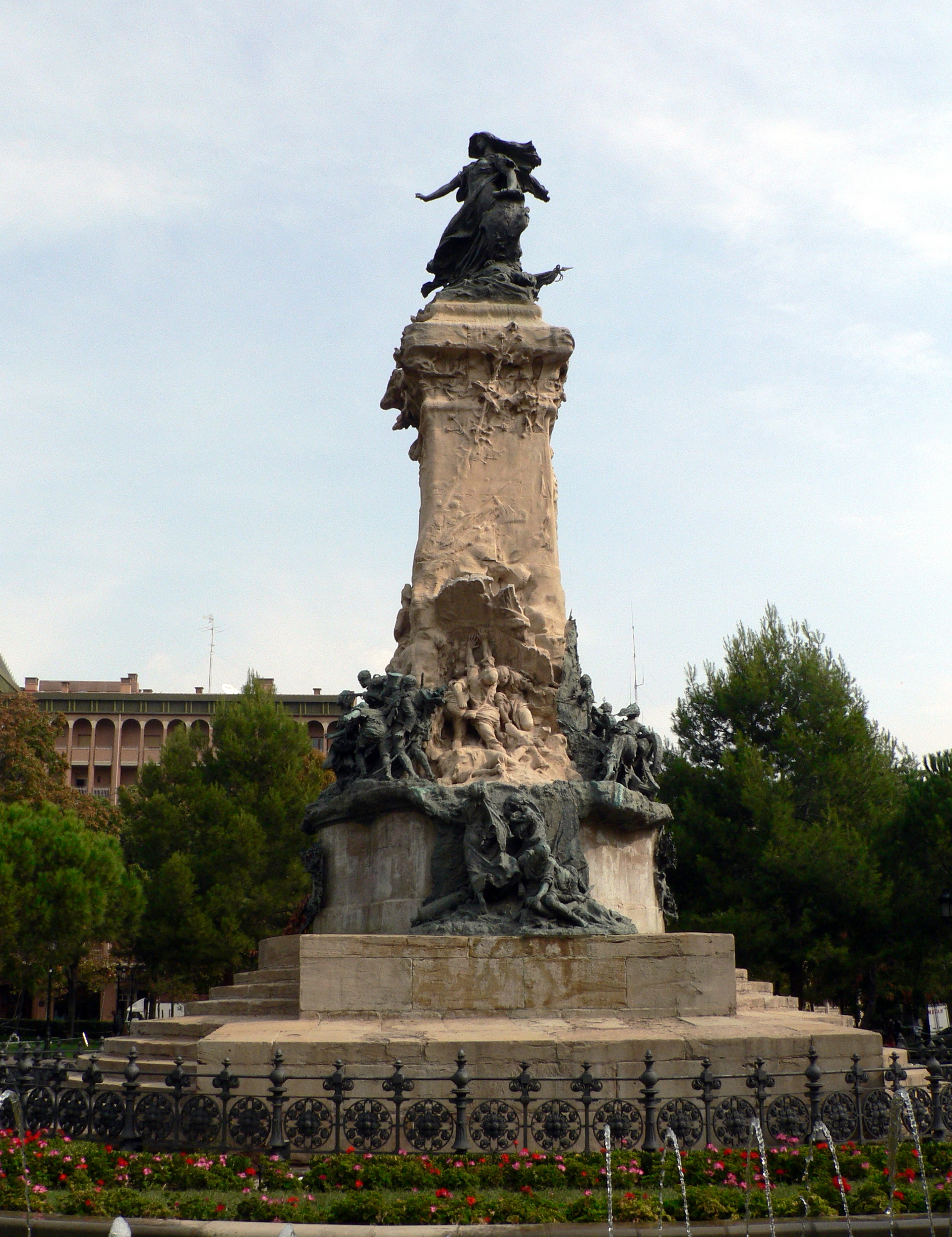
Santiago Querol's Monumento a los Sitios reflects Art Nouveau style

The Hispano-French Exposition was an exposition held in Zaragoza from May to December 1908 to commemorate the hundred-year anniversary of the first siege of Zaragoza.

== History ==
=== Background ===
In 1902, the city of Zaragoza decided to celebrate the first centennial of the siege, and to make the celebration a regular event. The Commemorative Committee of the Siege (Junta Conmemorativa de los Sitios) was formed. An industrial exposition was planned, but its magnitude was uncertain due to the lack of funds.

In 1906, the national government decided to provide 2.5 million pesetas to finance the exposition, whereupon the executive committee of the Exposition was established, headed by Basilio Paraíso, a local businessman. Paraiso organized the commemoration of the centenary and the Exposition, placing Ricardo Magdalena in charge of the planning. The exposition was regarded as a modern event, with the purpose of demonstrating the cultural and economic vitality of the city and of Aragon, while at the same time serving to strengthen Spanish ties with their French neighbors, and continue to improve diplomatic relations following the events of the Peninsular War of the previous century.

=== Event ===
Even so, not everything was done entirely according to Paraiso's taste. Conservative elements such as Florencio Jardiel, the president of the organizational committee of the centenary, also had their say in the organization and in the execution of the event. Jardiel's mark could be seen in the importance of the Marine Pavilion and in the results of the National Pedagogical Congress of Zaragoza.

The land used for the Exposition was the so-called Huerta de Santa Engracia, surrounding the current Plaza de los Sitios. 36,500 workers were hired to work on the projects of Ricardo Magdalena and other architects. Magdalena designed the most important buildings; among those that he was responsible for were the present-day Museo Provincial de Zaragoza, an enormous Neo-Renaissance palace inspired by the Aragonese palaces of the 16th century, and the Gran Casino, a modernist building that existed until 1930. The younger architects were in charge of the other buildings. Félix Navarro was responsible for the Escuela de Artes y Oficios which is still standing, in the Plaza de los Sitios. In the center of the Plaza was erected the Monumento a los Sitios by Agustí Querol Subirats, a Catalan sculptor who executed it in a modernist style; it still can be seen today.

The majority of the buildings were modernist and of a temporary nature, constructed with inexpensive materials such as wood, plaster and adobe, and torn down after the Exposition. Among those razed were the Theater, the Entrance Gate, the Food Pavilion, the Marian Pavilion, and the Central Pavilion, or French Pavilion, in a neo-Rococo style, which thrilled the visitors with a section dedicated to the French automobile industry.

More than 5,000 exhibitors participated, the most-visited being those involved in agriculture, food, mechanical industries, and manufactured products. In addition one could see exhibits related to crafts, sanitation, and chemical and pharmaceutical products. Among the exhibitors were both public institutions such as the French government and the Ministry of Development, and private businesses such as Altos Hornos de Vizcaya, which had its own pavilion. Catalonia also had a significant presence (there was a small incident during a toast to the regional architect Josep Puig i Cadafalch that did not please some conservative Zaragozans).

The exposition coincided with several other congresses, which included the Science, National Agriculture, Chamber of Commerce, Exports, Economic and Tourism Society. There was also the great Artistic Exposition of contemporary art and arte retrospectivo, that is, art of the past.

The public success, with more than half a million visitors, caused the event to be extended by two months. Among the notable visitors was King Alfonso XIII, who visited the Exposition on several occasions.

=== Legacy ===
Zaragoza hosted another Exposition, Expo 2008, which coincided with the bicentenary of the siege, with the intent of turning this into a centennial event.
