= Marcial Mes =

Belizean politician

Marcial Mes (c. 1949 – May 26, 2014) was a Belizean politician and a member of the People's United Party. He was elected to parliament in 1998, representing the Toledo West constituency.

Mes served as Minister of Rural Development and Culture from 1998 to 2001, Minister of Rural Development from 2001 until 2003, and Minister of Human Development, Local Government, and Labour, from 2003 until 2005.

In 2007, Mes was briefly suspended from his duties at the Minister of States in the Ministry of National Development, due to a charge of a hit-and-run accident but the case did not go to court and Mes was restored to his post.

On May 26, 2014, Mes died in a road traffic accident in rural Toledo District. He was 64.
