= Torre de Belén =

Tower in Córdoba, Spain

Coordinates: 37°52′36″N 04°47′28″W

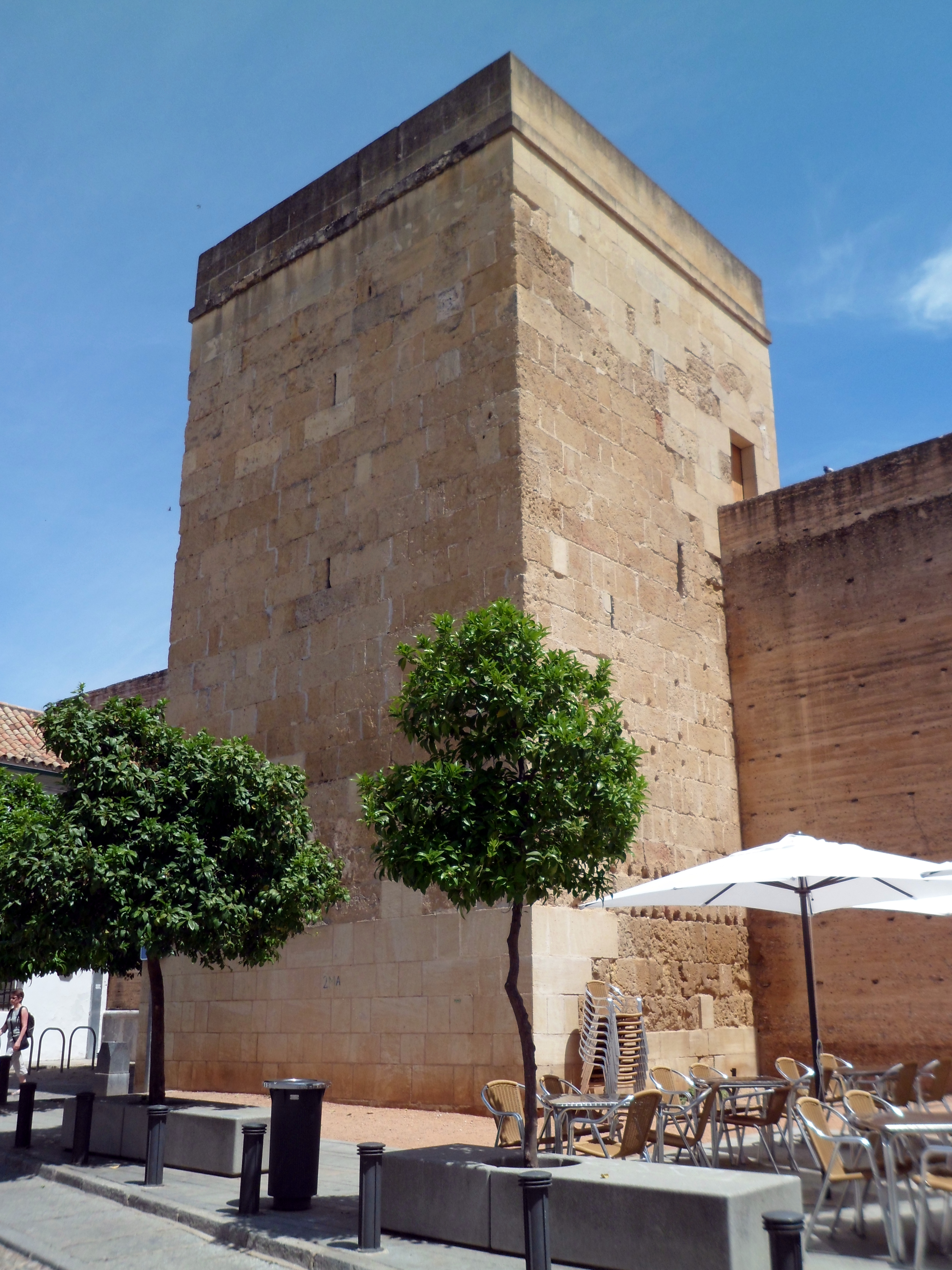
Torre de Benén, Córdoba

The Torre de Belén (literally: Bethlehem Tower) is located in the San Basilio neighbourhood of Córdoba, Spain. It forms part of the Historic centre of Córdoba, a UNESCO World Heritage Site. The tower is a fine example of a former defensive gate providing access to a walled enclosure.

== Description ==
The tower is square-shaped, the sides measuring 7.4 m (24 ft). Built of limestone ashlar blocks, arranged in alternating layers of headers and stretchers, it is accessed through two doors at right angles to each other. The outer door to the north has a pointed Islamic horseshoe arch while the inner door to the east leads into the ground floor which was once converted into a chapel. As a result, the building was also known as Torre de las Imágines (Tower of the Pictures) or Torre de San Benito (Saint Benedict's Tower). There are two upper floors in the tower, each with hemispherical vaulting. From the first floor, the city walls can be accessed through rounded arches to the north and south. The three rounded arches in the eastern wall once housed the chapel bells. There is disagreement as to whether the tower is of 12th-century Almohad origin or was built later during the Christian period. It does however appear to have been consolidated as part of the defences following the Christian conquest of Córdoba in 1236.

The tower underwent restoration work in 2000 which also included the chapel and the altarpiece.

== Gallery ==
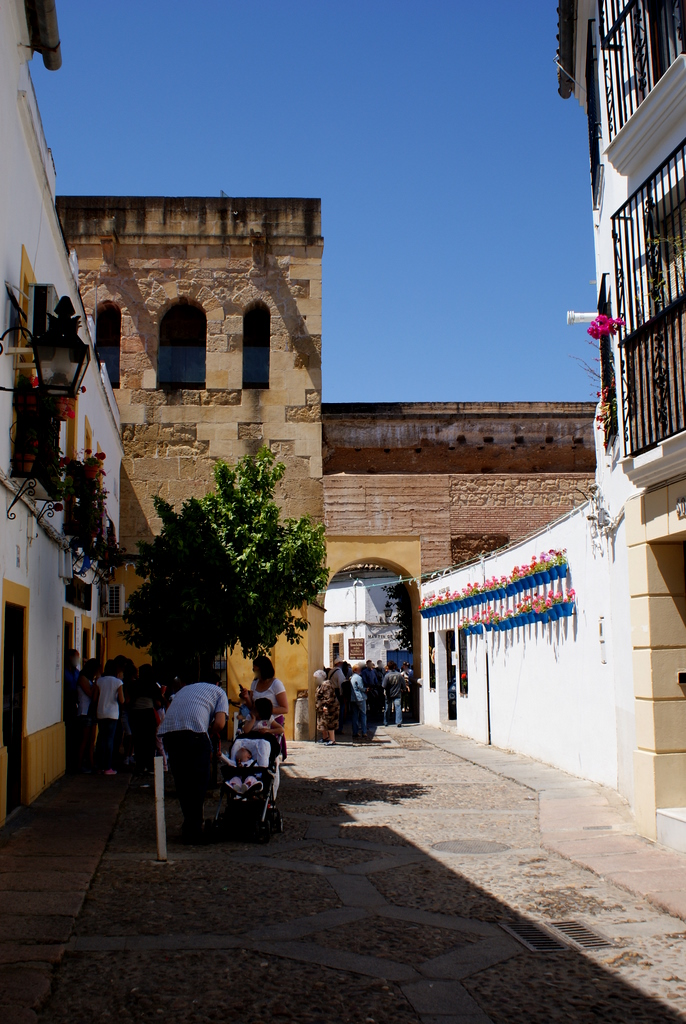
Eastern wall from San Basilio

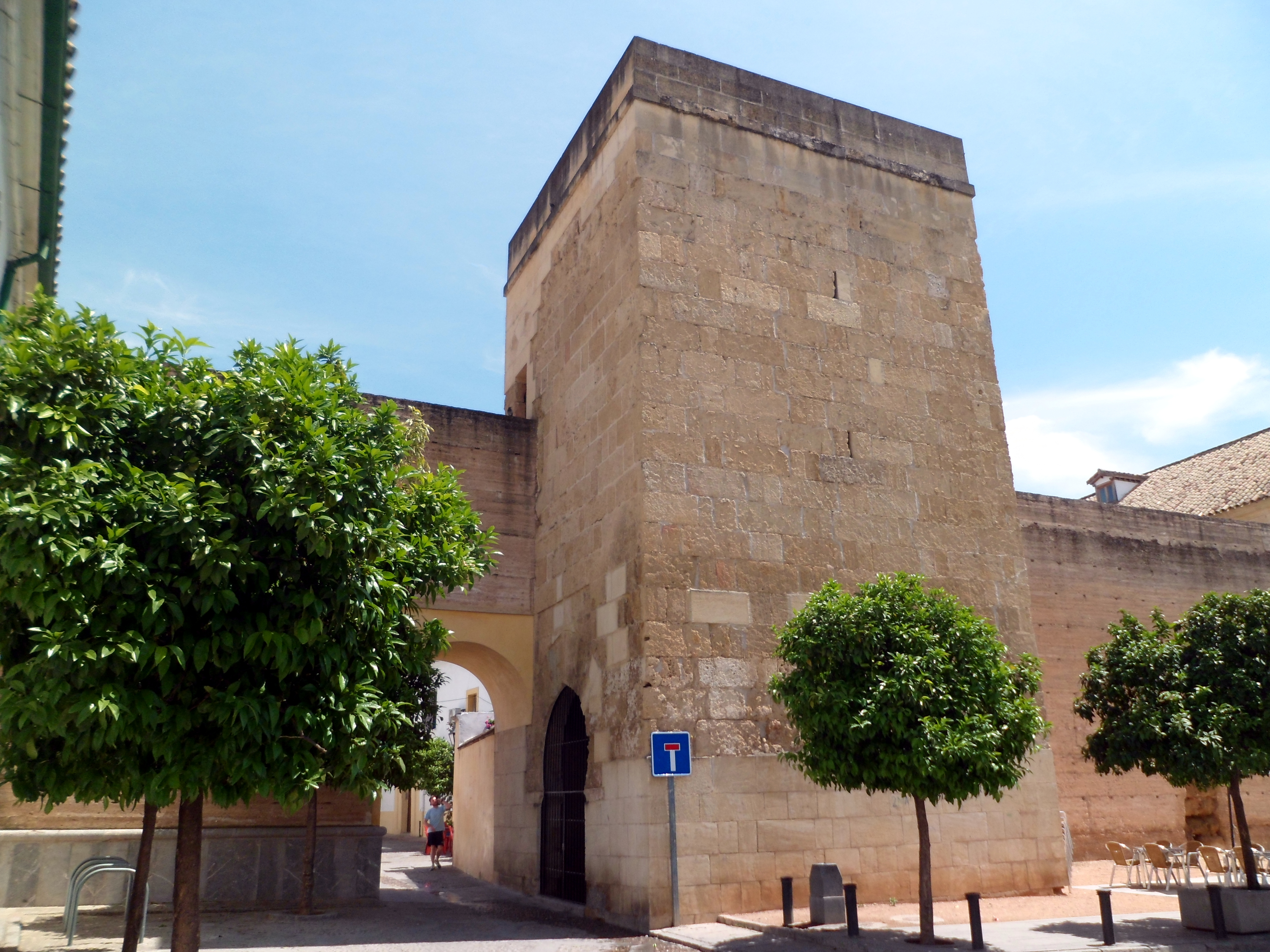
View from the northwest

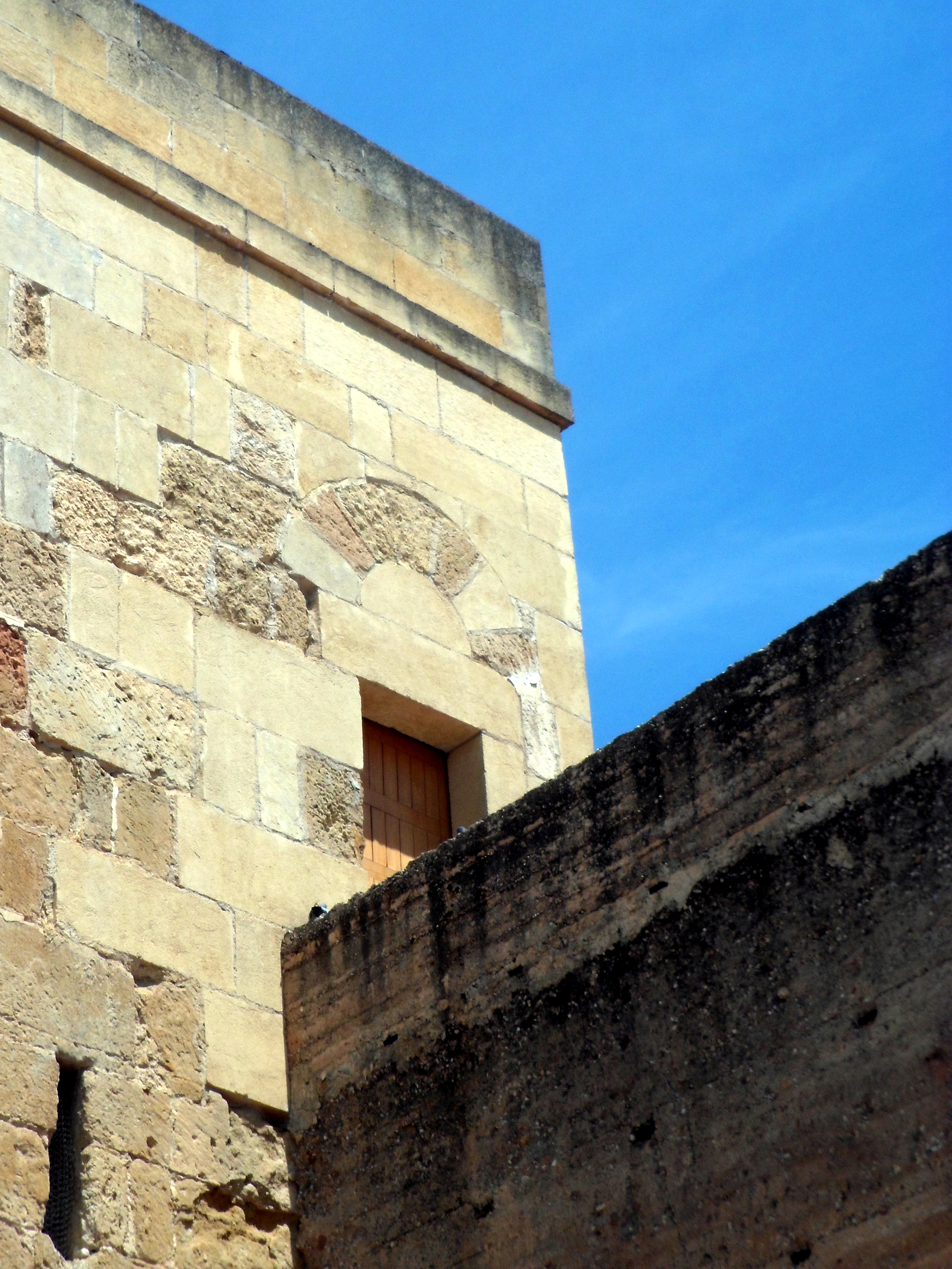
Access to the city walls
