= Toledo West =

Electoral constituency in Belize

- Constituency for the Belize House of Representatives
- District: Toledo

Current constituency

Toledo West is an electoral constituency in the Toledo District represented in the House of Representatives of the National Assembly of Belize.

== Area representatives ==
Election	Area representative	Party
1984	Basilio Ah	UDP
1989	Stanley Usher	UDP
1993	Dennis Usher	UDP
1998	Marcial Mes	PUP
2003	Marcial Mes	PUP
2008	Juan Coy	UDP
2012	Oscar Requeña	PUP
2015	Oscar Requeña	PUP
2020	Oscar Requeña	PUP

== Elections ==
Election	Political result	Candidate	Party	Votes	%	±%
2025 general election Electorate: 7,804; Turnout: 5,385 (69.00%) −17.06	PUP hold Majority: 2,286 (42.45%) +19.25	Oscar Requena	PUP	3,8209	70.73	+9.13
2025 general election Electorate: 7,804; Turnout: 5,385 (69.00%) −17.06	PUP hold Majority: 2,286 (42.45%) +19.25	Alfonso Sanchez Jr.	UDP	1,523	28.28	−10.12
