= Cacá Basilio =

Brazilian footballer

Personal information
- Full name: Caique Medeiros Basilio
- Date of birth: 25 October 1998 (age 28)
- Place of birth: Brazil
- Height: 1.79 m (5 ft 10 in)
- Position: Defensive midfielder

Youth career
- Guaratinguetá

Senior career*
Years	Team	Apps	(Gls)
–2020	Plácido de Castro		
2020–2021	CRB	16	(0)
2021	Ipatinga	0	(0)
2021	Ypiranga	5	(0)
2021–2022	Real Estelí	13	(0)
2022	UE Santa Coloma	0	(0)
2022–2023	Paniliakos	27	(0)
2023	Banga Gargždai	7	(0)
2023–2024	Persikabo 1973	16	(0)
2025	Sitra	0	(0)
2025	Al-Hidd	0	(0)
- * Club domestic league appearances and goals as of 29 April 2024

Caique Medeiros Basilio (born 25 October 1998), commonly known as Cacá Basilio, is a Brazilian professional footballer who plays as a defensive midfielder.

== Club career ==
Born in Brazil, Basilio has played for his home clubs Plácido de Castro, CRB, Ipatinga, and Ypiranga Clube. He has also played for overseas clubs Real Estelí in Nicaragua, UE Santa Coloma in Andorra and Paniliakos in Greece.

=== Banga Gargždai ===
In March 2023, it was announced that Basilio would represent Banga Gargždai. He played in the number 28 jersey. On 15 March 2023 he made his league debut against Džiugas Telšiai.

In June 2023, it was announced that the player was leaving Bangos. He contributed with only 7 league appearances with the club, which has earned him 178 minutes of playing time.

=== Persikabo 1973 ===
On 4 November 2023, Basilio signed a contract with Indonesian Liga 1 club Persikabo 1973, he last defended the Lithuanian club Banga Gargždai in the 2023 season. He made his Liga 1 debut on 4 November 2023 as a substituted in a 2–1 home win over RANS Nusantara.

== Honours ==
=== Club ===
Real Estelí

- Liga Primera de Nicaragua: 2022–23
