= Paulo Basilio =

Brazilian economist

Paulo Luiz Araujo Basilio (born 1974 or 1975) is a Brazilian economist and the chief financial officer of the Kraft Heinz Corporation.

== Biography ==
Basilio earned a bachelor's degree in economics from Universidade de Brasilia and a master of science degree in economics from Fundacao Getulio Vargas. He served as a partner at 3G Capital Partners LP and was chief executive officer of America Latina Logistica from 2010-2012.

=== Kraft Heinz ===
Basilio joined then-H.J. Heinz Company in 2013 as its chief financial officer. He left that position in 2017, turning it over to 29-year old David Knopf, to serve in other positions in the company. On August 26, 2019, Kraft Heinz CEO Miguel Patricio announced that Basilio would return to the CFO position following a series of accounting errors and misstatements that caused the company to restate its financial earnings.

=== Compensation ===
In 2018 while serving as Zone President of U.S. for Kraft Heinz, Basilio received $18,845,822 in total compensation.
