= Basilio Padrón =

Argentine footballer

Personal information
- Full name: Basilio Padrón Genelline
- Date of birth: 12 May 1928
- Place of birth: Buenos Aires, Argentina
- Date of death: 18 January 1999 (aged 70)
- Position: Striker

Senior career*
Years	Team	Apps	(Gls)
1948–1949	Platense	6	(2)
1951–1952	Río Guayas		
1952–1955	La Salle		
1955–1957	Valencia	10	(0)
1957–1959	Las Palmas	12	(1)
- * Club domestic league appearances and goals

Basilio Padrón Genelline (12 May 1928 – 18 January 1999) was an Argentine professional footballer who played in the Argentine Primera División and La Liga.

== Career ==
Born in Buenos Aires, Padrón began playing football as a striker with local side Club Atlético Platense. In 1951, he moved to Ecuador where he participated in the first Campeonato Profesional de Fútbol de Guayaquil with Club Sport Río Guayas. He had a spell in Venezuela with La Salle FC before moving to Spain to play in La Liga with CF Valencia and UD Las Palmas.
