= Basilio Repilado =

Cuban musician (1944–2013)

Basilio Repilado (4 March 1944 – 4 December 2013) was a Cuban musician. He is mainly notable as one of the five sons of Compay Segundo, seeking to expand on and promote his father's musical legacy. He joined his father's band, Compay Segundo y Sus Muchachos, in 1999 as a backing vocalist and percussionist. On Compay Segundo's Duets album they recorded together a version of "Linda Graciela" that Billboard, counted "an exercise in understated beauty and excellent ensemble work" and one of the highlights of the album. He is also known in Havana as an intense Beatles fan, promoting Beatles tributes.

== Discography ==
- Fibras del alma (2007)
