= Miriam Basilio =

American art historian (born 1967)

Miriam Margarita Basilio Gaztambide (born 1967 in San Juan, Puerto Rico) is a Puerto Rican-Spanish Associate Professor of Art History and Museum Studies at New York University. She teaches in both undergraduate and graduate departments. Her research areas include art, exhibitions, and propaganda created during the Second Spanish Republic, the Spanish Civil War, and Franco's dictatorship. She also studies and teaches courses related to contemporary Spanish, Puerto Rican, and queer and feminist art, global biennials and curatorial practices, and histories of collecting and exhibiting Latin American and Latine art.

== Education ==
Basilio holds an M.A. (1995) and a Ph.D (2002) from New York University's Institute of Fine Arts. She was also awarded an M.A. in Liberal Studies with a Certificate in Museum Studies from New York University's Graduate School of Arts and Science in 1991. She speaks Spanish, English, and Catalan.

== Career ==
Basilio's first book,Visual Propaganda, Exhibitions, and the Spanish Civil War, was published by Ashgate (now Routledge) in 2013. It analyzes images that were widely circulated and regularly encountered by Spaniards on city walls, in print, and in exhibitions during wartime. As Basilio argues, tangible elements of the nation's past such as "monuments, cultural property, and art-historical icons" were displayed and reproduced in order to rally the population, define national identity, and reinvent distant and recent history.

Basilio's later text, Latin American Art at The Museum of Modern Art: The Power of the Canon, was published by Routledge in 2025. Expanding on earlier scholarship such as her 2004 essay, "Reflecting on a History of Collecting and Exhibiting Work by Artists from Latin America" in Latin American and Caribbean Art: MoMA at El Museo (that emphasizes the Museum of Modern Art's (MoMA)'s curatorial influence on what constitutes "Latin American art"), the text further illuminates the under-examined preeminence of MoMA's role in establishing the definition of Latin American art in the United States from the 1930s to the present. As Basilio argues, this definition has been wrought through the museum's collection display tactics over time, and is problematic. In examining the shifting categorization of Latin American works according to stylistic and geographic taxonomies, Basilio writes, we can gain a greater understanding of the organization of the Museum's collections as a whole during the 1940s and 1950s. The book is the first to document these institutional precedents, which are crucial for understanding the articulation of a Modernist canon and its contested legacy.

Her artist's book Retratos Hablados/Spoken Portraits published by Mudito & Co in 2020 includes a series of drawings and a bilingual Spanish and English essay by the author. She describes the essay as a campy, mordant, and feminist take on portraits of Spanish royals, aristocrats, and celebrities in relation to the history of royal portraiture and recent political controversies related to the Spanish monarchy. Basilio has published numerous essays in scholarly journals, books, and exhibition catalogs. She has also curated a number of exhibitions, and as a Curatorial Assistant at the Museum of Modern Art, she co-curated Tempo (2002) and Latin American and Caribbean Art: MoMA at El Museo (2004).

=== Selected articles ===
- "Staging the Reconquest: The 1940 Exposición de la Hispanidad" in The Edinburgh Companion to Spanish Civil War Visual Culture edited by Robert Lubar Messeri, Eugenia Afinoguénova and Silvina Gesser (Edinburgh University Press, 2026)
- "Latin American Artists of the Twentieth Century: Surveying an Emerging Canon" in Ilona Katzew and Rachel Kaplan, eds. Visualizing the Americas: Essays in Honor of Edward J. Sullivan (Brepols, 2026)
- ""An Anti-Fascist Subject, Not Very Beautiful, But Very Truthful," La Guerra Civil, in 1937" in Beverly Adams and Christophe Cherix, eds. Wilfredo Lam, When I Don't Sleep, I Dream (New York: The Museum of Modern Art, 2025)
- "Evolving Taxonomies at The Museum of Modern Art in the 1930s and '40s and the Definitions of the "Latin American Collection," in Edward J. Sullivan, ed. The Americas Revealed: Collecting Colonial and Latin American Art in the United States (Pennsylvania State University Press, 2018), 28-43
- "'First Win the War!' Kati Horna, Gendered Images, and Political Discord During the Spanish Civil War," in Gabriela Rangel, ed. Told and Untold: The Photo Stories of Kati Horna in the Illustrated Press (New York: Americas Society, 2016), 56-73
- The "Exhibition of Government Posters" (1937) in The Museum of Modern Art: Cartelesrepublicanos cómo modelos de diseño vanguardista y de efectividad pedagógica, in Miguel Cabañas Bravo and Wifredo Rincón, eds. Las redes del arte desde 1900 (Madrid: Consejo Superior de Investigaciones Cientificas, 2014), 67-74
- "Equipo Crónica: Art History, Narrative Figuration, and Critical Realism," in Robert S. Lubar and Maria Dolores Jiménez Blanco, Eds. Transatlantic Dialogues: Art History, Criticism, and Exhibition Practices in Spain and the United States (Madrid: Centro de Estudios Europa Hispánica, 2014)
- "Esto lo vio Picasso: Goya, los grabados satíricos, el realismo, y la propaganda republicana en guerra," Manuel Borja-Villel and Rosario Peiro eds. Años Treinta: Teatro de la Crueldad, lugar de encuentro (Madrid: Museo Nacional Museo Nacional Centro de Arte Reina Sofía, 2013) (English ed. 2013), 145-157
- "'Serial Effects': Picasso’s Response to Propaganda and Atrocities" in Picasso: Vinyetes al front (Barcelona: Museu Picasso, 2011), 102-111, 190-194. (Catalan, Spanish, and English)
- "Museums for the People: David Seymour’s Photographs of The Duque of Alba’s Palace in Madrid, 1936," in Cynthia Young, ed. The Mexican Suitcase (New York: International Center of Photography, 2010), 69-70. (Spanish ed. Madrid: La Fábrica Editorial and Fundación Pablo Iglesias, 2011)
- "Impermanence and Entropy: Collaborative Efforts Installing Contemporary Art," co-authored with Sydney Briggs and Roger Griffith, Journal of the American Institute of Conservation 47 (2008), 3-13
- "Catalans! Catalunya: Posters and Propaganda in Catalonia During the Spanish Civil War." In William H. Robinson, Jordi Falgàs, and Carmen Belen Lord eds. Barcelona & Modernity: Gaudí, Picasso, Miró, Dalí (Yale University Press, 2006), 436-449
- "Genealogies for a New State: Painting and Propaganda in Franco’s Spain, 1936-1940," in Discourse: Journal for Theoretical Studies in Media and Culture 24:3 (Nov. 2003), 67-94
- "Corporal Evidence: Representations of Aileen Wuornos," Art Journal, Winter 1996, 56-61
