= San Basilio, Córdoba =

Coordinates: 37°52′30″N 04°47′00″W

San Basilio
- Neighbourhood
- Country: Spain
- Autonomous community: Andalusia
- Province: Córdoba
- Municipality: Córdoba

UNESCO World Heritage Site
- Part of: Historic centre of Córdoba
- Criteria: Cultural: (i), (ii), (iii), (iv)
- Reference: 313bis
- Inscription: 1984 (8th Session)
- Extensions: 1994

San Basilio (Spanish: Barrio de San Basilio) is one of the neighbourhoods in the Centro district of Córdoba, Spain. It is bordered by the River Guadalquivir to the southeast. The district was specifically included in the Historic centre of Córdoba as part of the UNESCO World Heritage site. Among its historic monuments are the Alcázar de los Reyes Cristianos and the Royal Stables of Córdoba.

== History ==
San Basilio is named after the saint to whom the parish of Nuestra Señora de la Paz (Our Lady of Peace) was dedicated. It has a history going back to the years immediately following Córdoba's conquest by the Spaniards in 1236. At the beginning of the 15th century, it was decided to combat the city's lagging population by accommodating crossbowmen and their families there, especially as they could also man the surrounding defences.

The quarter has three main streets which run parallel to each other: Postera, Enmedio and San Basilio. Unlike the winding streets elsewhere in the city centre, they are perfectly straight, introducing a more rational approach to urban planning. By contrast, the generally two-storey, whitewashed houses have an Arabic look, arranged as they are around central courtyards or patios forming a neighbourhood known as "Los Patios Cordobeses". From the late 14th century, the area was occupied by Jewish converts who created a ghetto. An attempt to banish them failed, thanks to mediation by the Catholic monarchs in 1479. However, as a result of poor sanitation, they were later moved to nearby San Nicolas de la Villa.

One of the most interesting structures in San Basilio is the Torre de Belén, a fine example of a former defensive gate providing access to a walled enclosure. The parish Church of San Basilio, on the site of a monastery founded in 1590, is built in the 17th-century Baroque style with period furnishings. The 18th-century convent "Cofradía de Nuestra Señora de la Paz" houses the richly decorated altarpiece from the former "Convento de Santa Clara".

== Gallery ==
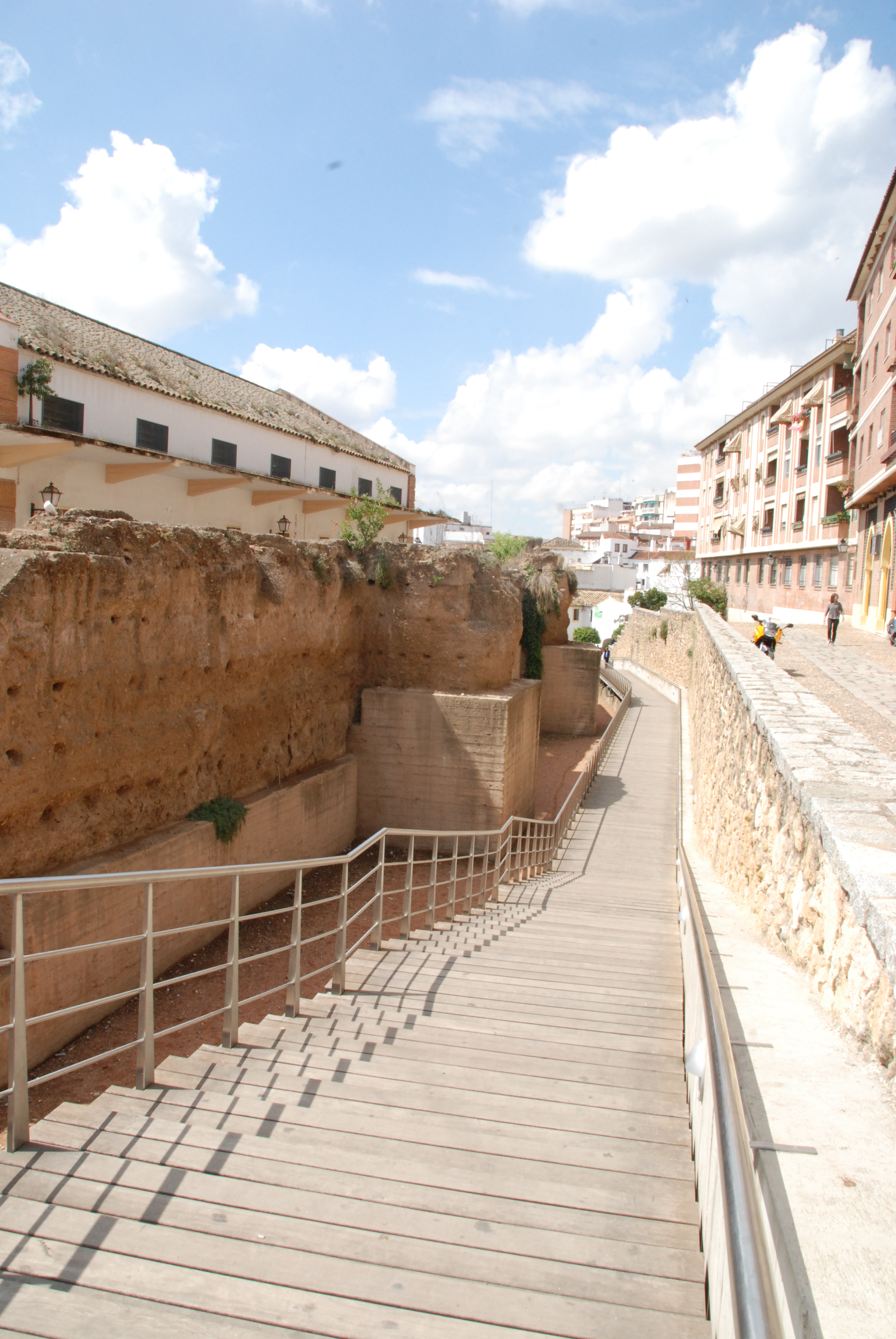
Alcázar Viejo wall

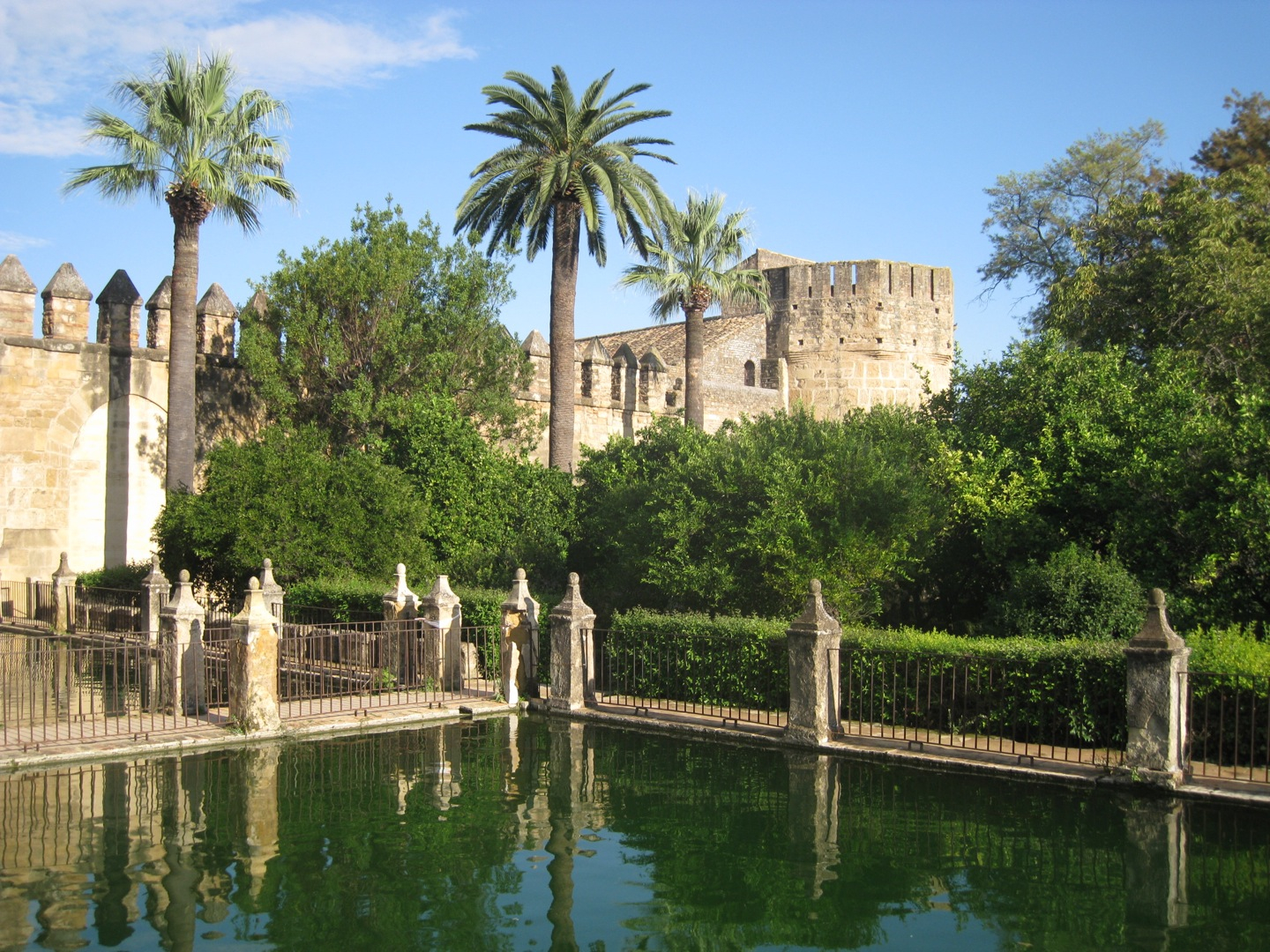
Alcázar

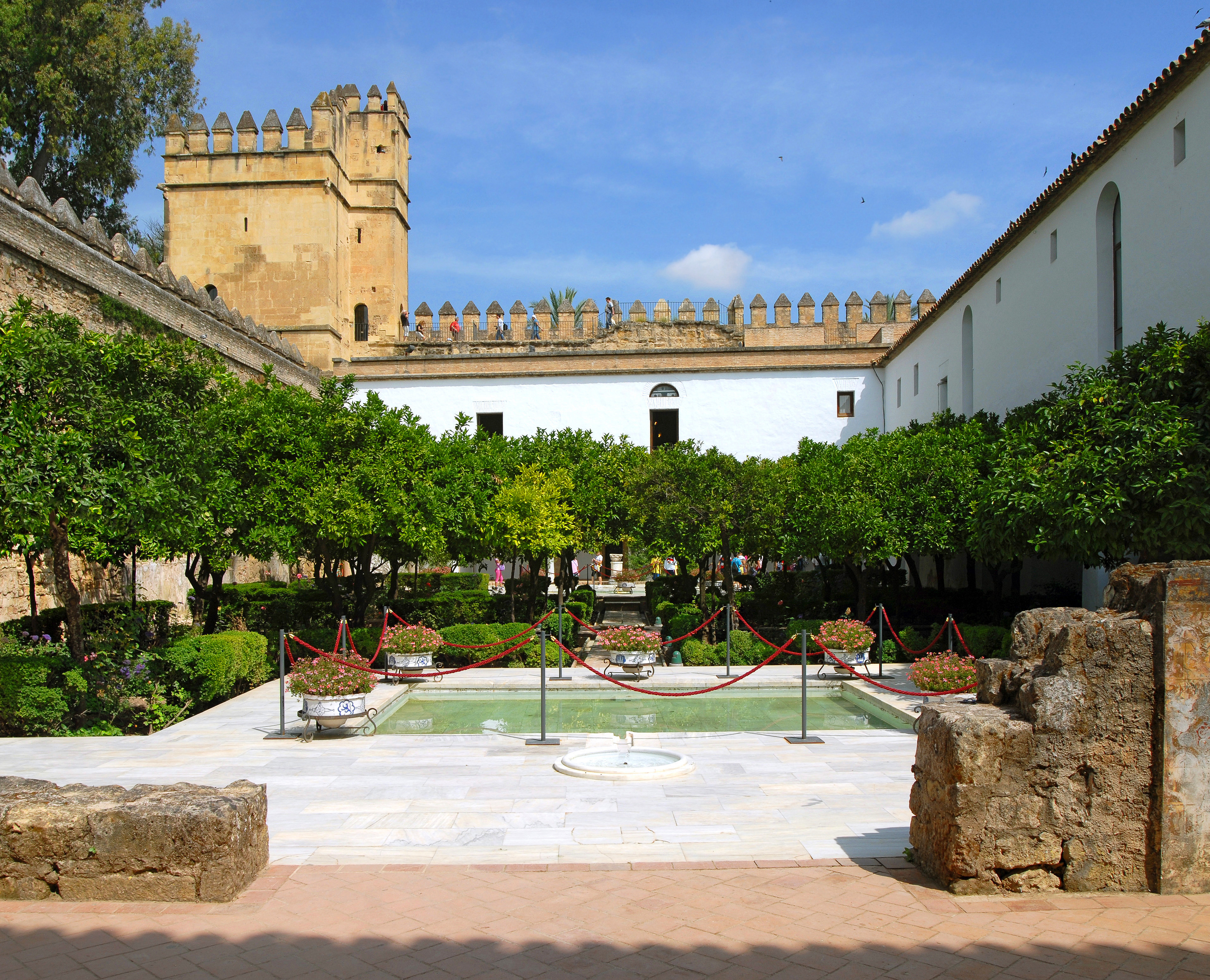
Alcázar gardens

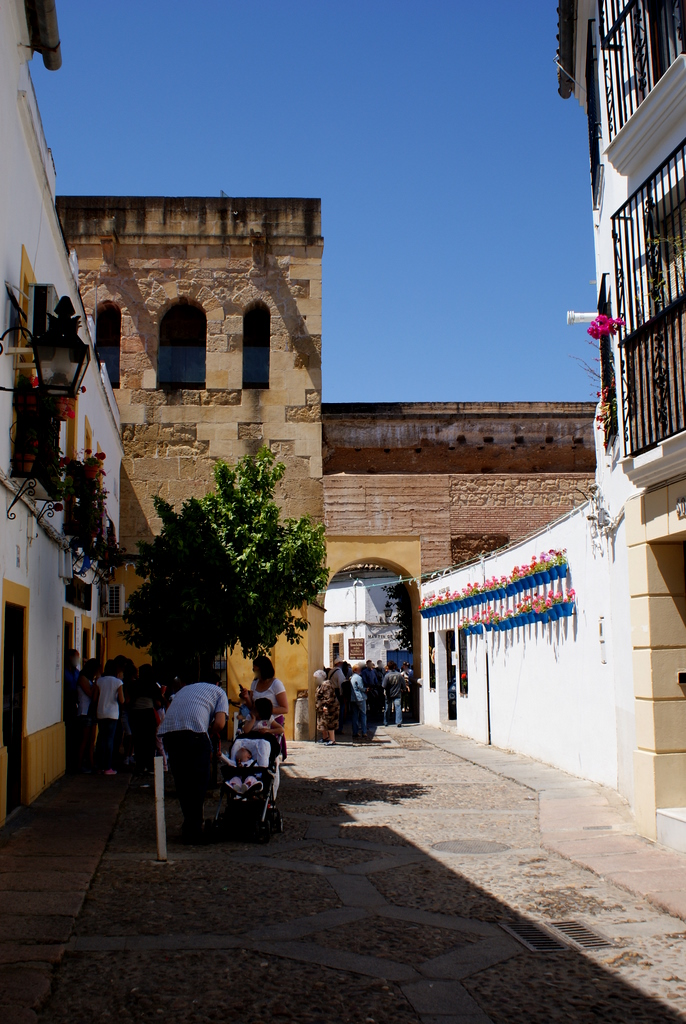
Torre de Belén

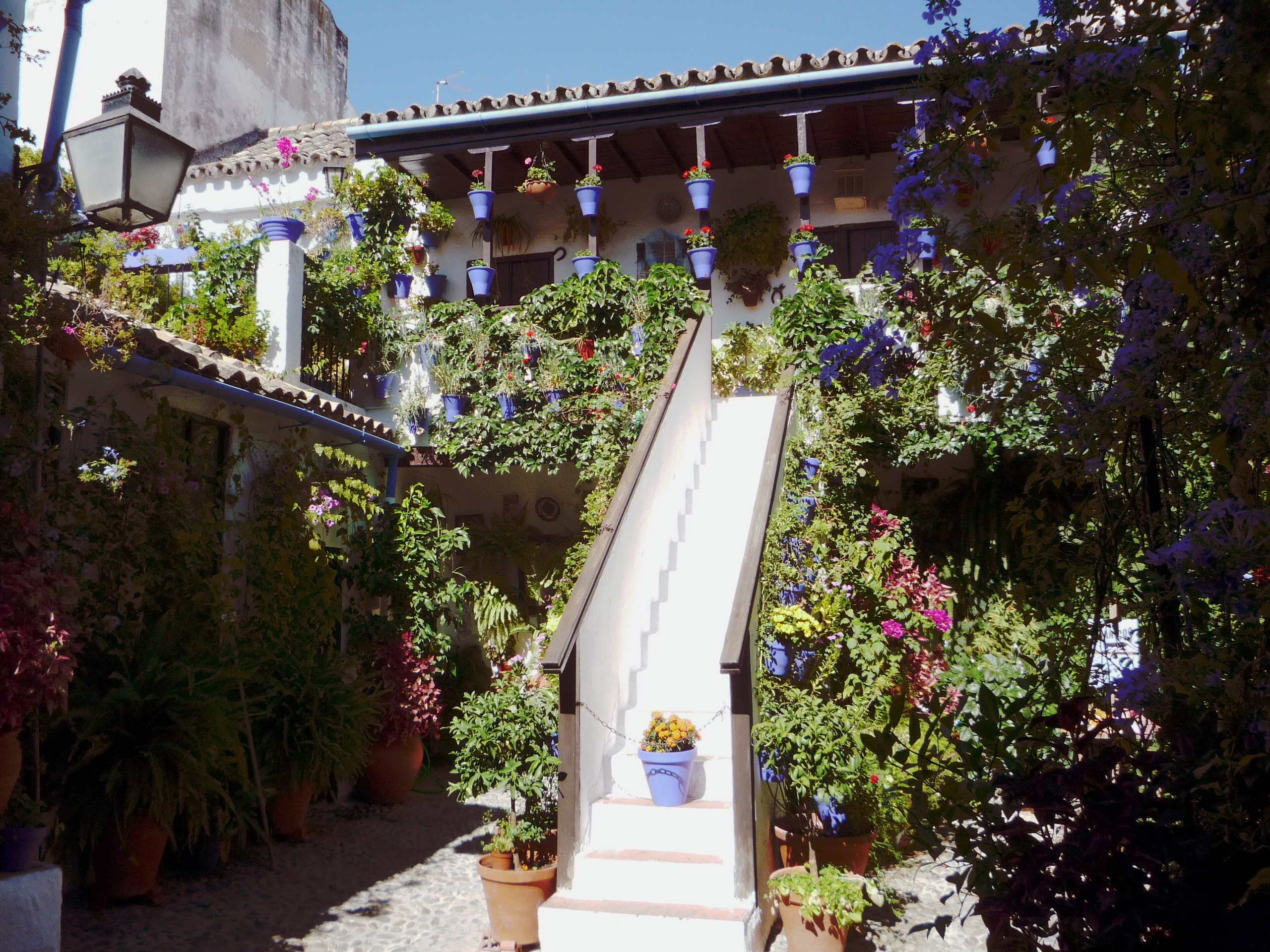
San Basilio patio

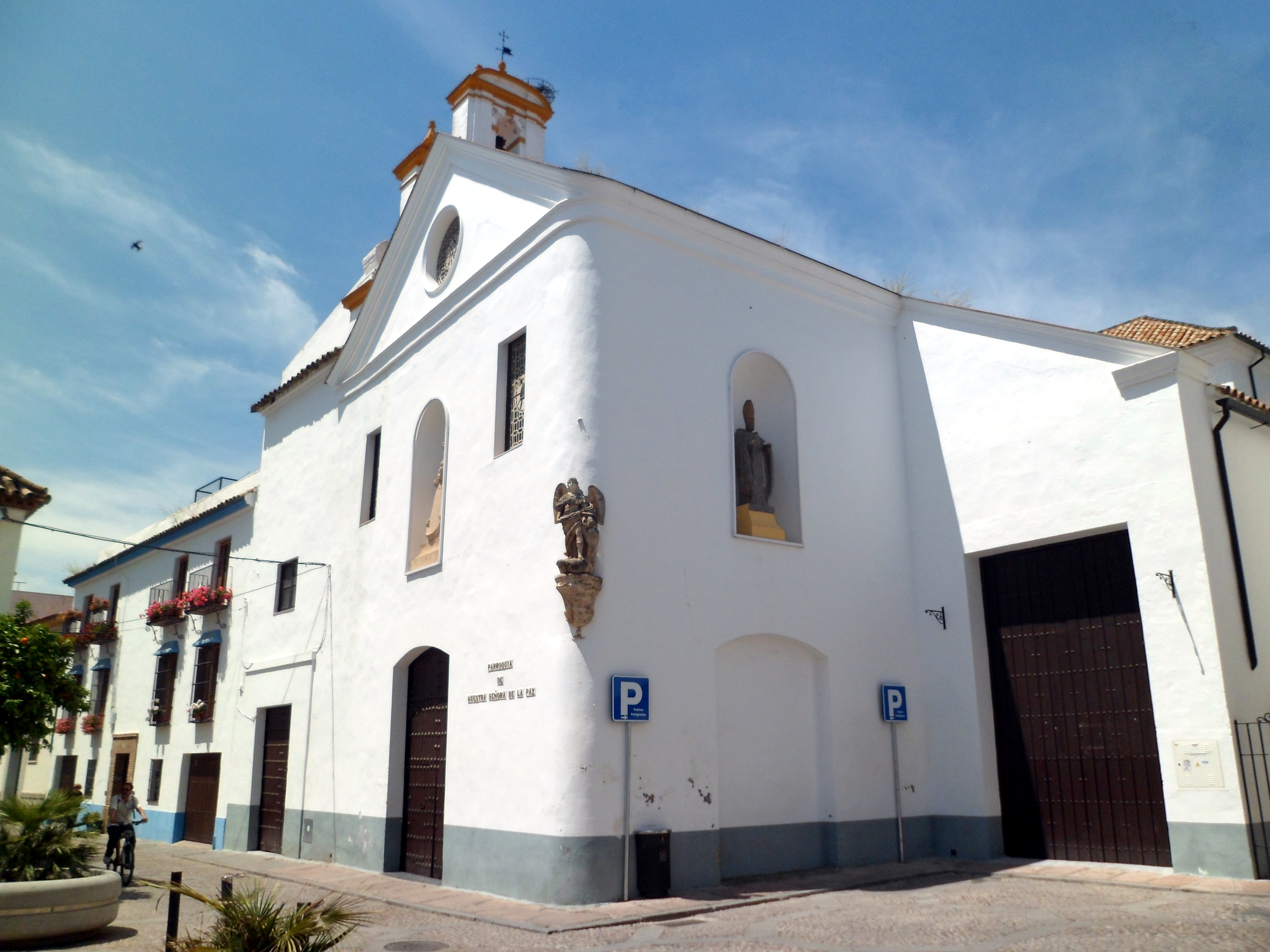
San Basilio Church

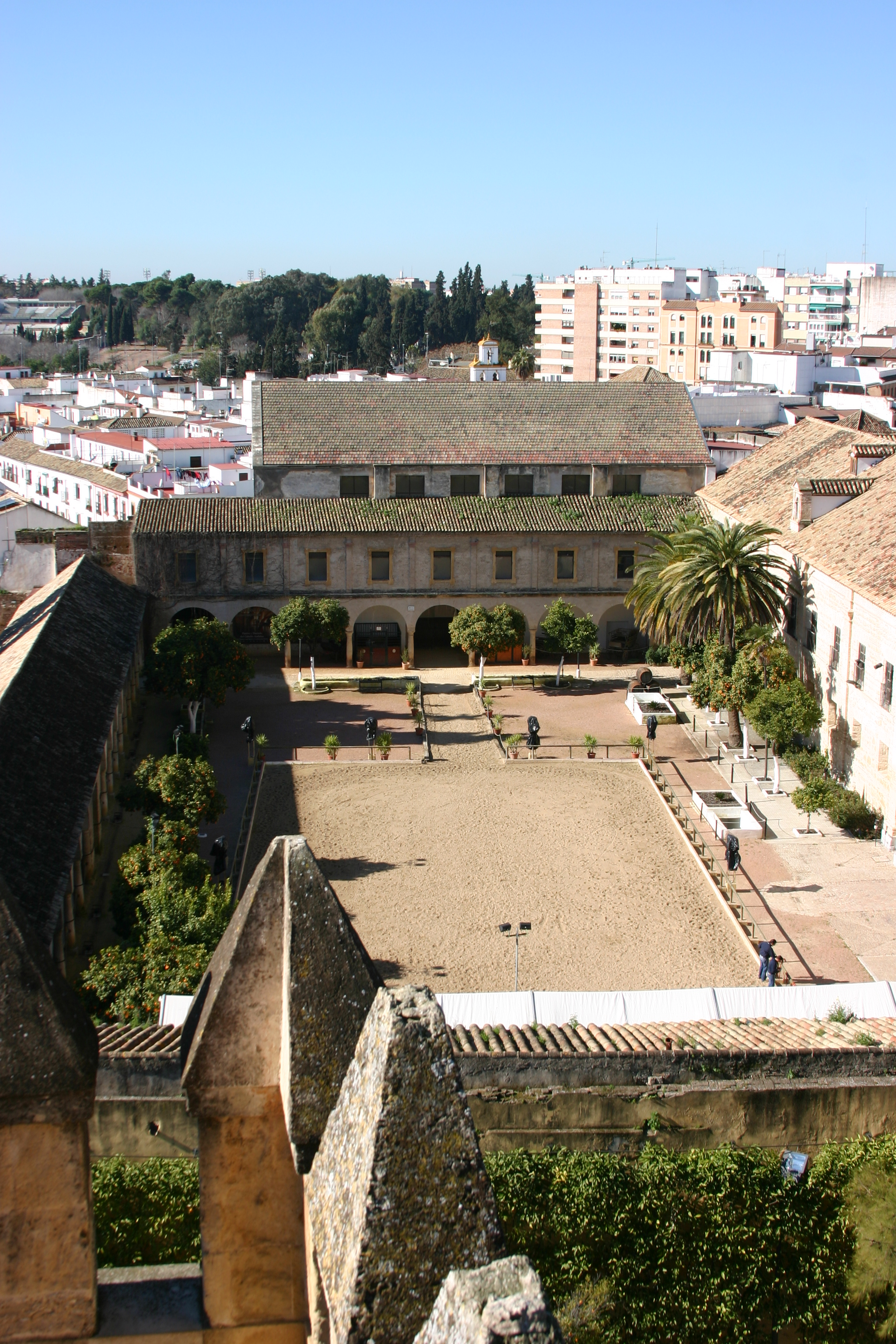
Royal Stables
