= Basilio Paraíso =

Spanish politician (1849–1930)

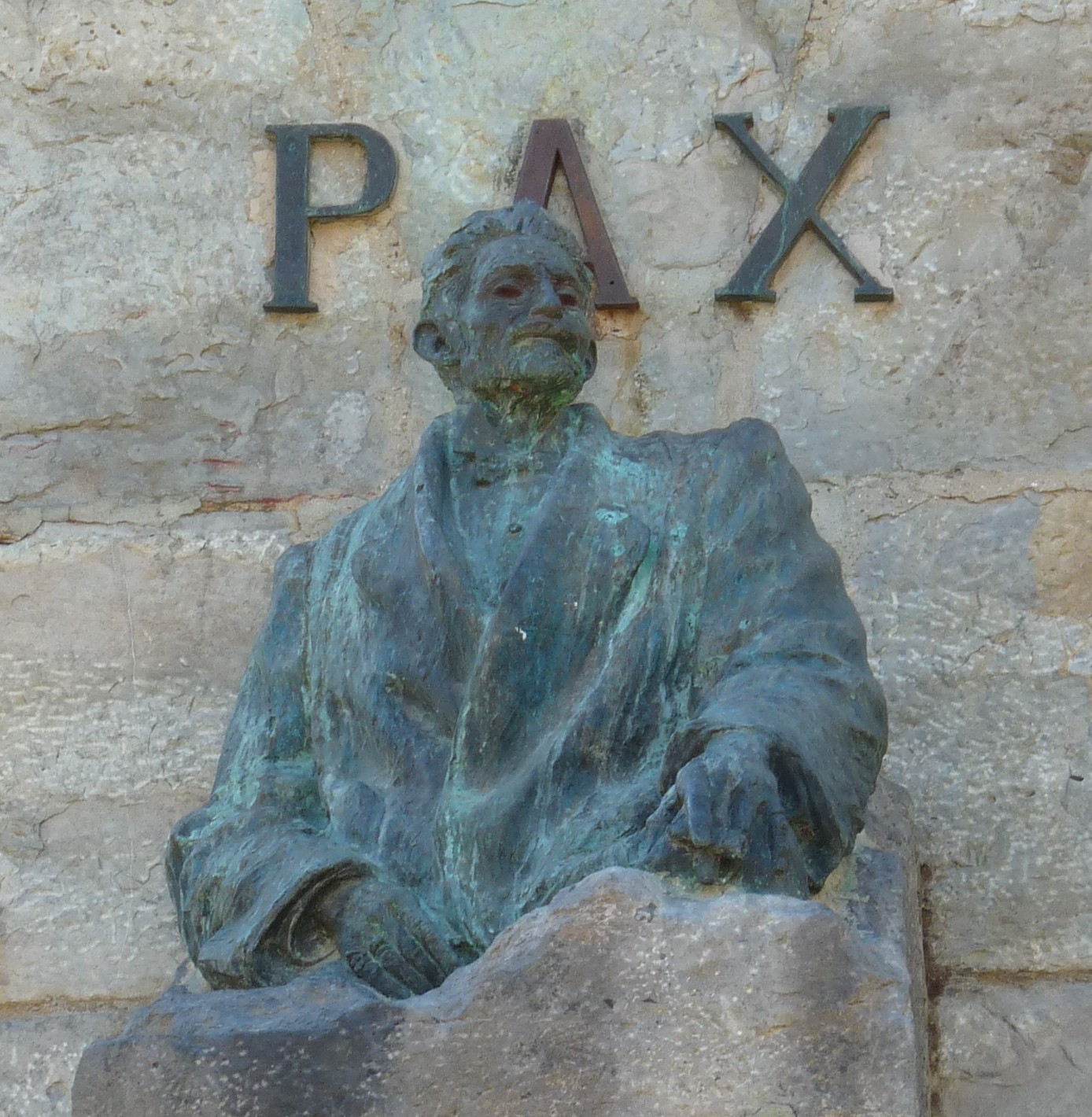
Bust of Paraíso on a monument built in 1910 by the brothers Miguel and Luciano Oslé, in commemoration of his work on the Hispano-French Exposition of 1908. Since 1951 in the Parque Grande in Zaragoza.

Basilio Paraíso (14 June 1849 in Laluenga, Huesca – 29 April 1930 in Madrid) was an Aragonese businessman and politician.

The son of a teacher, he studied in Huesca and Zaragoza, where he obtained a degree in medicine and began his career as a businessman.

He was the president of the Chamber of Commerce and Industry (1893–1919), founder of the editorial society of the Heraldo de Aragón (1898), member of the Congreso de los Diputados (1901) and senator-for-life. He also helped organize the Hispano-French Exposition of 1908.

In 1916 (in the middle of World War I), the Conde de Romanones named him president of the executive committee of the Central Board of Subsistencies, which regulated the production, the level and the price, of commerce, but he resigned in 1917 because of differences with the government that later elevated García Prieto to the same post.
