= Basilio Rodríguez Cañada =

Spanish writer and Africanist (born 1961)

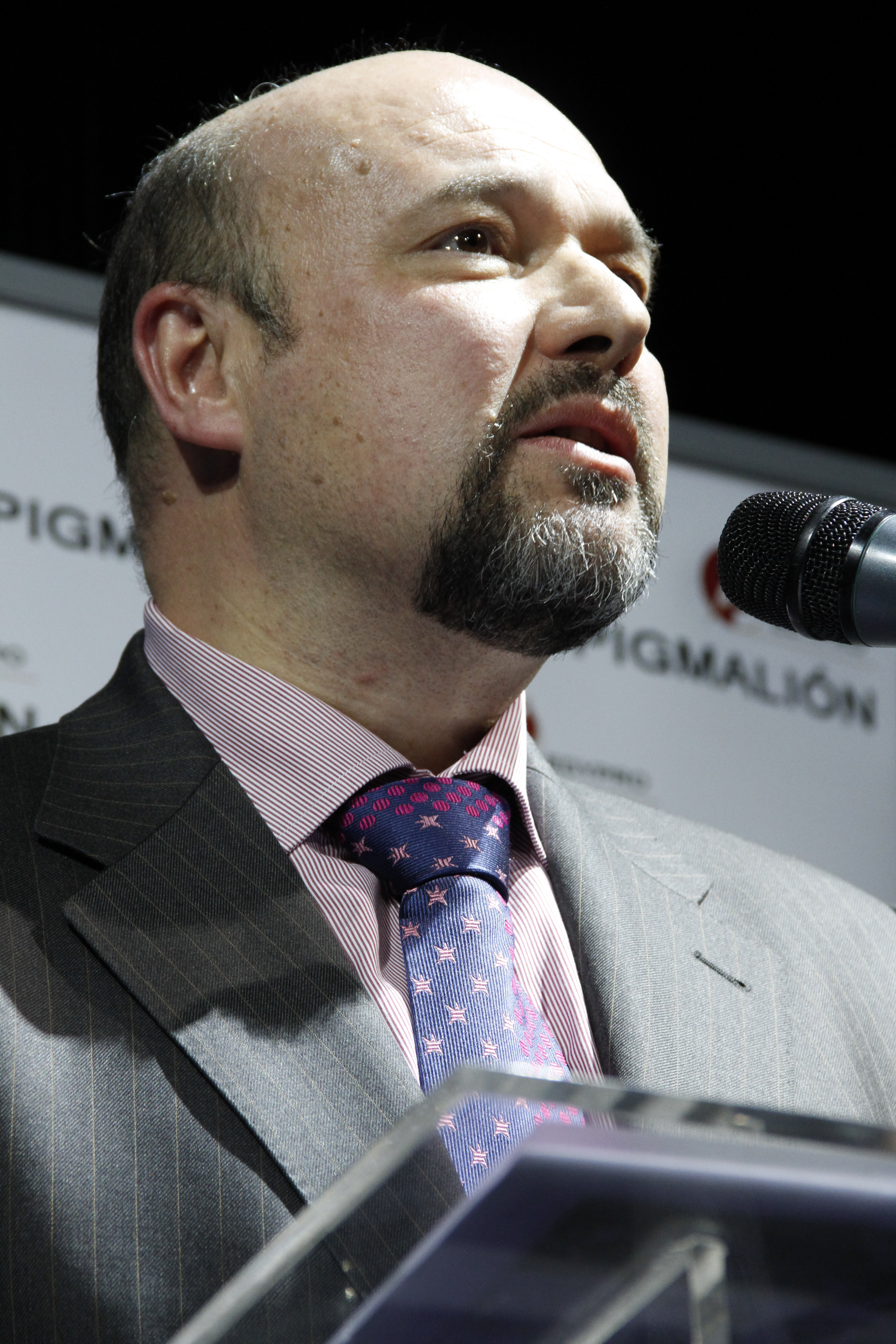
- Born: 1961 (age 64–65); Navalvillar de Pela, Badajoz (Spain)
- Education: Institución Jamer; Complutense University of Madrid
- Occupations: President of the Sial Pigmalión Publishing Group and the PEN Club of Spain
- Writing career
- Language: Spanish
- Notable awards: XXX Premio de Poesía González de Lama Premio Rafael García Plata de Poesía Galardón Aurelio Arturo de Poesía Premio Estrella de Oro a la Excelencia Profesional Premio Europeo a la Calidad Empresarial

Basilio Rodríguez Cañada (born in Navalvillar de Pela, Badajoz province in 1961) is a Spanish writer, editor, poet, professor, columnist, Africanist and cultural manager.

== Biography ==
Basilio Rodríguez Cañada was born in 1961, in the municipality of Navalvillar de Pela, in the province of Badajoz, which belongs to the autonomous community of Extremadura. He holds a degree in Communication Sciences from the Complutense University of Madrid.

From 1989 to 2003 Rodríguez Cañada was deputy director of the "Nuestra Señora de África" school, affiliated with the Complutense University of Madrid under the Ministry of Foreign Affairs. He was also founder and president of the "Association for the Joint Activities of the University Affiliated Schools of Madrid".

From 2001 to 2006 Rodríguez Cañada was a professor of Management and Communication at the Mississippi University Institution of Madrid, operated by the University of Southern Mississippi. He was a visiting professor at many different universities, and a regular lecturer at numerous national and international institutions.

He has collaborated with various newspapers and magazines: ABC, Leer, Estudios Africanos, Carácter, Turia, European Magazine, etc. He has also held several photography exhibitions and his works have been published in numerous specialized media outlets.

From 2005 to December 2007, he hosted the weekly multicast television program "Tiempo de tertulia".

From 2012 to 2015 he was president of the Spanish Association of Africanists, Spanish Section of the European Council for African Studies. He was a founder and is the current president of the PEN Club of Spain. He is also the president of Sial Pigmalión Publishing Group, founded in 1997.

In 2018 Rodríguez Cañada received the "Gold Star" award from the Institute for Professional Excellence (IEP), in recognition of his work and commitment to excellence.

In 2020, he received the European Award for Business Quality, awarded by the European Association for Economy and Competitiveness, in recognition of his career.

== Publications ==
His writing has won various literary awards and has been translated into Arabic, Italian, French, English, German, Portuguese, Greek, Russian, Galician and Catalan.

Poetry books:

- Las adolescentes (1986, 1996 y 1997)
- Acreedor de eternidades (1996 y 1997)
- Afluentes de la memoria (1997)
- La fuente de jade (1998)
- La llama azul (1999)
- Breve antología poética. 1983-2000 (2000)
- Amiga, amante, compañera (2001)
- País de sombras (2001)
- Viaje al alba (2005)
- La brisa y el simún. Poema dramático (2006)
- Hubo un tiempo (2008)
- Suma poética. 1983-2007 (2011)
- Sobre la piel del amor (2017)
- ¡Imagínate! Antología (2018)

Publications about his poetry:

- El imaginario poético de Basilio Rodríguez Cañada. Intimidades, itinerarios, remembranzas (2019)
- La piel de la poesía de Basilio Rodríguez Cañada (2019)

Other works:

- Poesía Ultimísima. 35 voces para abrir un milenio (1997)
- Milenio. Ultimísima Poesía Española. Antología (1997)
- Conflictos y cooperación en África actual (2000)
- El sueño de la pirámide (2012)

== See also ==
- Spanish literature
- Sial Pigmalión Publishing Group
