= Basilio Kaczurak =

Ukrainian musician (1919–1987)

- Kaczurak in March 1986

Background information
- Born: Василь Качурак; 7 February 1919; Kolomyia, Stanyslaviv, Ukrainian People's Republic
- Died: 7 February 1987 (aged 68) Buenos Aires, Argentina
- Genres: Folk, Classical
- Occupations: Composer, Kobzar, Bandurist, conductor, Director
- Instruments: Bandura, Kobza, Mandolin, hammered psaltery

Basilio Kaczurak (Ukrainian: Василь Качурак; 7 February 1919 – 7 February 1987) was a Ukrainian composer, bandurist, orchestra conductor, and promoter of Ukrainian folk music in South America. On June 6, 1961 in Argentina, he founded the Taras Shevchenko bandurist capella, which he directed for 25 years.

== Biography ==
Basilio Kaczurak promoted Ukrainian folk culture in South America, devoting his life to teaching and sharing the arts of his homeland to new generations.

Kaczurak promoted Ukrainian musical culture in South America with the partnership of Ukrainian artists around world, including Victor Mishalow. His bandurist capella, a vocal-instrumental group incorporating the Ukrainian stringed instrument the bandura, focused on preserving Ukrainian folk music.

In 2011, Kaczurak was recognized by the governments of Ukraine and Buenos Aires on the anniversary of the foundation of his capella with a special presentation at the ND Ateneo theater in Buenos Aires. The event was attended by international artists.

== Innovations ==
- In 1971, Kaczurak developed a technique to teach tones using colors in the bandura and other instruments such as the hammered psaltery

== Awards ==
- Order of Merit - City of Buenos Aires Government and the Ukrainian Embassy in Argentina, 2011
