= Ana Tereza Basilio =

Brazilian judge, lawyer

Ana Tereza Palhares Basílio

Alternate judge of the Rio de Janeiro Regional Electoral Court

Personal details
- Born: October 19, 1967 (age 58)
- Education: Universidade Cândido Mendes; University of Wisconsin–Madison
- Profession: Judge; Lawyer

Ana Tereza Palhares Basílio (born 19 October 1967) is a Brazilian judge and lawyer. She was appointed as the alternate judge of the Rio de Janeiro Regional Electoral Court by Brazilian president Dilma Rousseff.

== Education ==
Ana Basílio holds a Bachelor of Laws degree from Universidade Cândido Mendes in Rio de Janeiro and also holds a post-graduation degree of North American Law from the University of Wisconsin–Madison.

== Career ==
In 1990, Ana Basílio started her lawyer career working for a Brazilian law firm. She occupied the position of international partner of Baker & McKenzie. From 2006 to 2008, she was a partner of the law firm Andrade & Fichtner Advogados and in 2009, she opened her own law firm Basílio Advogados with four further partners.

From 2011 to 2013, she was the director for the Judicial Electoral School in Rio de Janeiro, which is directly related to the Presidency of Regional Electoral Court. She is responsible for guiding new directions in educating, updating and especiallizing judges, members of Public Electoral Ministry (MPE – Ministério Público Eleitoral), as well as public servants of the Regional Electoral Court (TRE) in Rio de Janeiro.

She was appointed as one of the key references in arbitration of Latin America by Chambers & Partners, in 2013, and named "Lawyer of the Year" by Global Awards 2012, in the categories of civil and labor litigation.

== Regional Electoral Court ==
Brazilian president Luiz Inácio Lula da Silva reappointed Ana Basiílio to the position of alternate judge of the Rio de Janeiro Regional Electoral Court in 2010.

Brazilian president Dilma Rousseff reappointed Ana Basiílio to the position of alternate judge of the Rio de Janeiro Regional Electoral Court in 2013.
