= Basilio Ah =

Belizean politician

- Born: San Antonio, Belize
- Occupation: Politician

Basilio Ah is a Belizean politician who served as a member of the United Democratic Party and member of the House of Representatives for the Toledo West constituency from 1984 to 1989.

== Background ==
Ah was born in Belize in San Antonio village. In the parliamentary elections in Belize of 1979, he won Toledo North Constituency with 49.3% of the vote against Juan Chun of the PUP. In the 1984 elections, he was re-elected in the Toledo West constituency, defeating Vicente Choco of the PUP with 48.7% of the vote. He retired in 1979 at the age of 30.

== Bibliography ==
- Belize Elections and Boundaries Commission. elections.gov.bz.
