= Sial Pigmalión Publishing Group =

Sial Pigmalion Publishing Group
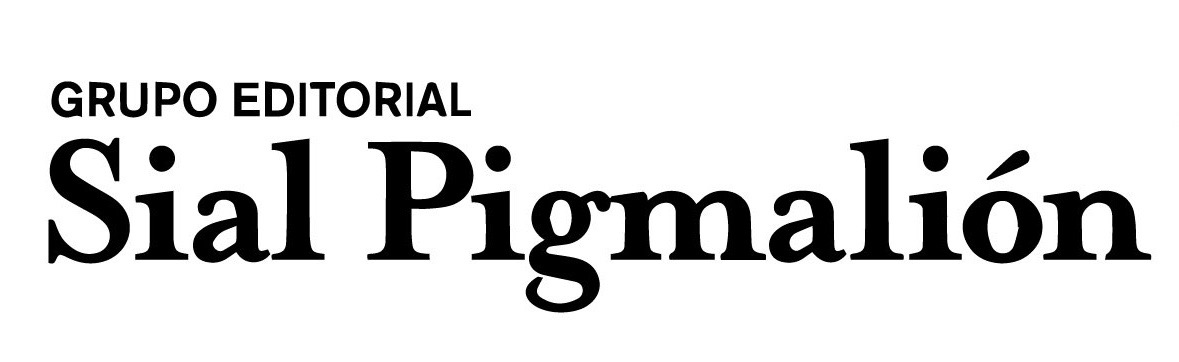
- Founders: Basilio Rodríguez Cañada; José Ramón Trujillo
- Country of origin: Spain
- Headquarters location: Madrid, Spain
- Distribution: Spain and Latin America
- Official website: www.sialpigmalion.es

The Sial Pigmalión Publishing Group is a Spanish publisher founded in 1997 based in Madrid.

== History and characteristics ==
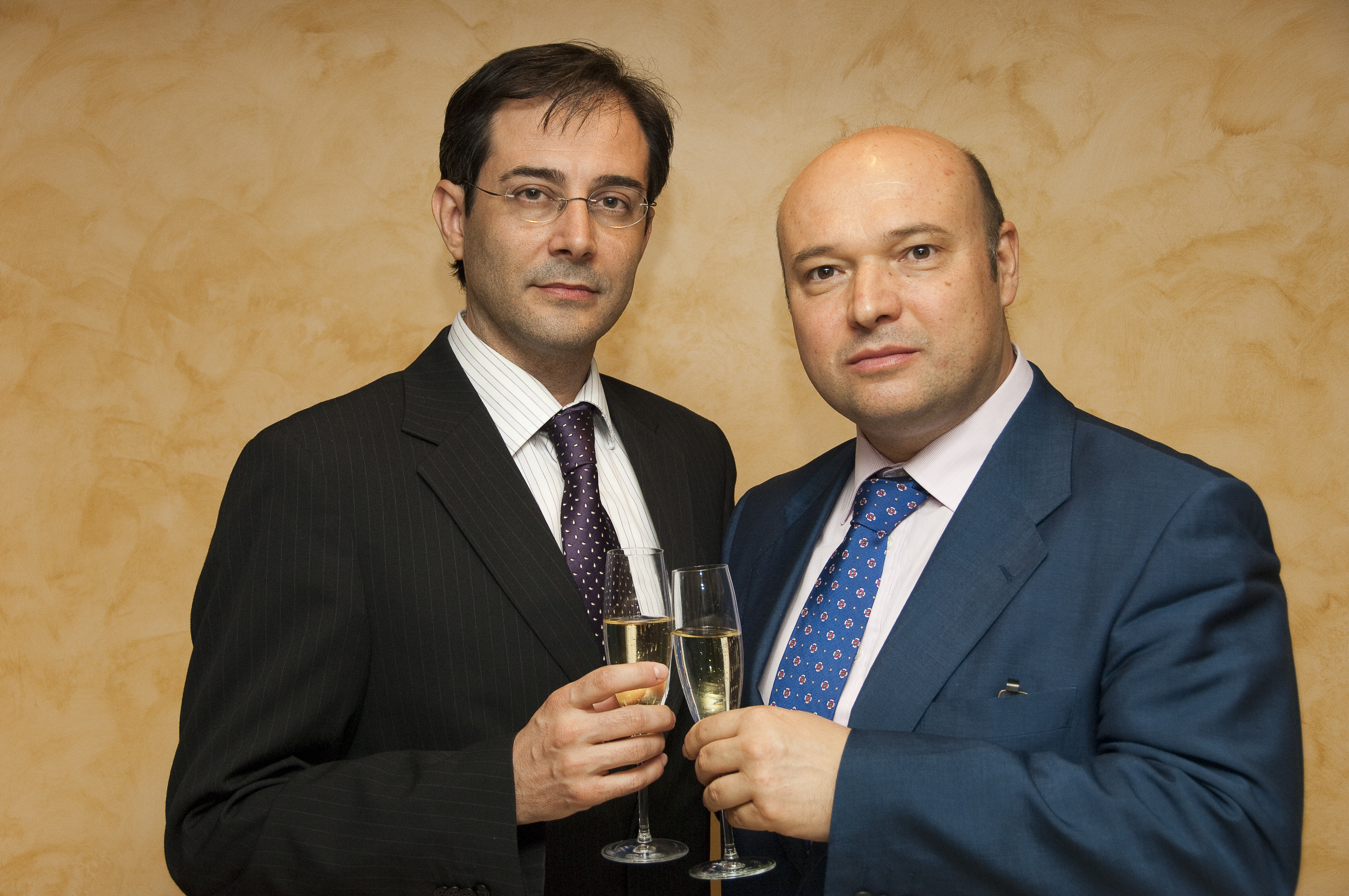
José Ramón Trujillo and Basilio Rodríguez Cañada, co-founders of the Sial Pigmalión Publishing Group

The Sial Pigmalión Publishing Group was founded in 1997 in Madrid by the writer, editor and professor Basilio Rodríguez Cañada, former president of the Spanish Association of Africanists and current president of the PEN Club of Spain, and José Ramón Trujillo, professor of the Autonomous University of Madrid. The group, comprised by the publishers Sial Ediciones and Pigmalión Edypro, works with "cultural communication, event organization, and the edition of works of narrative, poetry, essay, theater, literary criticism, university, cinema, and children's books" according to its website.

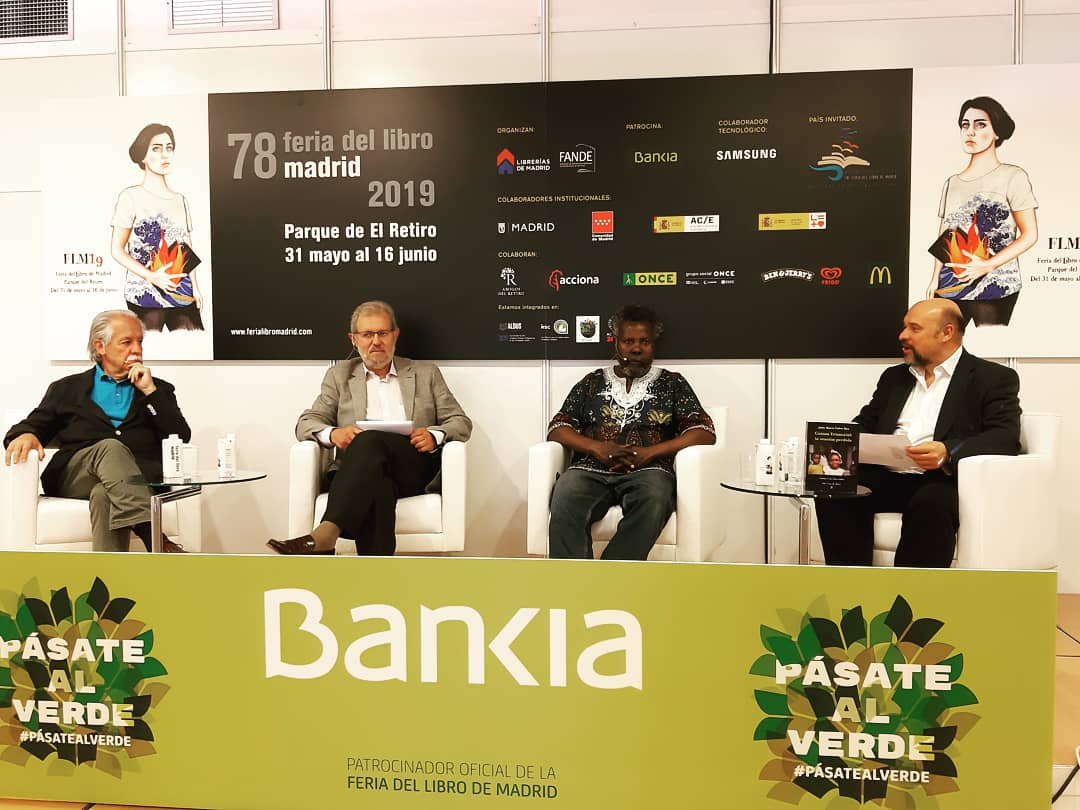
Members of the Sial Pigmalion Publishing Group at the 78th Madrid Book Fair

Every year the publishing house awards numerous literature prizes, among them the "Gustavo Adolfo Bécquer" International Literature Prize, "Rubén Darío" International Literature Prize, "Justo Bolekia Boleká" International African Literature Prize, Sial Pigmalión Awards for Narrative, poetry, Thought and Essay, "Virginia Woolf" International Prize, "Lord Byron" International Young Literature Prize, "Anaïs Nin" International Erotic Literature Prize, "Esquilo" International Theater Prize, and the Escriduende Awards.

Outside of Spain, the Sial Pigmalión Publishing Group has strong ties with Africa and Latin America, with distribution in Colombia and authors from many countries in the two regions.

Sial Pigmalión has carried out various cooperation, development and cultural dissemination projects in countries such as Equatorial Guinea, Morocco, Germany, Tunisia, Philippines, Colombia, Spain, etc. In April 2015, the publisher delivered 1,650 books, valued at 35,000 euros, to the Spanish departments of six universities in Cairo, Egypt with the aim of "promoting Spanish cultural cooperation".

== Collections ==
- Casa de África
- Trivium
- Prosa Barroca
- Contrapunto
- Candilejas
- Sial Narrativa
- Pigmalión Narrativa
- Fugger Libros
- Ex Libris
- Sial Silos
- Litecom
- Lumiére
- El Basilisco
- Extremadura
- Eros
- Magíster

== Awards ==
In 2018, the Sial Pigmalión Publishing Group received the "Gold Star" award from the Institute for Professional Excellence. Two years later the group received the European Award for Business Quality granted by the European Association of Economy and Competition.
