= USS Bermuda =

Cargo ship of the United States Navy

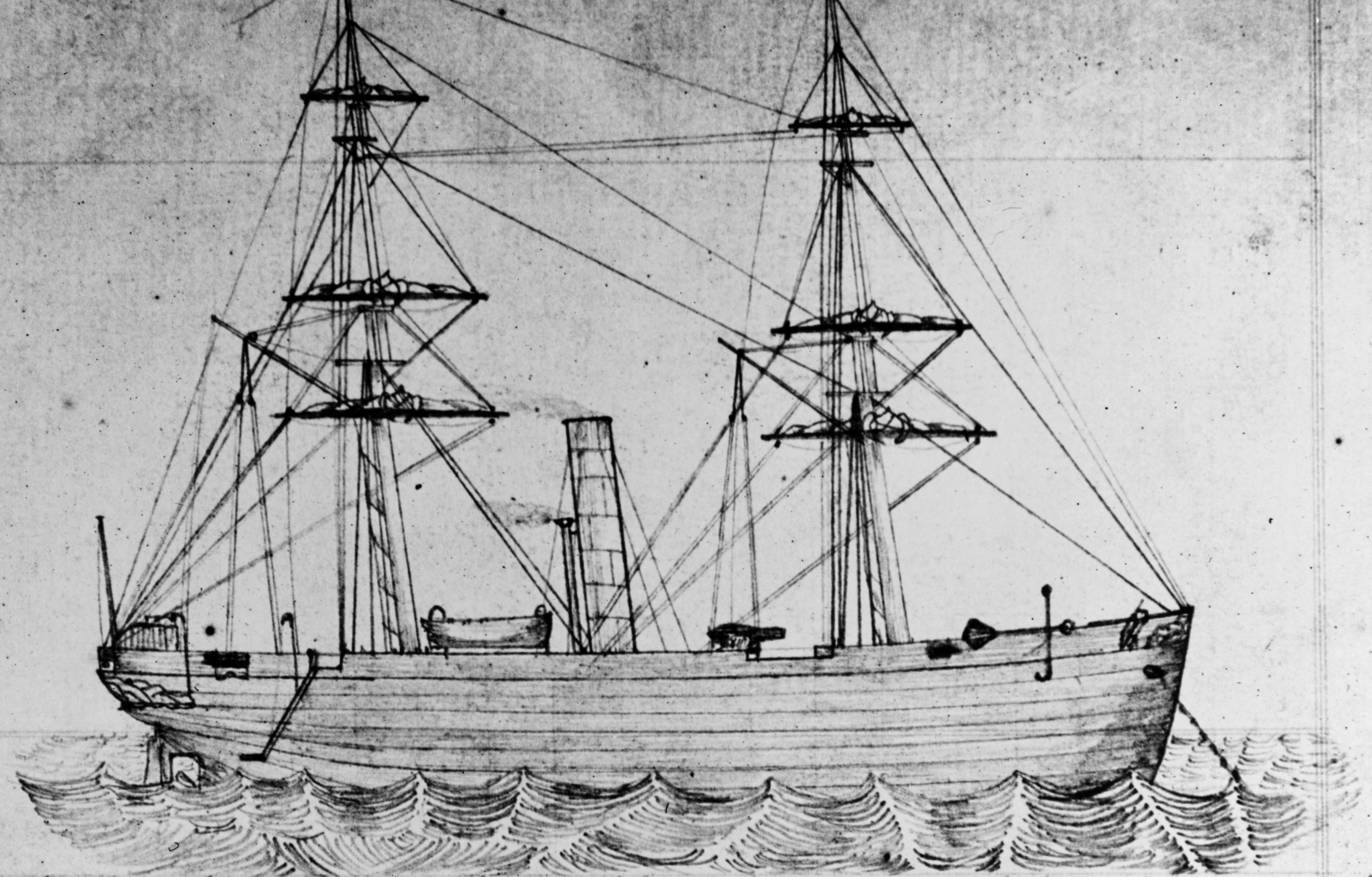
- USS Bermuda at Mobile, Alabama, September 1863

History

United States
- Launched: 1861
- Acquired: circa March 5, 1863
- Commissioned: May 13, 1863
- Decommissioned: September 22, 1865
- Fate: sold, September 22, 1865

General characteristics
- Displacement: 1,238 tons
- Length: 211 ft (64 m)
- Beam: 21 ft 7 in (6.58 m)
- Draft: 16 ft 8 in (5.08 m)
- Depth of hold: 21 ft 2 in (6.45 m)
- Propulsion: steam engine; screw-propelled
- Speed: 11 knots (20 km/h; 13 mph)
- Complement: 122
- Armament: one 9" smoothbore gun; two 30-pounder Parrott rifles

USS Bermuda was a large steamer captured by the Union Navy during the American Civil War. She was used by the Union Navy as a cargo and general transport ship in support of the Union Navy blockade of Confederate waterways, primarily in Florida and the Gulf of Mexico. However, despite being a valuable cargo ship, she proved very adept at capturing blockade runners as her record proves.

== Confederate blockade runner ==
Bermuda—an iron-hulled screw steamer—was built in 1861 at Stockton-on-Tees, England, by Pearse and Lockwood to take advantage of the extraordinary profits which could be made by running cargoes of war-making materiel through the Union blockade to the munitions-hungry Confederacy. Originally owned by Edwin Haigh, a Liverpool cotton broker, the ship was secretly sold—about the time of her completion—to Messrs. A. S. Henckle and George Alfred Trenholme of Charleston, South Carolina.

While her new owner, Charles K. Prioleau, hoped to realize a profit from operating the steamer, he evinced even more interest in proving the Federal blockade of the South ineffective and therefore non-binding in international law. By proving the Union Navy's efforts to close Southern ports only a "paper blockade," they would prompt other investors to follow their example and thus assure the South a steady flow of supplies to sustain its struggle for independence. Bermuda was then chartered to Frasier Trenholme and Co., a British corporation that served the Confederate government as its commercial and financial agent in the British Isles.

Soon after she was launched, probably in late July or early August 1861, Bermuda—Eugene L. Tessier, master—dropped down the Tees River to West Hartlepool where she loaded the first cargo purchased in England by agents of the Confederate War Department. She departed West Hartlepool on August 18, proceeded south along England's North Sea coast, transited the Strait of Dover, and steamed the length of the English Channel to Falmouth, Cornwall, where she arrived on the morning of the 22d.

She topped off her coal bunkers there and resumed her westward voyage, leaving above her wake a cloud of false rumors intended to cloak her destination and the true nature of her mission. Some said that she was a supply ship taking provisions and munitions to the Royal Navy; others that she was carrying a general cargo to Cuba. Still others identified her as a merchantman bound for one of the British colonies. While these cover stories did not mislead Federal agents in the British Isles, they did succeed in preventing Bermuda's being held in port for violating the United Kingdom's Foreign Enlistment Act.

After crossing the Atlantic Ocean under British colors, Bermuda took advantage of a severe storm that had forced the blockading Union frigate Savannah out to sea and slipped into Savannah, Georgia, where she delivered a million-dollar cargo of war material. She then filled her holds with some 2,000 bales of cotton that she hoped to deliver in England to support Confederate credit abroad. The steamer departed Savannah on the night of November 1, 1861 and slipped through the Union blockade before dawn the next morning. After pausing at Bermuda and at Le Havre, France, en route, she reached Liverpool, England, on January 23, 1862.

Bermuda, and vessels like her, had been "fitted out in English ports, laden with arms, munitions, and contraband of war, clearing with British papers and sailing under the English flag…destined for…the insurrectionary regions of our country with supplies for the rebels," Secretary of the Navy Gideon Welles had written on December 1, 1861, an "abuse [that] must be corrected and this traffic stopped." Since Bermuda's maiden voyage, the Union Navy had acquired many ships and tightened the blockade to implement Welles' directives.

It had done so so effectively that only very fast, shallow draft vessels stood much chance of slipping through. Given Bermuda's comparatively slow speed and almost 17-foot draft, her owners opted to decide that rather than risk capture by attempting another run to a Confederate port, they would discharge her cargo at Bermuda for reloading into smaller and speedier ships for the final leg of its journey.

Under Charles W. Westendorff, a native of Charleston, Bermuda put to sea again on or near February 18, 1862 and set course for Bermuda where she arrived sometime before March 24. British authorities, however, refused to permit her to unload the gunpowder that filled her holds. Protracted efforts having failed to persuade these officials to permit the ship to land her ordnance cargo, Bermuda stood out for Nassau, Bahamas, on April 22 where a cargo of cotton lay awaiting her for the voyage back to Liverpool.

== Capture ==
On the morning of the 27th, however, as Bermuda approached Great Abaco Island, the Union screw steamer Mercedita, cruising off the Providence Channel as part of the East Division, Gulf Blockading Squadron, fell in with her and gave chase. At a point somewhere between three and seven miles northeast of the Hole-in-the-Wall Light, a shot across her bow brought Bermuda to. The ensuing boarding party not only found discrepancies in the cargo manifests, but about a thousand tons of contraband cargo, including:

a battery of 7 fieldpieces (rifled), with carriages and everything complete, a number of heavier rifled cannon, 42,720 pounds of powder in barrels, and one-half and one-fourth barrels; 70 barrels of cartridges, over 600 cases of shells, etc…

Since the ship's log yielded the information that she had "run the blockade before" and her captain admitted that her cargo was "intended finally to reach the rebel States," Comdr. Henry S. Stellwagen, Mercedita's commanding officer, seized Bermuda and sent her to Philadelphia under Lt. Trevett Abbot and a 30-man prize crew. Part of the cargo that was seized was a substantial shipment of blank paper sheets that were intended for the printing of Confederate currency. Made in England, the paper was watermarked CSA. Transferred to Philadelphia, the paper eventually became the property of the Currency Bureau (precursor to the Bureau of Engraving and Printing). The Currency bureau used the paper for the printing of specimen notes of fractional currency and so specimen notes exist with the CSA watermark, including the notes on the Fractional currency shield. Sheets and partial sheets of the blank paper are known to exist. This seizure was by far the most important of the entire cargo.

After arriving at that port on 3 May, the ship was arraigned before the United States District Court at Philadelphia. Proceedings began on August 12 and the concluding arguments were heard four days later. However, the court did not condemn the steamer until March 5, 1863, almost a year after her capture. The vessel was then purchased by the Union Navy and fitted out at the Philadelphia Navy Yard for service as a supply vessel.

Commissioned on May 13, 1863, Acting Master J. W. Smith in command, Bermuda headed down the Delaware River later that day with a cargo of supplies for the two blockading squadrons operating in the Gulf of Mexico. Eight days later, she arrived at the mouth of Florida's Indian River where she issued supplies to the bark Gem of the Sea on blockade duty there.

This began more than two years of service in which she brought the provisions that enabled Federal warships to remain on guard off Confederate ports. During this period, she made 16 round-trip voyages to the gulf during most of which she concentrated her efforts on filling the needs of Rear Admiral David G. Farragut's West Gulf Blockading Squadron. Besides issuing stores, she usually also carried passengers—officers and men going to and from blockade duty, sick sailors who were returning north to recuperate, and prisoners who had been captured afloat or ashore. On return passages, she frequently had on board cotton from the holds of blockade runners that had been taken while attempting escape to sea.

During her first voyage, after filling the needs of Gem of the Sea, she embarked three prisoners from that bark and proceeded on to Key West, Florida, where she arrived on 23 May and discharged ordnance and supplies. Three days later, she began issuing stores at Tampa Bay and then moved farther north along Florida's gulf coast to St. Marks, Florida, where she arrived on the 29th. The last day of May found the steamer issuing stores at St. Andrew's Bay; and, on June 1, she rendered similar service at Pensacola, Florida.

She provisioned the fleet off Mobile Bay the next day, stood out to sea on the 3d, and entered the Mississippi River on the 4th. Following more than a week at Quarantine, she reached New Orleans, Louisiana, on the 13th. Two days later, she descended the river and stood out to sea for a run to Rear Admiral David Farragut's ships off Galveston, Texas, which she reached on the 17th. Beginning her long homeward voyage the next day, Bermuda retraced her outward path, stopping again at New Orleans, off Mobile Bay, and at Pensacola. At the latter port, she received on board 36 seamen and 42 bales of cotton for the journey north. She got underway again on June 26, passed Cedar Keys on the 29th, and unloaded all remaining stores at Key West on July 1. The next day, she took the American schooner Ascension in tow and sailed for Port Royal, South Carolina. She delivered her charge at that port on the 5th and then pushed on up the Atlantic coast. After brief stops at Hampton Roads, Virginia, and at Newport News, Virginia, the steamer reached Portsmouth, New Hampshire, on the 12th. Bermuda headed south two days later and entered the Delaware River early on the 18th. Reaching the Philadelphia Navy Yard later that day, the ship soon began undergoing brief repairs, took on stores and ordnance on the 24th and, the following day, dropped down stream and put to sea for her next trip to the gulf.

Bermuda's subsequent voyages south were, for the most part, much like her first except that they usually took her farther west and south along the coast of Texas, occasionally all the way to the Mexican border at the mouth of the Rio Grande. Besides carrying out her prosaic but vital logistical mission for the Union Navy, Bermuda kept a sharp lookout for any vessel that might be attempting to slip into or to escape from an inlet along the Confederate coast. More than once, her vigilance paid rich dividends.

About mid-day on August 14, 1863—while steaming from Brownsville, Texas, toward Galveston, Texas, during her second voyage under the Stars and Stripes -- Bermuda sighted an unidentified sail some 138 miles from Matamoras, Mexico, and steering toward Matagorda, Texas. The Union supply ship overtook and boarded the stranger at 3:20 p.m. and learned that she was the British schooner Artist of Nassau, Bahamas, that had purportedly quit Havana, Cuba, for Matamoras. Members of her crew tried to justify their vessel's compromising course and position by claiming that their captain had died of yellow fever and that no other navigator was on board. The fact that the schooner's chronometer was wound, however, and that her sextant was set at the correct meridian altitude for that date belied that explanation for her being so far off course. As a result, Smith seized the small ship—with her cargo of liquors, wines, medicines, and other varied commodities—as a lawful prize.

That evening, a lookout in Bermuda spotted another sail to the north; and the steamer changed course to pursue this new stranger. Some four hours later, she overhauled the chase; "...found her to be the British schooner Carmita, from Velasco, Texas..." bound for Balize, Honduras, with a cargo of cotton; and sent her to Key West, Florida, under a prize crew.

On her next cruise to the gulf, she again found good hunting in the waters off the Texas coast. At 8:10 on the morning of October 2, 1863, Bermuda fired a gun across a schooner's bow, prompting her to heave to about six miles off Matagorda. The vessel proved to be the English Florie, purportedly bound from New Orleans, Louisiana, to Matamoras. Her master "...pretended that he did not know his position and thought he was 80 miles from land." Smith took the schooner and sent her to New Orleans under a prize crew for adjudication. The main items in her assorted cargo were medicine, wine, and saddles much needed by the Confederate cavalry.

On her next cruise, while standing out of Pensacola, Florida, on the afternoon of November 19, 1863, Bermuda saw three schooners in company with a large lugger apparently heading toward that port. As the Union supply ship approached, the strangers separated. Smith stopped the nearest by a shell across her bow, and she proved to be the Venice of New Orleans which was heading for Pensacola, Florida, under charter by the Union Army. Her master explained that the other schooners, Norman and Mary Campbell, also were supposed to be heading for Pensacola under similar charters. He added that he, too, was puzzled by the latter's having changed course to seaward.

Sensing something amiss, Smith gave chase and, after a four-hour pursuit in which he fired seven shells at his quarry, overtook and boarded Mary Campbell. He learned that earlier that day, presumably before daylight since no member of Venice's crew had observed the action, a Confederate raiding party of 16 men under Acting Master James Duke, CSN, had captured Mary Campbell and Norman and probably entertained covetous designs upon Venice when Bermuda hove into view. Duke—already notorious because of earlier captures of Union vessels—fled toward land in Norman with 10 members of the lugger's crew and, after running that schooner aground and setting her afire, escaped ashore. Smith returned Mary Campbell to her original master and crew and permitted them to complete their original voyage to Pensacola.

On Bermuda's seventh cruise to the gulf, she encountered a sloop off the Atlantic coast of Florida and, after a brief pursuit, brought the stranger to with a shot across her bow. The chase proved to be the sloop Fortunate that had recently emerged from Indian River Inlet laden with cotton and turpentine. Smith transferred the cargo to his own ship, took the prize in tow, and resumed his course toward Port Royal. However, the sloop began taking on water, parted the towline, and sank some four hours later. Two days later, Bermuda retrieved a large quantity of floating cotton bales undoubtedly jettisoned by some blockade runner attempting to escape a pursuer.

Bermuda continued shuttling between Philadelphia and the gulf through the end of the Civil War and most of the ensuing summer. She returned north from her last cruise—in which she went no farther than Key West—on September 16, 1865.

== Decommissioning and sale ==
Bermuda was decommissioned at the Philadelphia Navy Yard on September 22, 1865. She was sold at public auction on the same day, to Samuel C. Cook. Under the names General Meade and Bahamas, she saw merchant service until February 10, 1882, when she foundered in a storm while en route from Puerto Rico to New York City.
