= Fractional currency shield =

Framed sets of United States fractional currency

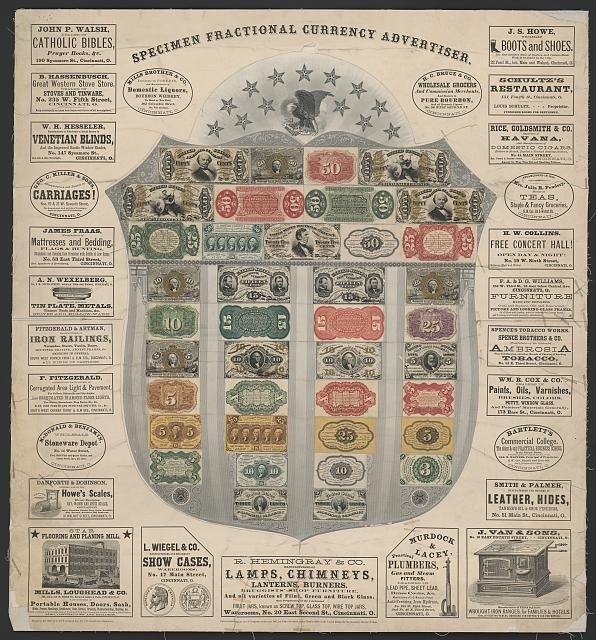

A fractional currency shield is a 20 in × 25 in (510 mm × 640 mm) printed "shield" on which were placed images of 39 different fractional currency notes. Produced in 1866 and 1867 by the United States Treasury Department, the shields were sold to banks for $4.50 each, for the purpose of having images of genuine notes available for use in detecting counterfeits. The 39 notes were printed from the original plates on one side only, the other side left blank, or with the printed word "specimen".

The shields were typically framed by the purchaser and hung on the wall for the convenience of bank employees. Sales were reported to be $14,683.50. Notes appearing on the shields were from the first, second and third issues of Fractional Currency, of the five different issues made. The printed shield portion exists in three colors, grey (the most common), pink and green. Many Specimen notes of the second and third fractional issue are printed on captured Confederate paper that was taken in 1862 by the Union ship Mercedita from the Confederate blockade runner Bermuda (later, USS Bermuda). The paper was subsequently taken to Philadelphia and sold by the US Government. The paper, produced in Great Britain was watermarked CSA (Confederate States America), and originally due to be printed as Confederate paper notes. Many of the specimen notes contain a partial, or complete imprints of the watermark. Examples of the blank paper, with the CSA watermark in full and half sheets exist. Many individual specimen notes (printed on one side only) exist after being removed from shields.
