= Shinplaster =

Paper money of low denomination

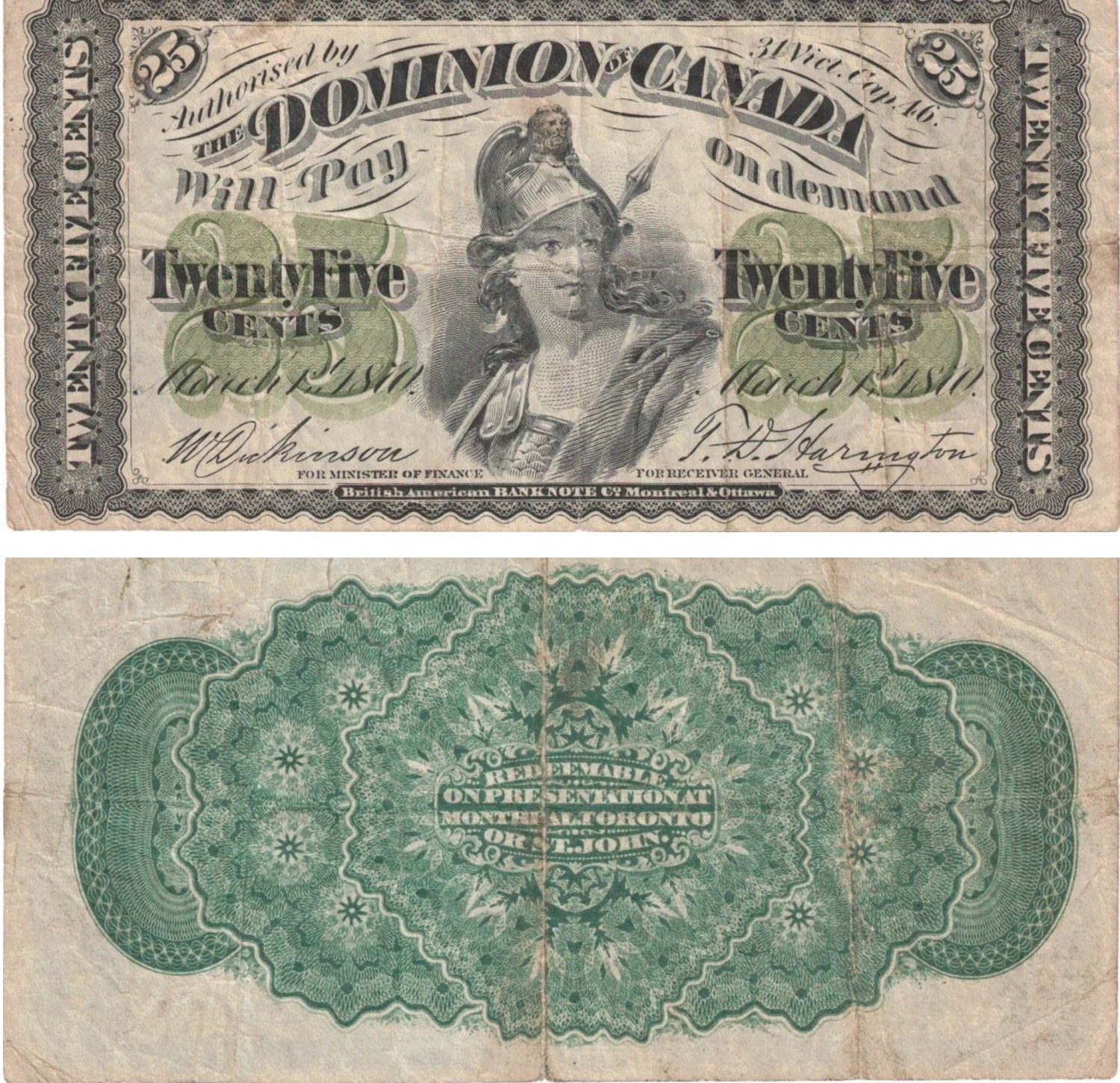
Canadian 25¢ "shinplaster", front and back (1870)

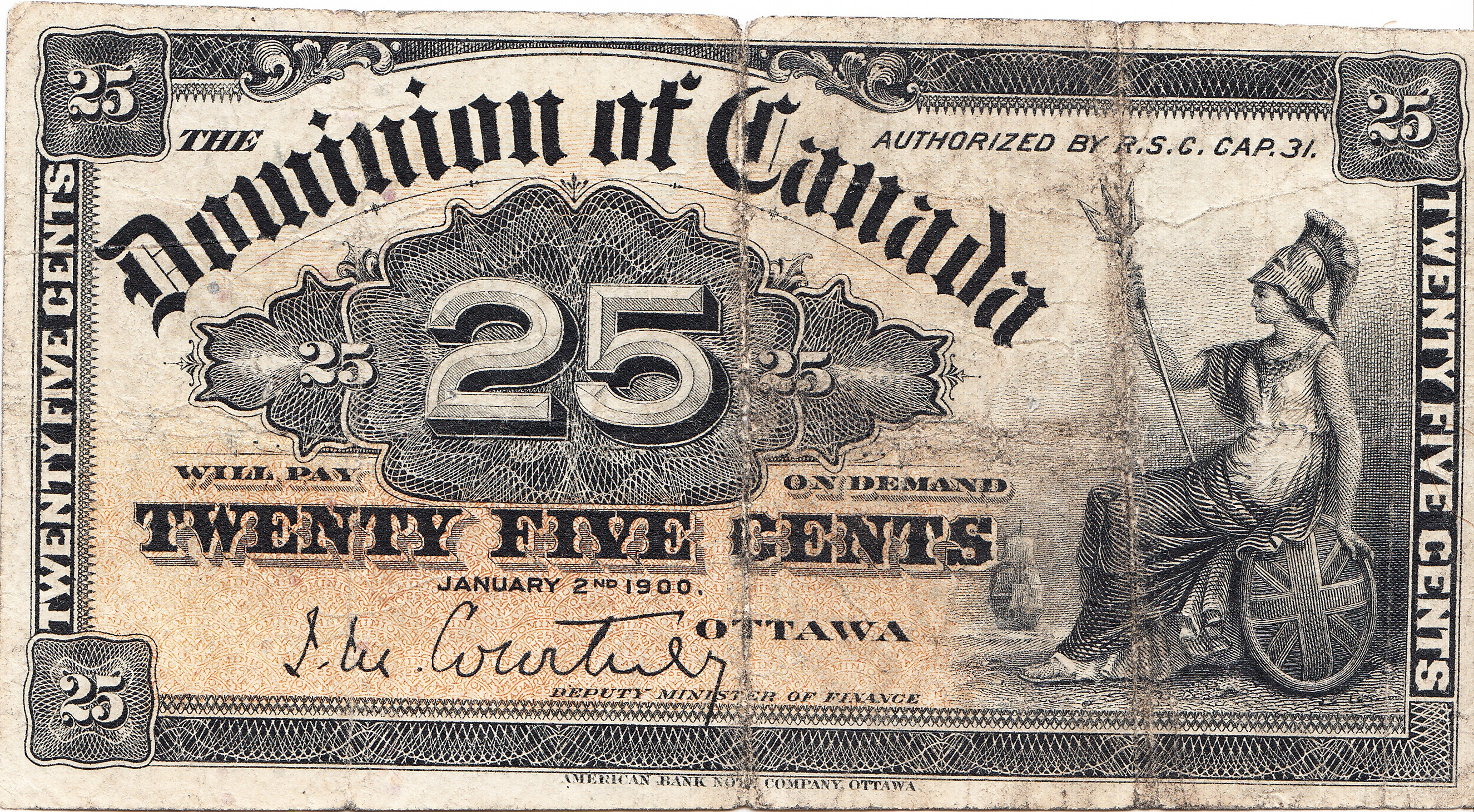
Canadian 25¢ "shinplaster", front (1900)

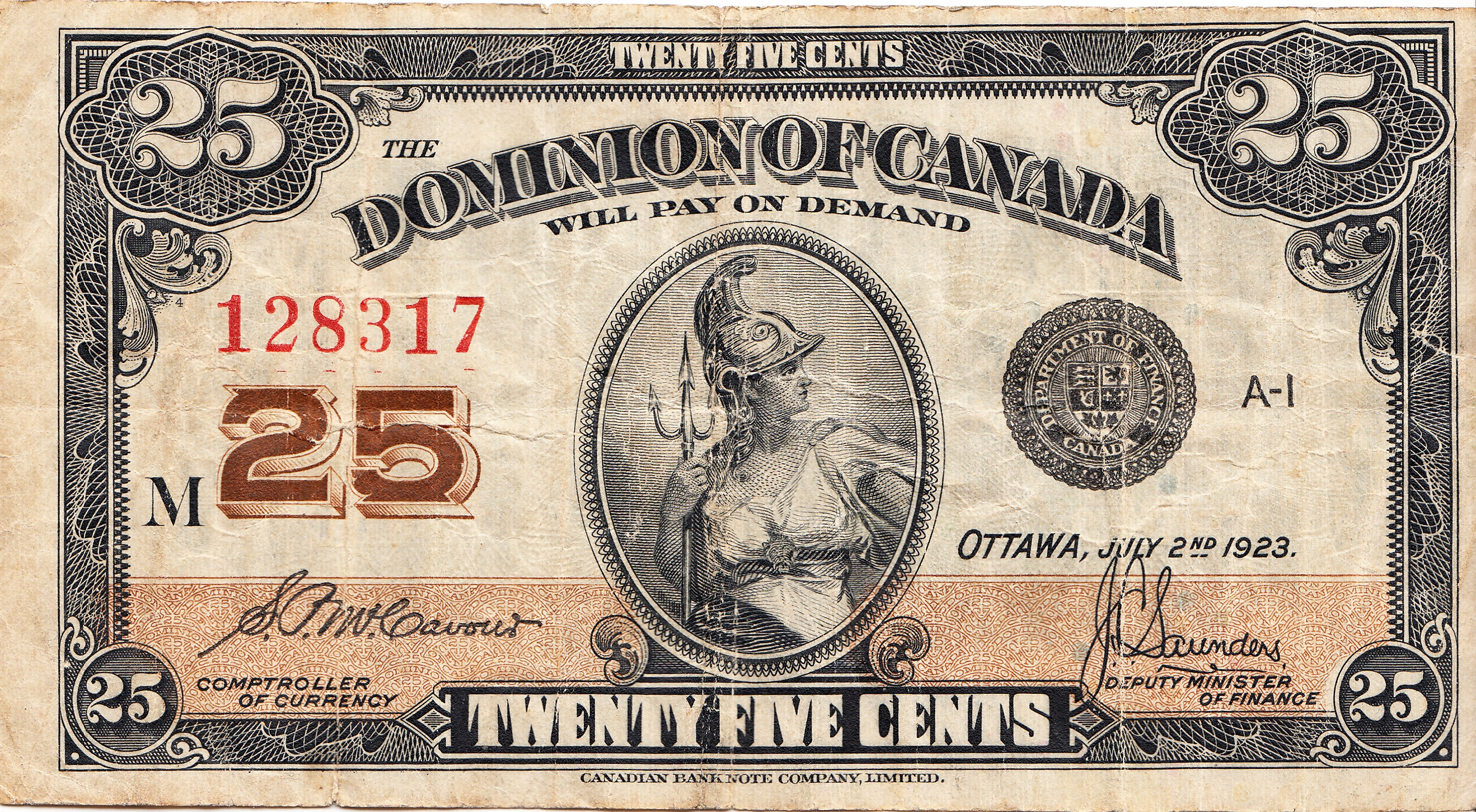
Canadian 25¢ "shinplaster", front (1923)

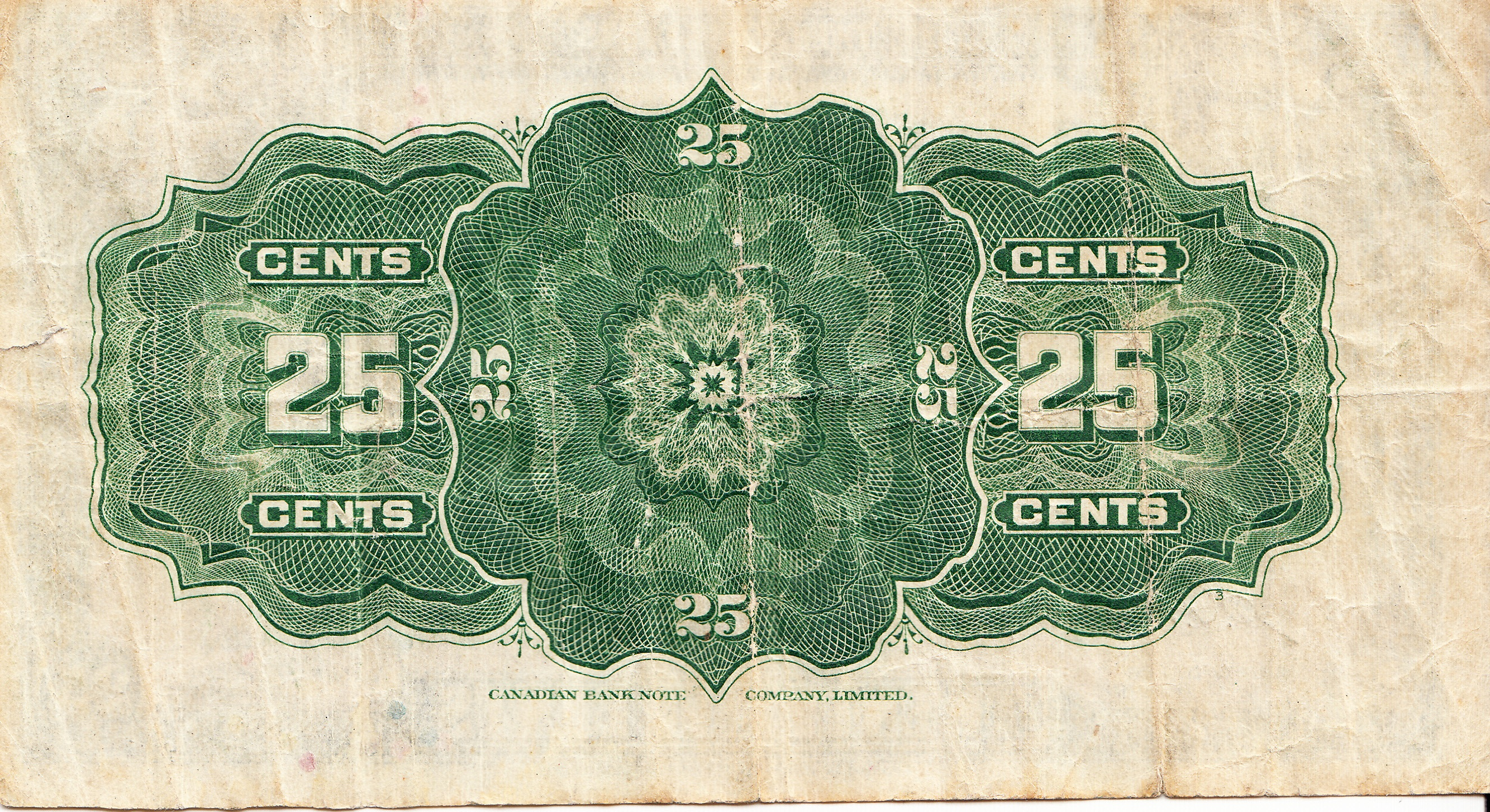
Canadian 25¢ "shinplaster", back (1900 / 1923)

Shinplaster was paper money of low denomination, typically less than one dollar, circulating widely in the economies of the 19th century where there was a shortage of circulating coinage. The shortage of circulating coins was primarily due to the intrinsic value of metal rising above the value of the coin itself. People became incentivized to take coins out of circulation and melt them for the true intrinsic value. This left no medium of exchange for the purchase of basic consumer goods such as milk and newspapers. To fill this gap, banks issued low-denomination paper currency.

== Etymology ==
The term shinplaster came into use during the American Revolutionary War. Shinplaster was a piece of paper soldiers put inside their boots to cushion their shins against chafing and rash (see plaster). Common, low-denomination notes, perceived as almost worthless compared to hard currency such as gold and silver, came to be known by this term.

== United States ==
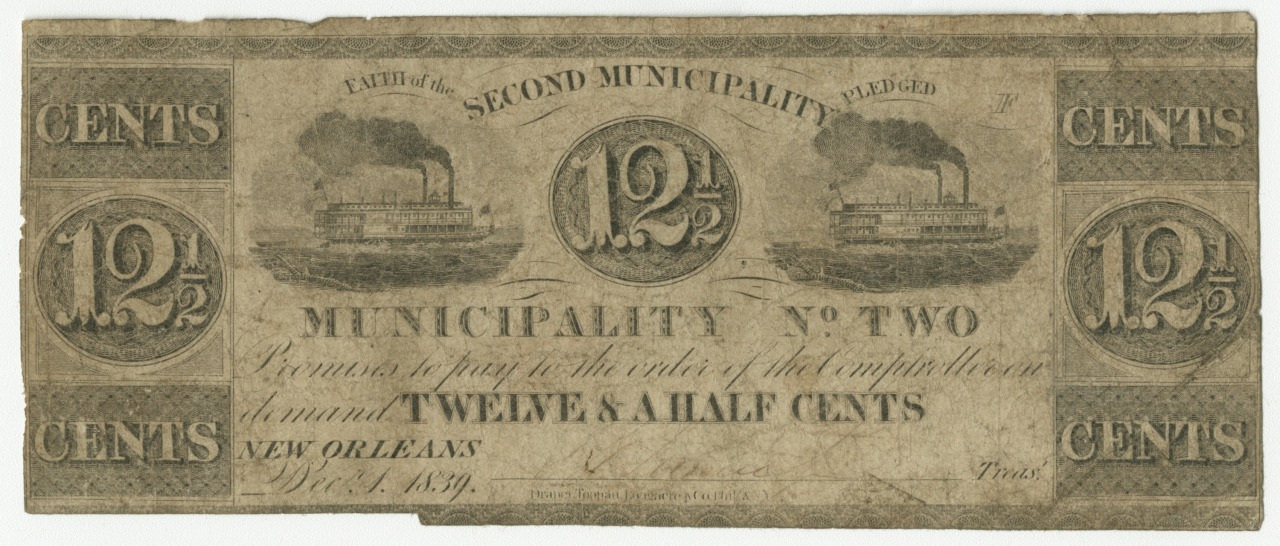
Twelve-and-a-half cent note from New Orleans, 1839

Private issues from stores, bank issues and tokens as well circulated as a method of accomplishing commercial transactions from 1837 to 1861. Shinplasters circulated in many parts of the western frontier during the mid 1800s, including in the Republic of Texas during its early days. The breadth of these private systems and the lack of integrity and security caused Francis Spinner, Secretary of the Treasury to produce a new idea. He pasted a few postage stamps on a Treasury sheet and passed it as a note. The process started where people used private notes tokens and Postal currencies as legal tender to accomplish their household and business purchasing. It became so popular that Spinner proposed to President Lincoln and Lincoln passed a bill in April 1861 enacting the postal Currency Act. This made postal currency legal and prohibited private, non-Governmental entities from producing notes, coins or currency. Thus, what we know as fractional currencies were born.

Shinplasters circulated in the United States from 1861 to 1869, during the Civil War and the Reconstruction era. Since much of the coins were sold to Canada by brokers and melted or sent to England for melt, Canada was overloaded with American coinage that began to be preferred as a circulation currency. The Minister of Finance decided to buy the American currencies at a very favorable rate, as they struck their replacement coinage in England, and they shipped these coins to New York to solve their problems. At the same time, the government fixed the exchange rate from American to Canadian coinage at 80% to discourage the import of more coinage. It worked. To help with the shortages, the Canadian Government issued in 1870 notes in the value of 25¢ as a single-note value. The initial notes were labeled as series A and an A was printed on the left side of the note toward the center. They printed 2,000,000 of these notes. In 1871, they printed another 3,000,000 25¢ notes of Series B to continue to fill this void and prevent American coins from coming back. From 1869 until the 1890s they printed 300,000 25¢ notes with no plate number on it. They used the old A and B plates and honed off the A and B letters. On some of these notes, remnants of the A and B are visible.

The government of the Dominion was able to fix the problem caused by the importation and commerce created by American coinage imported into Canada. They printed additional 25¢ notes with no plate number. This ended the importation and Canadians used Canadian notes to fuel their economy.

== Canada ==
In Canada, the term shinplaster was widely used for 25-cent paper monetary notes which circulated in the late 19th and early 20th centuries. The first design was printed on March 1, 1870, and the final design was first printed on July 2, 1923.

The term likely arose from the previously issued 5-shilling note (1/4 pound) which also bore the French term cinq piastres on the face. (Bank of Montreal museum)

== Australia ==
Shinplasters, or "calabashes" (as they were known in southern Queensland), were a feature of the Squatters' vast pastoral enterprises, and often circulated in the towns of the bush alongside and in place of legal tender. These private IOUs circulated widely, at times making up the bulk of cash in circulation, especially in the 1840s and 1850s.

In some places they formed the core of a company shop economy (Truck system), circulating as private currencies. They were often of such low quality that they could not be hoarded, and shopkeepers off the property would not take them, as such currency would deteriorate into illegibility before they could be redeemed.

There are tales of unscrupulous shopkeepers and others baking or otherwise artificially aging their calabashes given as change to travelers so that they crumbled to uselessness before they could be redeemed.

As commerce and trade grew in centres such as Toowoomba, more and more calabashes were issued, and more and more merchants, squatters and others engaged in transactions were forced to give their 'paper' in change or as payment for goods and services.
