= Fractional currency =

Series of United States dollar banknotes

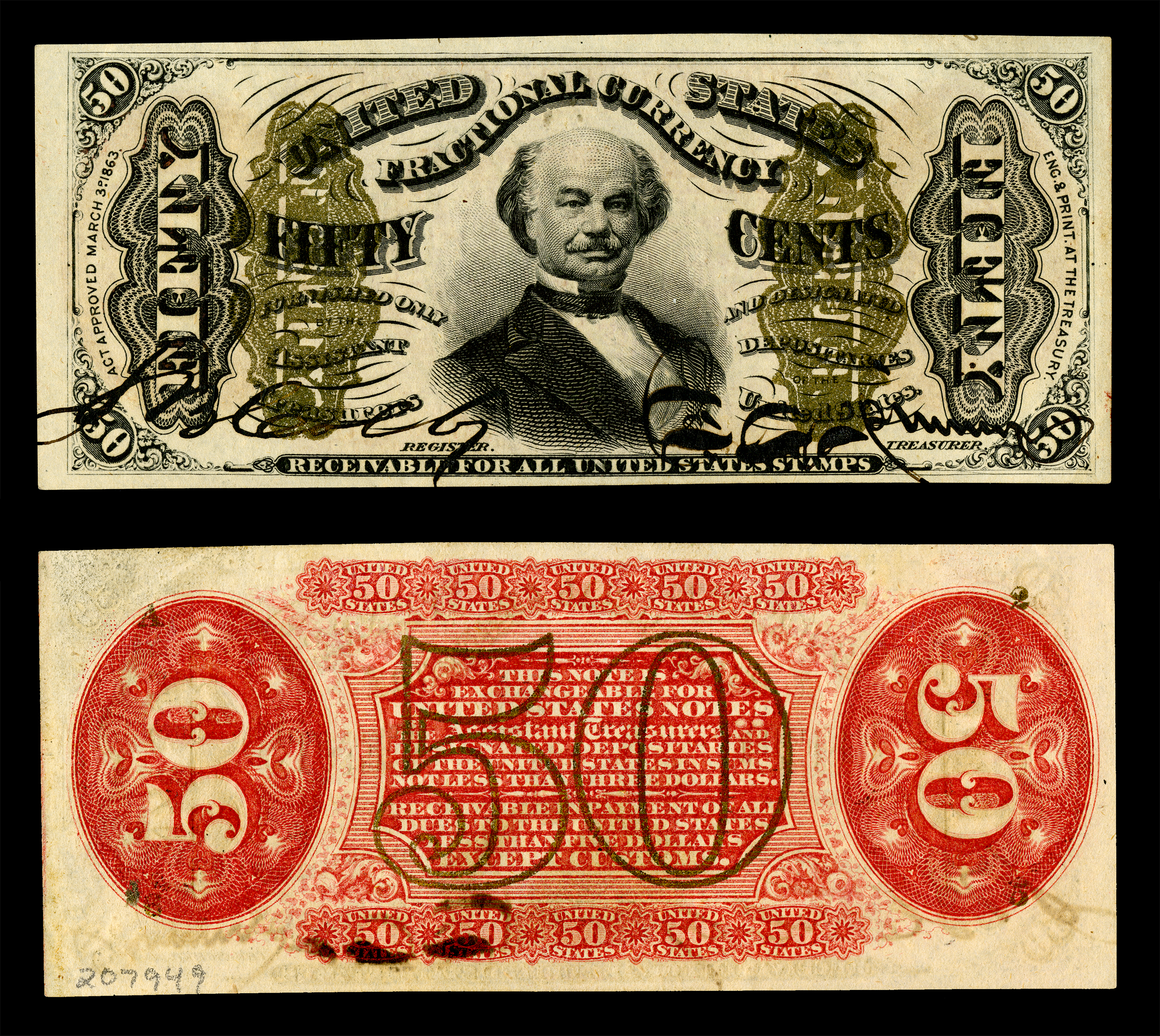
Fifty-cent fractional currency depicting Francis E. Spinner, with autograph signature.

Fractional currency, also referred to as shinplasters, was introduced by the United States federal government following the outbreak of the Civil War. These low-denomination banknotes of the United States dollar were in use between August 21, 1862, and February 15, 1876, and issued in denominations of 3, 5, 10, 15, 25, and 50 cents across five issuing periods. The complete type set below is part of the National Numismatic Collection, housed at the National Museum of American History, part of the Smithsonian Institution. (Note: All images are courtesy of the Smithsonian Institution.)

== History ==
The Civil War economy catalyzed a shortage of United States coinage—gold and silver coins were hoarded given their intrinsic bullion value relative to irredeemable paper currency at the time. In late 1861, to help finance the Civil War, the U.S. government borrowed gold coins from New York City banks in exchange for Seven-thirties treasury notes and the New York banks sold them to the public for gold to repay the loan. In December 1861, the Trent Affair shook public confidence with the threat of war on a second front. The United States Department of the Treasury suspended specie payments and banks in New York City stopped redeeming paper money for gold and silver. In the absence of gold and silver coin, the premium for specie began to devalue paper currency. After the New York banks suspended specie payments (quickly followed by Boston and Philadelphia) the premium on gold rose from 1–3% over paper in early January 1862 to 9% over paper in June 1862, by which time one paper dollar was worth 91.69 cents in gold. This fueled currency speculation (e.g., redeeming banknotes for silver coin which was then sold at a premium as bullion), and created significant disruption across businesses and trade. Alternate methods of providing small change included the reintroduction of Spanish quarter dollars in Philadelphia, cutting dollar bills in quarters or halves, refusing to provide change (without charging a premium for providing silver coins), or the issuance of locally issued shinplasters (i.e., those issued by businesses, local municipalities), which was forbidden by law in many states. Civil War tokens and encased postage stamps were also used for this purpose.

=== First Issue: Postage Currency ===
Treasurer of the United States Francis E. Spinner has been credited with finding the solution to the shortage of coinage: he created postage currency (which led into the use of fractional currency). Postage (or postal) currency was the first of five issues of US Post Office fractional paper money printed in 5-cent, 10-cent, 25-cent, and 50-cent denominations and issued from August 21, 1862, through May 27, 1863. Spinner proposed using postage stamps, affixed to Treasury paper, with his signature on the bottom (see illustration below). Based on this initiative, Congress supported a temporary solution involving fractional currency and on July 17, 1862, President Lincoln signed the Postage Currency Bill into law. The intent, however, was not that stamps should be a circulating currency.

The design of the first issue (postage currency) was directly based on Spinner's original handmade examples. Some varieties even had a perforated stamp-like edge. While not considered a legal tender, postage currency could be exchanged for United States Notes in $5 lots and were receivable in payment of all dues to the United States, up to $5. (Note: The payment obligation printed on first-issue notes states they are "Exchangeable for United States Notes by any Assistant Treasurer or designated U.S. Depositary in sums not less than five dollars. Receivable in payments of all dues to the U. States less than five dollars.") Subsequent issues would no longer include images of stamps and were referred to as Fractional Currency. Despite the July 1862 legislation, postage stamps remained a form of currency until postage currency gained momentum in the spring of 1863.

=== Second and subsequent Issues ===
In 1863, Secretary Chase asked for a new fractional currency that was harder to counterfeit than the postage currency. The new fractional currency notes were different from the 1862 postage currency issues. (Note: The payment obligation for the second issue was slightly different: "Exchangeable for United States Notes by the Assistant Treasurer and designated depositories of the U.S. in sums not less than three dollars. Receivable in payment of all dues to the United States less than five dollars except customs.") They were more colorful with printing on the reverse, and several anti-counterfeiting measures were employed: experimental paper, adding surcharges, overprints, blue endpaper, silk fibers, and watermarks to name a few. Fractional currency shields which had single-sided specimens were sold to banks to provide a standard for comparison for detecting counterfeits. Postage and fractional currency remained in use until 1876, when Congress authorized the minting of fractional silver coins to redeem the outstanding fractional currency.

== Issuing periods and varieties ==
Issuing periods of United States fractional currency
Issuing period	Period dates	Denominations issued	Features/varieties
First issue	Aug 21, 1862; May 27, 1863	$0.05 $0.10 $0.25 $0.50	Issued as postage currency with two main varieties: 1) edges (straight versus perforated), and 2) monogram (presence or absence of the American Bank Note Co. monogram (ABCo) on the reverse). (Note: The reverse of the first issue was originally printed by the National Bank Note Company. As a security precaution, the Treasury moved the printing contract to the American Bank Note Company who added their monogram ABC to the reverse of the remaining first-issue notes.) All four denominations bear the stamp motif on the obverse.
Second issue	October 10, 1863; Feb 23, 1867	$0.05 $0.10 $0.25 $0.50	Introduction of numerous anti-counterfeiting measures: bronze oval (obverse), bronze ink surcharge (reverse), use of fiber paper. (Note: Also known as membrane paper; two sheets of paper bonded together with fibers embedded.)
Third issue	December 5, 1864; Aug 16, 1869	$0.03 $0.05 $0.10 $0.25 $0.50	Sporadic use of surcharges, signatures introduced (except 3-cent) both printed (PS) and autographed (AS), design features (or position indicators) – either the letter "a", the number "1", or both, on the extreme left obverse.
Fourth issue	July 14, 1869; Feb 16, 1875	$0.10 $0.15 $0.25 $0.50	Additional anti-counterfeiting measures: watermarked paper ("US"), embedding of large silk fibers, blue tinted end paper.
Fifth issue	February 26, 1874; Feb 15, 1876	$0.10 $0.25 $0.50	Color tinting in paper, silk fibers.

Inspiration, model, and proof for the first issue (postage currency) along with encased postage stamp

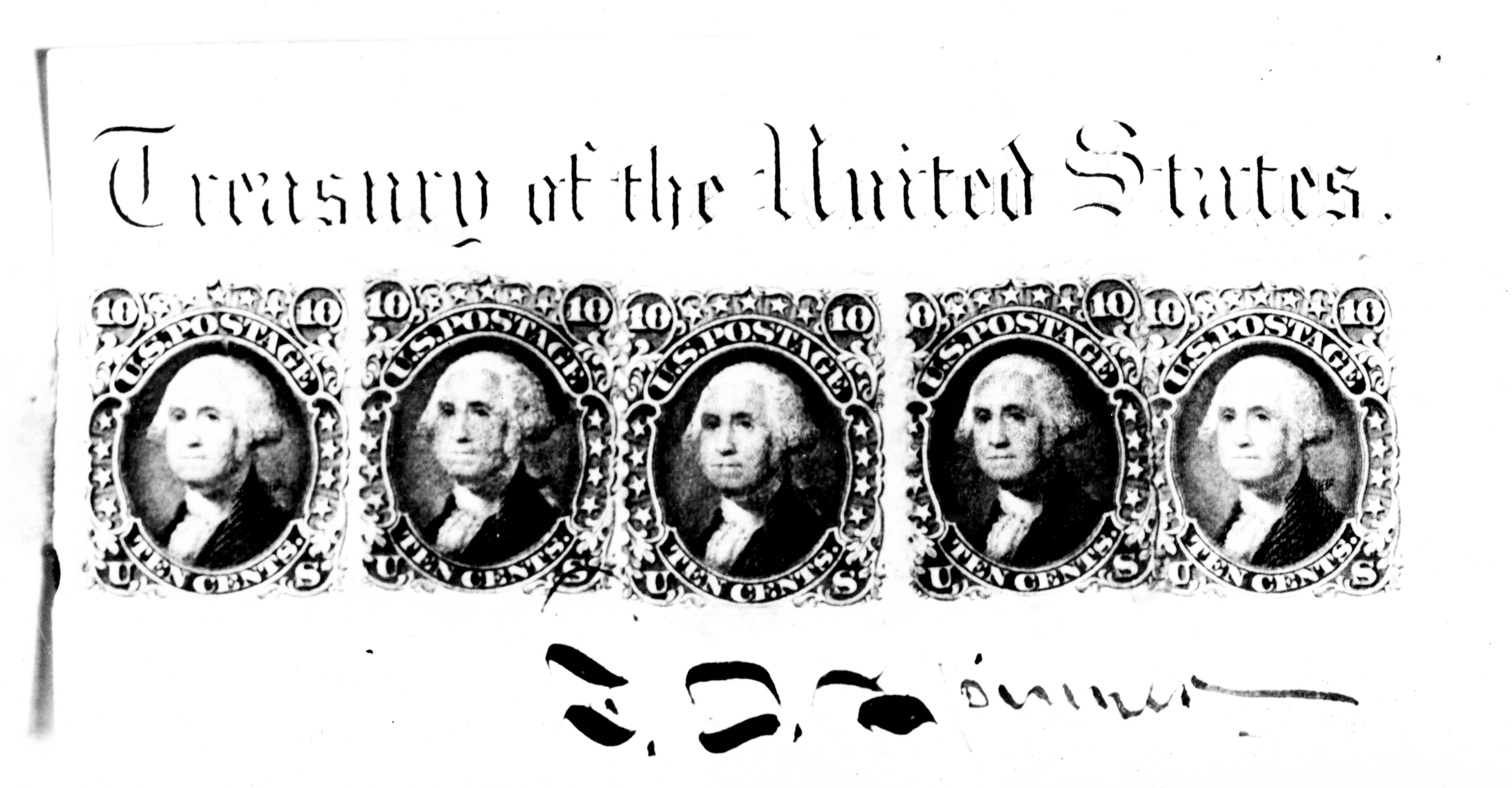
Spinner's initial signed design (photo)

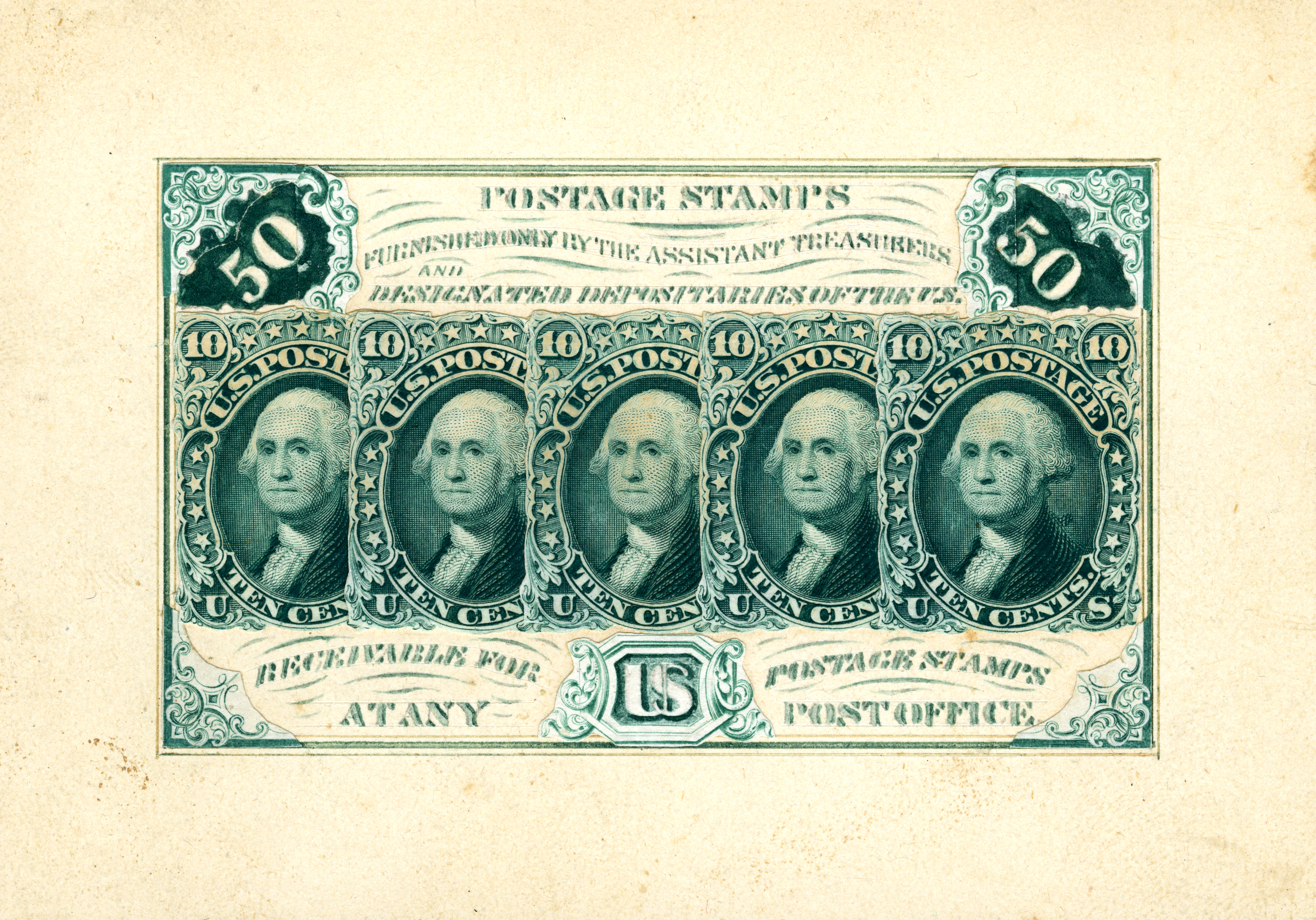
Original model artwork

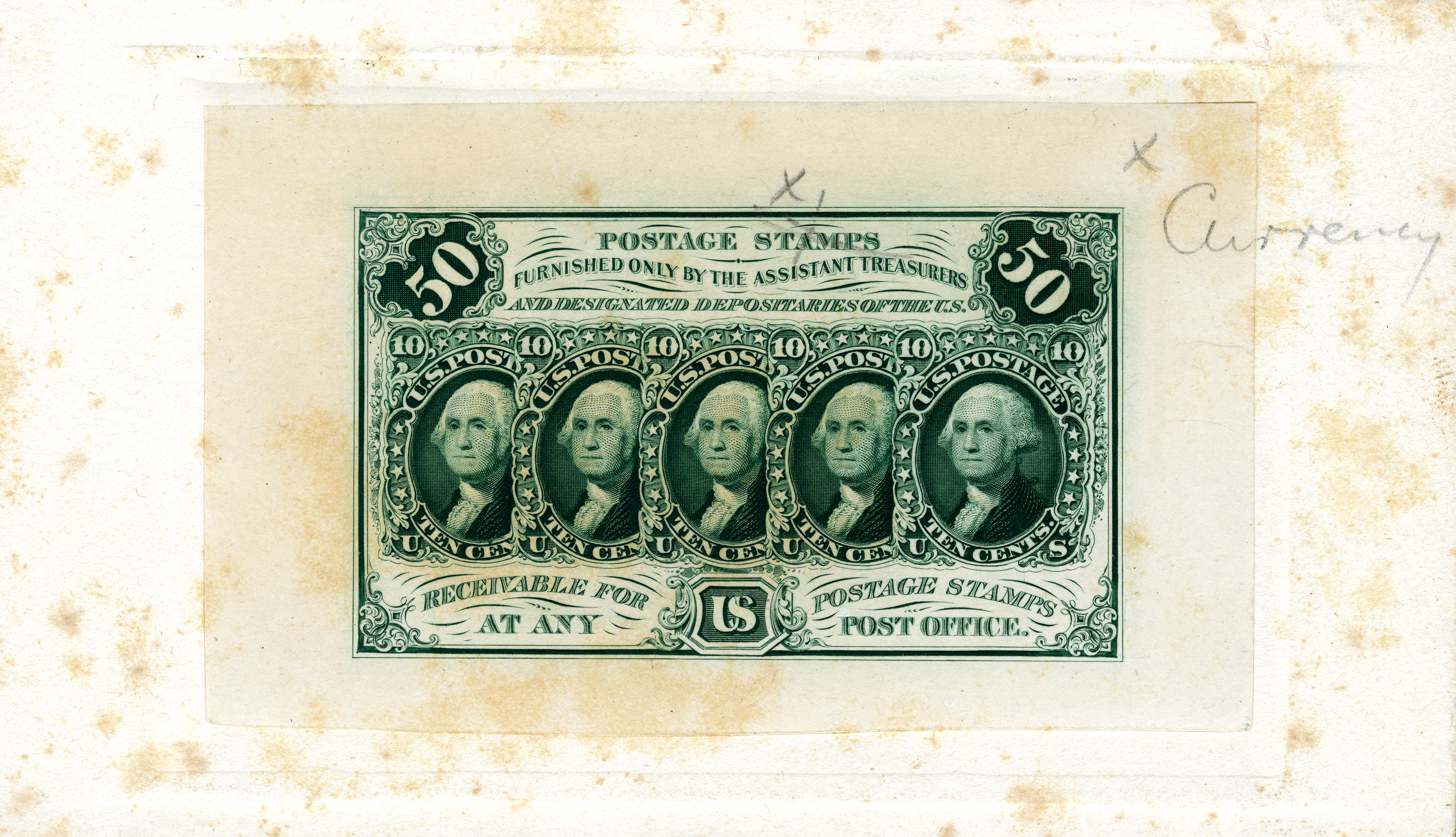
Working proof with pencil notations

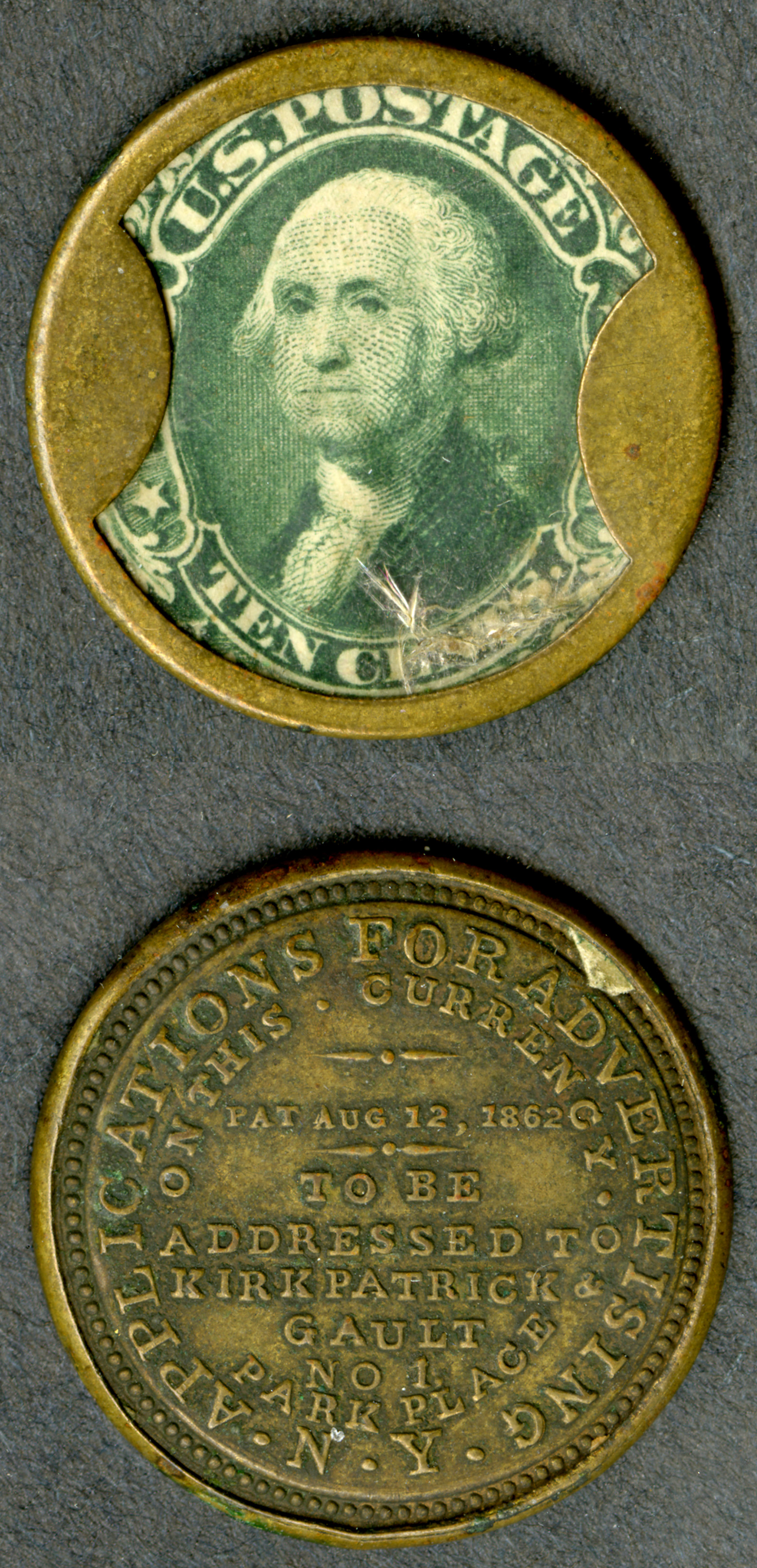
Encased postage example.

== Complete type set of United States fractional currency ==
Value	Series	Size (Note: Sort by size is based on the surface area of the note in square millimetres. Margins and cut may affect the listed dimensions, but generally not more than +/- 2 mm)	Fr. no. (Note: "Fr" numbers refer to the numbering system in the widely used Friedberg reference book. Fr. numbers indicate varieties existing within a larger type design.)	Image	Portrait	Varieties (Note: Varieties are taken from the standard paper money reference by Arthur and Ira Friedberg, with additional descriptions in the Kravitz collector's guide)
$0.05	First issue	65 × 43.5 mm	Fr.1231	Five-cent first-issue fractional note	Thomas Jefferson	1228 – Perforated; monogram 1229 – Perforated; no monogram 1230 – Straight; monogram 1231 – Straight; no monogram
$0.10	First issue	65 × 43.5 mm	Fr.1240	Ten-cent first-issue fractional note	George Washington	1240 – Perforated; monogram 1241 – Perforated; no monogram 1242 – Straight; monogram 1243 – Straight; no monogram
$0.25	First issue	78 × 48 mm	Fr.1280	Twenty five-cent first-issue fractional note	Thomas Jefferson	1279 – Perforated; monogram 1280 – Perforated; no monogram 1281 – Straight; monogram 1282 – Straight; no monogram
$0.50	First issue	78 × 48 mm	Fr.1312	fifty-cent first-issue fractional note	George Washington	1310 – Perforated; monogram 1311 – Perforated; no monogram 1311a – Same, except 14 versus 12 perf/20 mm 1312 – Straight; monogram 1313 – Straight; no monogram
$0.05	Second issue	65.5 × 47 mm	Fr.1232	Five-cent second-issue fractional note	George Washington	1232 – No surcharge 1233 – Surcharge "18-63"; 1234 – Surcharge "18-63" and "S"; 1235 – Surcharge "18-63" and "R-1"; Fiber paper
$0.10	Second issue	65.5 × 47 mm	Fr.1246	Ten-cent second-issue fractional note	George Washington	1244 – No surcharge 1245 – Surcharge "18-63” 1246 – Surcharge "18-63" and "S” 1247 – Surcharge "18-63" and "I” 1248 – Surcharge "0-63"; 1249 – Surcharge "18-63” and "T-1"
$0.25	Second issue	65.5 × 47 mm	Fr.1284	Twenty five-cent second-issue fractional note	George Washington	1283 – No surcharge. 1284 – Surcharge "18-63"; 1285 – Surcharge "18-63" and "A"; 1286 – Surcharge "18-63" and "S"; 1287 – Unissued Friedberg number 1288 – Surcharge "18-63" and "2"; 1289 – Surcharge "18-63" and "T-1"; fiber paper 1290 – Surcharge "18-63" and "T-2"; fiber paper
$0.50	Second issue	65.5 × 47 mm	Fr.1322	fifty-cent second-issue fractional note	George Washington	1314 – No surcharge 1315 – Unissued Friedberg number 1316 – Surcharge "18-63"; 1317 – Surcharge "18-63" and "A"; 1318 – Surcharge "18-63" and "1"; 1319 – Unissued Friedberg number 1320 – Surcharge "18-63" and "0-1"; fiber paper 1321 – Surcharge "18-63" and "R-2"; fiber paper 1322 – Surcharge "18-63" and "T-1"; fiber paper
$0.03	Third issue	66 × 40.5 mm	Fr.1226	Three-cent third-issue fractional note	George Washington	1226 – Portrait light background 1227 – Portrait dark background
$0.05	Third issue	64 × 46 mm	Fr.1238	Five-cent third-issue fractional note	Spencer Clark	1236 – Red reverse 1237 – Red reverse; design letter "a" 1238 – Green reverse 1239 – Green reverse; design letter "a"
$0.10	Third issue	81 × 47 mm	Fr.1254	Ten-cent third-issue fractional note	George Washington	1251 – 1254 Red reverse 1251 – Red reverse 1252 – Red reverse; design numeral "1"; 1253 – Red reverse; (AS) Colby and Spinner; 1254 – Red reverse; (AS) Jeffries and Spinner 1255 – 1256 Green reverse 1255 – Green reverse 1255a – Green reverse; (AS) Colby and Spinner; 1256 – Green reverse; design numeral "1"
$0.25	Third issue	95.5 × 47 mm	Fr.1294	Twenty five-cent third-issue fractional note	William Fessenden	1291 – 1293 Red reverse 1291 – Red reverse 1292 – Red reverse; design letter "a" 1293 – Friedberg number removed from use 1294 – 1300 Green reverse 1294 – Green reverse 1295 – Green reverse; design letter "a" 1296 – Green reverse; large design letter "a" 1297 – Green reverse; surcharge "M-2-6-5"; fiber paper 1298 – Green reverse; same as 1297; design letter "a" 1299 – Green reverse; surcharge "M-2-6-5"; obverse ornamental designs in sold bronze overprint; fiber paper 1300 – Green reverse; same as 1299; design letter "a"
$0.50	Third issue	114 × 48 mm	Fr.1328	fifty-cent third-issue fractional note	Francis Spinner	1324 – 1330 Red reverse; surcharge "A-2-6-5" 1324 – Red reverse; surcharge "A-2-6-5"; no design figures 1325 – Red reverse; surcharge "A-2-6-5"; design figures "1" and "a" 1326 – Red reverse; surcharge "A-2-6-5"; design figure "1"; 1327 – Red reverse; surcharge "A-2-6-5"; design figure "a" 1328 – Red reverse; surcharge "A-2-6-5"; (AS) Colby and Spinner; 1329 – Red reverse; surcharge "A-2-6-5"; (AS) Allison and Spinner; 1330 – Red reverse; surcharge "A-2-6-5"; (AS) Allison and New 1331 – 1334 Green reverse; no surcharge 1331 – Green reverse; no surcharge; no design figures 1332 – Green reverse; no surcharge; design figures "1" and "a" 1333 – Green reverse; no surcharge; design figure "1"; 1334 – Green reverse; no surcharge; design figure "a" 1335 – 1338 Green reverse; surcharge "A-2-6-5" 1335 – Green reverse; surcharge "A-2-6-5"; no design figures 1336 – Green reverse; surcharge "A-2-6-5"; design figures "1" and "a" 1337 – Green reverse; surcharge "A-2-6-5"; design figure "1"; 1338 – Green reverse; surcharge "A-2-6-5"; design figure "a"
$0.50	Third issue	114 × 48 mm	Fr.1339	fifty-cent third-issue fractional note	Francis Spinner	1339 – Green reverse; no surcharge or design figures 1340 – Green reverse; design figures "1” and "a" 1341 – Green reverse; design figure "1"; 1342 – Green reverse; design figure "a"
$0.50	Third issue	114 × 48 mm	Fr.1355	fifty-cent third-issue fractional note	Justice holding scales	1343 – 1346 Red reverse; no surcharge 1343 – Red reverse; no surcharge; no design figures 1344 – Red reverse; no surcharge; design figures "1" and "a" 1345 – Red reverse; no surcharge; design figure "1"; 1346 – Red reverse; no surcharge; design figure "a" 1347 – 1350 Red reverse; surcharge "A-2-6-5" 1347 – Red reverse; surcharge "A-2-6-5"; no design figures 1348 – Red reverse; surcharge "A-2-6-5"; design figures "1" and "a" 1349 – Red reverse; surcharge "A-2-6-5"; design figure "1"; 1350 – Red reverse; surcharge "A-2-6-5"; design figure "a" 1351 – 1354 Red reverse; surcharge "S-2-6-4"; (PS) 1351 – Red reverse; surcharge "S-2-6-4"; (PS); no design figures; fiber paper 1352 – Red reverse; surcharge "S-2-6-4"; (PS); design figures "1" and "a"; fiber paper In 2004, a Fr. 1352 (one of only three known), sold at public auction for $126,500. 1353 – Red reverse; surcharge "S-2-6-4"; (PS); design figure "1"; fiber paper 1354 – Red reverse; surcharge "S-2-6-4"; (PS); design figure "a"; fiber paper 1355 – 1357 Red reverse; (AS) Colby and Spinner 1355 – Red reverse; (AS) Colby and Spinner; no surcharge or design figures 1356 – Red reverse; (AS) Colby and Spinner; surcharge "A-2-6-5"; 1357 – Red reverse; (AS) Colby and Spinner; surcharge "A-2-6-4"; fiber paper 1358 – 1361 Green reverse; no surcharge 1358 – Green reverse; no surcharge; no design figures 1359 – Green reverse; no surcharge; design figures "1" and "a" 1360 – Green reverse; no surcharge; design figure "1"; 1361 – Green reverse; no surcharge; design figure "a" 1362 – 1365 Green reverse; surcharge "A-2-6-5" (narrow) 1362 – Green reverse; surcharge "A-2-6-5" (narrow); no design figures 1363 – Green reverse; surcharge "A-2-6-5" (narrow); design figures "1" and "a" 1364 – Green reverse; surcharge "A-2-6-5" (narrow); design figure "1"; 1365 – Green reverse; surcharge "A-2-6-5" (narrow); design figure "a". *narrow – spacing of the surcharge 1366 – 1369 Green reverse; surcharge "A-2-6-5" (wide) 1366 – Green reverse; surcharge "A-2-6-5" (wide); no design figures 1367 – Green reverse; surcharge "A-2-6-5" (wide); design figures "1" and "a" 1368 – Green reverse; surcharge "A-2-6-5" (wide); design figure "1"; 1369 – Green reverse; surcharge "A-2-6-5" (wide); design figure "a" *wide – spacing of the surcharge 1370 – 1373a Green reverse; surcharge "A-2-6-5"; fiber paper 1370 – Green reverse; surcharge "A-2-6-5"; fiber paper; no design figures 1371 – Green reverse; surcharge "A-2-6-5"; fiber paper; design figures "1" and "a" 1372 – Green reverse; surcharge "A-2-6-5"; fiber paper; design figure "1"; 1373 – Green reverse; surcharge "A-2-6-5"; fiber paper; design figure "a" 1373a – Green reverse; surcharge "A-2-6-4"; fiber paper; (PS); no design figure
$0.10	Fourth issue	79 × 46 mm	Fr.1259	Ten-cent fourth-issue fractional note	Bust of Liberty	1257 – Large red seal; watermarked; silk fibers (pink); 1258 – Large red seal; silk fibers (pink); 1259 – Large red seal; silk fibers (violet); blue end paper 1260 – Does not exist 1261 – Smaller red seal; silk fibers (violet); blue end paper
$0.15	Fourth issue	89 × 46 mm	Fr.1269	Fifteen-cent fourth-issue fractional note	Bust of Columbia	1267 – Large red seal; watermarked; silk fibers (pink); 1268 – Large red seal; silk fibers (pink); 1269 – Large red seal; silk fibers (violet); blue end paper 1270 – Does not exist 1271 – Smaller red seal; silk fibers (violet); blue end paper
$0.25	Fourth issue	96.5 × 46 mm	Fr.1303	Twenty five-cent fourth-issue fractional note	George Washington	1301 – Large red seal; watermarked; silk fibers (pink); 1302 – Large red seal; silk fibers (pink); 1303 – Large red seal; silk fibers (violet); blue end paper 1307 – Smaller red seal; silk fibers (violet); blue end paper (Note: Fr.1304, 1305, and 1306 are unassigned.)
$0.50	Fourth issue	106 × 47 mm	Fr.1374	fifty-cent fourth-issue fractional note	Abraham Lincoln	1374 – Large seal; watermarked; silk fibers (pink); 1375 – Delisted Friedberg number
$0.50	Fourth issue	103 × 46 mm	Fr.1376	fifty-cent fourth-issue fractional note	Edwin Stanton	1376 – Small red seal; silk fibers (violet); blue end paper
$0.50	Fourth issue	95 × 52 mm	Fr.1379	fifty-cent fourth-issue fractional note	Samuel Dexter	1379 - Green seal; silk fibers (light violet); blue end paper
$0.10	Fifth issue	81 × 51 mm	Fr.1265	Ten-cent fifth-issue fractional note	William Meredith	1264 – Green seal 1265 – Red seal; long, thin key (in Treasury seal); 1266 – Red seal; short, thick key (in Treasury seal)
$0.25	Fifth issue	88.5 × 51.5 mm	Fr.1308	Twenty five-cent fifth-issue fractional note	Robert Walker	1308 – Long, thin key (in Treasury seal); 1309 – Short, thick key (in Treasury seal)
$0.50	Fifth issue	109.5 × 53.5 mm	Fr.1381	fifty-cent fifth-issue fractional note	William Crawford	1380 – Red seal; light pink paper on obverse; silk fibers 1381 – Red seal; blue end paper; silk fibers

== Portraits of living individuals ==
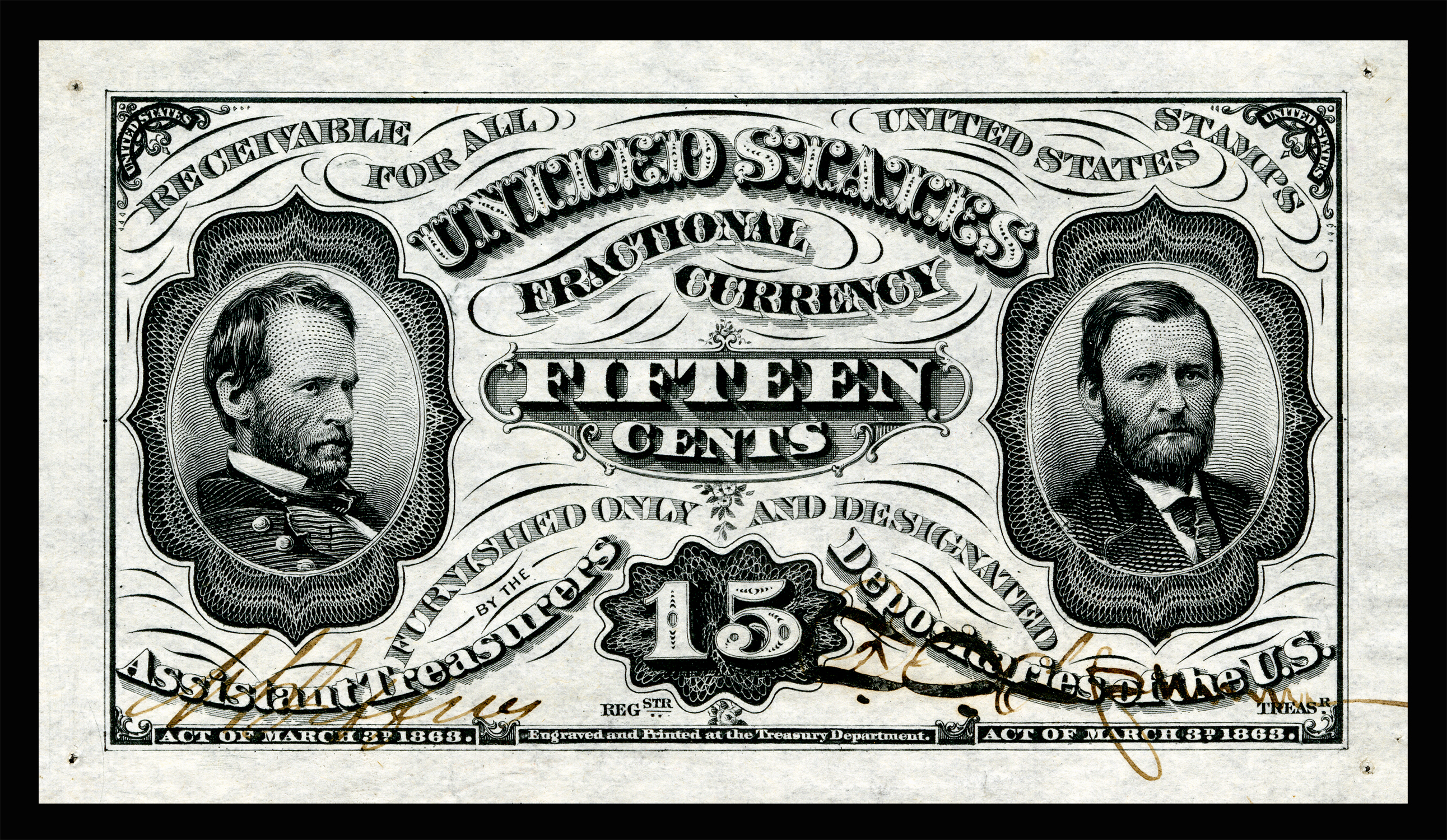
The Sherman–Grant 15-cent third issue exists only as an unissued specimen.

Three people were depicted on fractional currency during their lifetime: Francis E. Spinner (Treasurer of the United States), William P. Fessenden (U.S. Senator and Secretary of the Treasury), and Spencer M. Clark (Superintendent of the National Currency Bureau). Both Spinner and Clark decided to have their portrait depicted on currency, which created controversy. Republican Representative Martin R. Thayer of Pennsylvania was an outspoken critic, suggesting that the Treasury's privilege of portrait selection for currency was being abused. (Note: "But now we see upon our current paper money not only the heads of the illustrious men of our country long since gathered to their fathers, but of living secretaries of the Treasury, and even of such subordinate officers as the superintendent of the Currency Printing Bureau, Mr. S.M. Clark.") On April 7, 1866, led by Thayer, Congress enacted legislation specifically stating "that no portrait or likeness of any living person hereafter engraved, shall be placed upon any of the bonds, securities, notes, fractional or postal currency of the United States." On the date of passage, a number of plates for the new 15-cent note depicting William Tecumseh Sherman and Ulysses S. Grant had been completed, as the plate proofs for these exist in the archives of the Smithsonian Institute's National Museum of American History. However, the plates were never used to produce notes for circulation. The only Sherman-Grant examples produced were single-sided specimens that were placed on Fractional Currency Shields.

== See also ==
- Federal Reserve System
- List of people on United States banknotes
- Treasury Note (19th century)
- United States postal notes
