= Treasury Note (19th century) =

Type of short term debt instrument in the United States

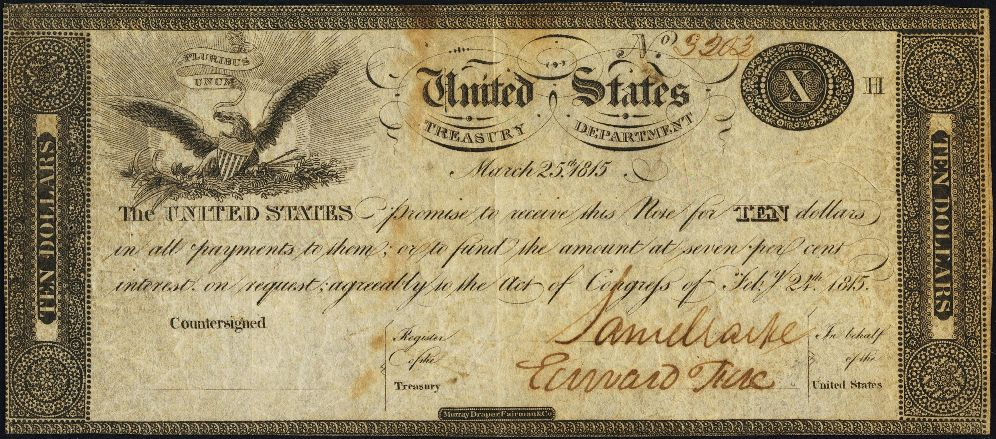
An unissued $10 Small Treasury Note, authorized by the Act of February 24, 1815. This particular note is a remainder which was given a serial number but was never countersigned.

A Treasury Note is a type of short-term debt instrument issued by the United States prior to the creation of the Federal Reserve System in 1913. Without the alternatives offered by a federal paper money or a central bank, the U.S. government relied on these instruments for funding during periods of financial stress such as the War of 1812, the Panic of 1837, and the American Civil War. While the Treasury Notes, as issued, were neither legal tender nor representative money, some issues were used as money in lieu of an official federal paper money. However the motivation behind their issuance was always funding federal expenditures rather than the provision of a circulating medium. These notes typically were hand-signed, of large denomination (at least $50), of large dimension (bigger than private banknotes), bore interest, were payable to the order of the owner (whose name was written on the front of the note), and matured in no more than three years – though some issues lacked one or more of these properties. Often they were receivable at face value by the government in payment of taxes and for purchases of publicly owned land, and thus "might to some extent be regarded as paper money." On many issues the interest rate was chosen to make interest calculations particularly easy, paying either 1, 1 1/2, or 2 cents per day on a $100 note.

Characteristically, the issues were not extensive and, as it has been observed, "the polite fiction was always maintained that Treasury Notes did not serve as money when, in fact, to a limited extent they did." The value of these notes varied, being worth more or less than par as market conditions fluctuated, and they rapidly disappeared from the financial system after the crisis associated with their issuance had ended.

The ante-bellum Treasury Notes did not have legal tender status, but financial innovation during the Civil War caused the term Treasury Note to become associated with legal tender instruments such as the United States Notes introduced in 1862 and the Compound Interest Treasury Notes introduced in 1863. The appearance of these new obligations, together with the changes brought about by the National Banking Act, effectively eliminated most of the uses of the old Treasury Notes as money and the term Certificate of Indebtedness was introduced to apply to new notes which possessed the debt-like aspects of the pre-war Notes. Today the Treasury's short term debt needs are fulfilled by Treasury bills.

== Origin ==
The early finances of the central government of the United States were precarious. To help finance the American Revolution the Continental Congress had issued Continental Dollars between 1775 and 1779. The paper Continental Dollars nominally entitled the bearer to an equivalent amount of silver Spanish Milled Dollars but were repeatedly devalued and were never redeemed in silver despite the American victory. With the fate of the Continentals in mind, the Founding Fathers embedded in the Constitution no provision for a paper currency, and they forbade the states to make anything but gold or silver a legal tender. As part of the Compromise of 1790, the Continental Dollars were redeemed at a loss of over 99% vs. their face value, but the United States did choose to perform on revolutionary war bond obligations in full by pledging the publicly owned land and the credit of the new federal government against the bonds. As a result, America's early creditors had reason to be wary of a paper currency, but reason to respect its debt.

The Founding Fathers were divided over whether the United States needed a central bank similar to the Bank of England to issue currency and facilitate the government's use of credit. An early American attempt at central banking along these lines was the Bank of North America which played a meaningful role in helping the Congress of the Confederation to arrange its finances during the 1780s, but its rechartering in 1786 prevented it from continuing to act as a central bank. Subsequently, the 1st United States Congress chartered the First Bank of the United States in 1791 to facilitate its financial operations, but in 1811 its charter was not renewed due to opposition from the Madison administration.

Thus, when the declaration of the War of 1812 impaired the government's ability to raise money via the sale of long-term bonds, the United States had no paper currency nor a central bank with which to obtain emergency short-term financing, and it used its borrowing authority to issue short-term debt in the form of Treasury Notes receivable for public dues or bond purchases. Having thus set the precedent, the Treasury would go on to irregularly issue such notes up through the Civil War.

== War of 1812 ==
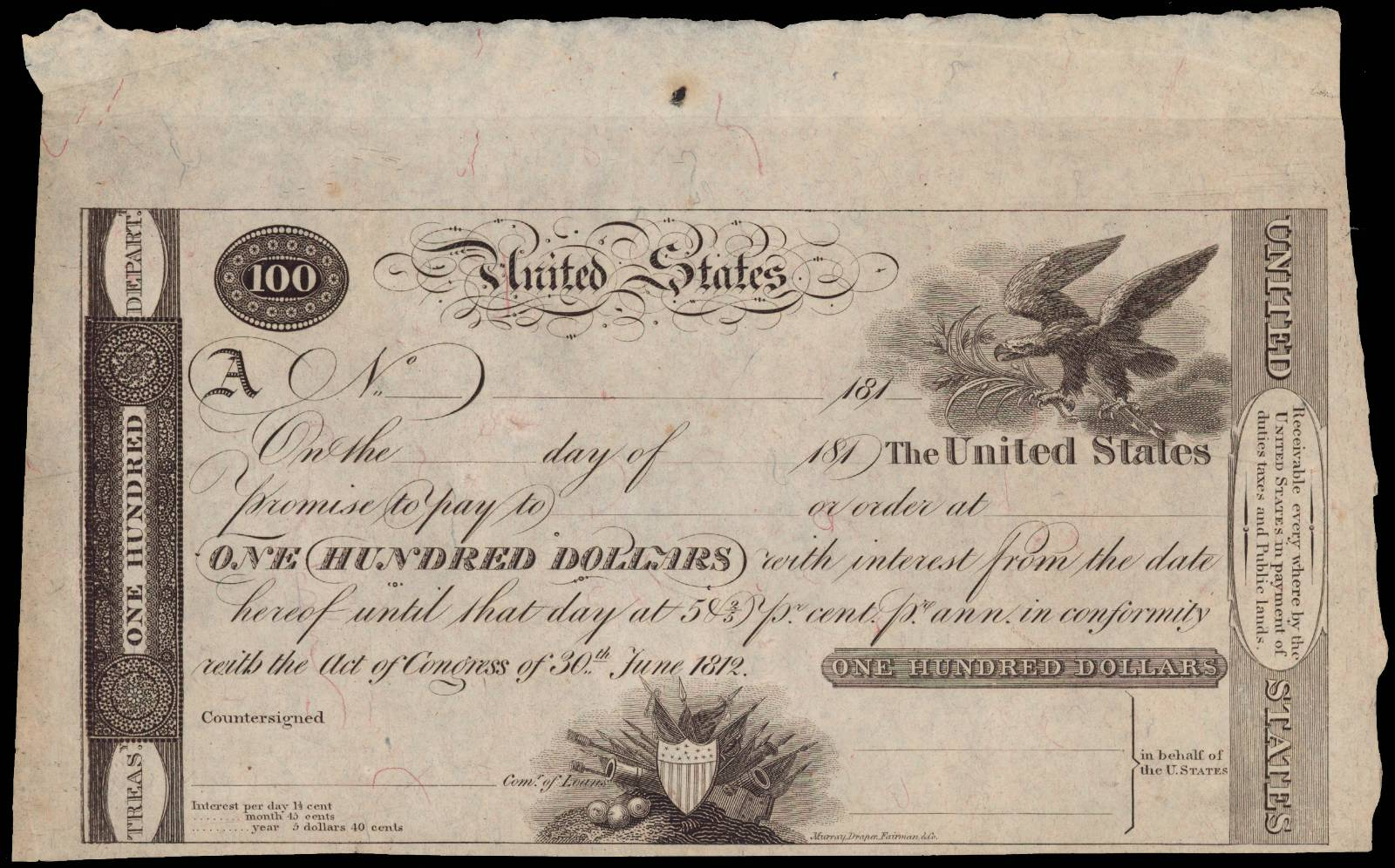
An unissued and untrimmed remainder from a sheet of the first issue of Treasury Notes, authorized by the Act of June 30, 1812. The issued notes of this type were trimmed to size, signed in three places, dated, and endorsed as payable to the order of the purchaser or his/her assignee.

Several issues of Treasury Notes were made during the War of 1812 from 1812 to 1815. Most of these notes paid 5 2/5% interest (or 1 1/2 cents per day on a $100 note), matured in one year, and were receivable in payment for public dues. While $37 million were issued, no more than $17 million were outstanding at any one time.

Five acts authorized these Notes. The first, on June 20, 1812, authorized 1-year Treasury Notes at 5 2/5% interest to fill out the unsubscribed portion of an $11 million loan in support of the war with Britain which had just been declared on the 18th. Only about $6 million of the loan was placed in the form of 6% interest bonds, and thus $5 million of Notes were issued. The Notes were made receivable for all public dues owed the federal government and payable to the order of the owner by endorsement. A further $5 million of similar Notes were authorized on February 25, 1813 to supplement additional loans which had not been fully subscribed. Only Notes of $100 denomination and greater were issued under these first two acts, and they sold at prices close to par.

The next two acts, those of March 4, 1814 and Dec 26, 1814, called for Note issues both to independently raise revenue as well as to substitute for unsubscribed loans. A total of $18,318,400 were emitted under these acts which included Notes of $20 and $50 denominations in addition to the larger Notes.

During 1814 federal finances deteriorated as the war dragged on, and banks outside New England suspended specie payment on August 31, 1814. The value of the Treasury Notes fell below that of specie. New England states were unsympathetic to the war and when the government attempted to withdraw deposits from a Boston bank to make interest payments on October 1, 1814, the bank took the position that it could tender Treasury Notes to the government which were then rejected by the holders of the government bonds who expected payment in specie. These developments led to changes in the final Treasury Note act of the era signed on February 24, 1815. These last notes were divided into large ($100 and over) and small (under $100) denominations, and did not expire at any predetermined time. The large notes paid interest as before, at 5 2/5% per annum, but could also be used to purchase 6 percent interest bonds at par (i.e. were fundable into the bonds) as a way of supporting their value.

== Small Treasury Notes ==
Among the several issues of Treasury Notes of special note are the "Small Treasury Notes" authorized by the Act of February 24, 1815 which were intended to circulate as currency in the aftermath of the 1814 suspension of specie payment. The Act had been drafted during the financial disarray late in the War of 1812 and called for Notes of denomination less than $100 which would bear no interest. The issued denominations were as low as $3, their size was typical of banknotes and, unlike the previously issued Notes, they were payable to bearer rather than to order. However, they were not a Legal Tender for private transactions. Like the larger Notes issued under the February 24, 1815 Act, this issue was also supported by the government's promise to receive them at face value for purchasing bonds at par, but in the case of the Small Notes the bonds were to yield 7% interest. Before the notes could be issued, however, the war had ended – an occasion which led to the 7% bonds being worth more than par, and the Small Treasury Notes, of which $3,392,994 were originally issued, were rapidly exchanged for the bonds. In witness to the limited circulation achieved by these notes, only two issued uncancelled examples of the Small Treasury Notes are known today.

== Panic of 1837 ==
An issued, but cancelled, $100 Treasury Note from 1838, issued under the Act of October 12, 1837

The financial difficulties during the War of 1812 contributed to the Madison administration reversing its views on central banking and authorizing the chartering of the Second Bank of the United States for 20 years, 1816–1836. However, when the Jacksonian Democrats rose to power they strongly opposed the bank and began to dismantle its role in federal policy in the mid-1830s. Thus, when the Panic of 1837 struck the federal government was again without the flexibility of a central bank for its short term finances and one result was several issues of Treasury Notes when federal revenues declined during the panic.

The Act of Oct. 12, 1837 authorized $10 million of notes in denominations of at least $50. During the economic recovery in 1838/39, outstanding notes were gradually retired but the recovery failed to take hold and the panic turned into a depression which lasted through the early 1840s and several acts from 1838 to 1843 authorized further issues of Treasury Notes. Of note during this period were agitation by the Whig Party for a central bank and a flirtation with the Treasury Notes as currency. Particularly controversial was an issue by Secretary Spencer of about $850,000 of Treasury Notes endorsed with a promise for immediate repurchase, principal and interest, by the sub-treasury in New York at par in specie. Some members of the Congress complained that such Notes were dangerously close to currency. Also controversial was the practice by the Secretaries to issue some Notes with only nominal interest, a mere 1/1000 of one percent per annum, to "deposit" in private banks and then draw upon the resulting funds via checks.

== Mexican–American War ==
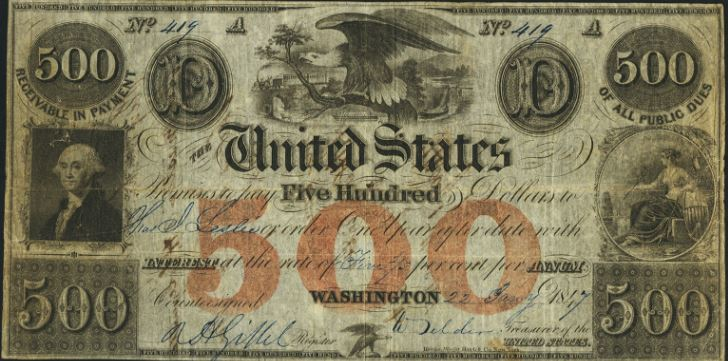
A contemporary imitation of a United States Treasury Note from the Mexican–American War; no such note was actually issued

Treasury Notes were again issued to help finance the Mexican–American War in 1846 and 1847. Including reissues, $33.8 of one year notes were issued with interest rates varying from 1/1000 of 1% to 6%.

== Panic of 1857 ==
In 1857 federal revenues suffered from the lowered rates of the Tariff of 1857 and decreased economic activity due to the Panic of 1857. At the same time outlays increased with the expensive Utah War. The government resorted to several issues of Treasury Notes from 1857 to 1860.

== Early Civil War notes ==
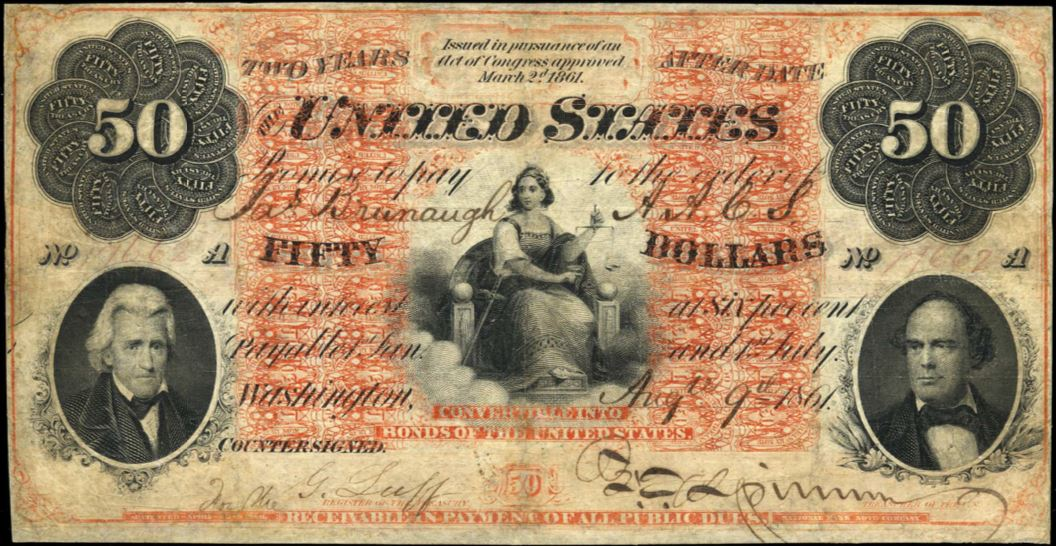
Treasury Note as authorized by the Morrill Tariff Act of 1861

The Morrill Tariff Act of March 2, 1861, signed into law by President Buchanan, authorized the Secretary of the Treasury to issue six percent interest Treasury Notes if he was unable to issue previously authorized bonds at par. Sixty-day and two-year notes were issued, payable to order, receivable in payment of all debts due to the United States, and exchangeable for bonds at par. They were first issued by President Lincoln's administration just after the Battle of Fort Sumter and until the financing authorized by Act of July 17 became available.

Only one example is known to have survived in issued and uncancelled form.

== Seven-Thirties ==
Three year Treasury Notes bearing interest at a rate of 7.30% (seven-thirty) were first authorized by the Act of July 17, 1861 to help finance the Civil War. These notes were payable to order, but the Treasury would issue them in blank form if requested. Secretary of the Treasury Chase suggested this rate of interest in hopes that the ease of interest calculation (a $50 note would accrue interest at one cent per day) would allow the notes to circulate as money, but apparently this did not prove to be the case. Further issues of Seven-Thirties were made in 1864 and 1865. The issue of 1861, which preceded the First Legal Tender Act, paid interest in gold, but the government reserved the right to pay the interest of the 1864 and 1865 issues in either United States Notes at 7.3% or in gold at 6%. The option to pay in gold, however, was never exercised.

The notes could be exchanged, at par, for 20-year United States bonds bearing interest at 6% in gold. When the 1861 issue was maturing in 1864 these bonds were trading at a premium to face value, so most holders of the seven-thirties exercised their right to make the exchange. Almost all of the 1864 and 1865 notes were similarly exchanged.

The Seven-Thirties were issued in denominations of $50, $100, $500, $1,000, and $5,000. The notes are similar in design to the Legal Tender notes of the Civil War era. Today these notes are collector's items like U.S. paper money, though no more than two or three dozen surviving examples are known.

== Demand Notes of 1861 ==
The Demand Notes were also authorized by the Act of July 17, 1861 and were a transitional issue connecting Treasury Notes to modern paper money. The denominations of the Demand Notes ($5, $10 and $20) complemented those of the Seven-Thirties ($50 to $5,000) – much in the way that the Small Treasury Notes of 1815 complemented the Large Notes. The Demand Notes had been intended to function as money, and were payable to bearer, but were authorized within the legal framework of Treasury Notes since the U.S. was not generally assumed to have the authority to issue banknotes at that time. Eventually the Demand Notes were granted legal tender status and were replaced in function by United States Notes.

When the United States Notes were issued they were not receivable in payment of taxes. The 2-year Morrill Tariff act notes and the Demand Notes were outstanding at the time and both were "Receivable in Payment of All Public Dues" and were sold at a premium to United States Notes for the payment of customs taxes. Litigation to secure a similar privilege for the Seven-Thirties was unsuccessful.

== Certificates of Indebtedness (Civil War) ==
The Act of March 1, 1862 authorized the Secretary of the Treasury to issue to public creditors certificates of denominations not less than $1,000, signed by the Treasurer, bearing interest at a rate of 6%, and payable in one year or earlier at the option of the government. While these instruments were Treasury Notes in the pre-Civil war usage of the term, they were called Certificates of Indebtedness to distinguish them from Demand Notes, United States Notes and Seven-Thirties. While these certificates traded below par in the secondary market they could be used by merchants as collateral for obtaining bank loans.

== Certificates of Indebtedness (Panic of 1907) ==
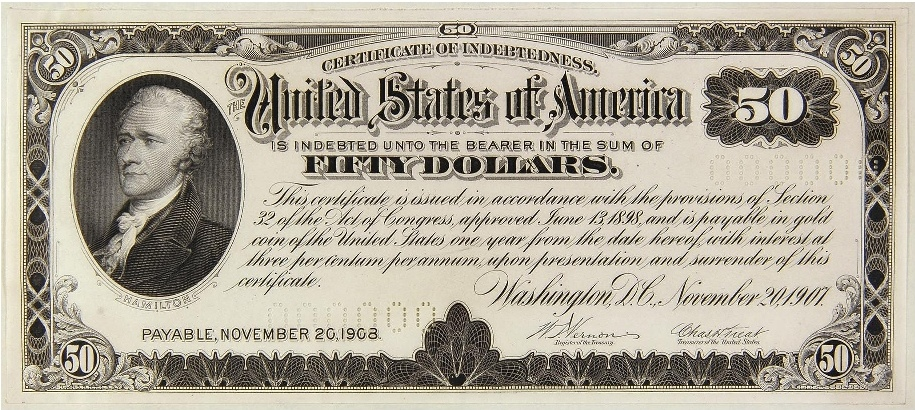
A proof of a $50 Certificate of Indebtedness of the type issued during the Panic of 1907

Authorized in 1898, Certificates of Indebtedness were issued during the Panic of 1907 to serve as backing for an increased circulation of banknotes. The Aldrich–Vreeland Act soon followed and notes of this nature ceased to be issued.
