= Obsolete denominations of United States currency =

The United States has produced several coins and banknotes of its dollar which no longer circulate or have been disused. Many of these were removed for specific reasons such as inflation reducing their value, rising minting costs, a lack of demand, or being too similar to another denomination.

== Treasury notes ==
The U.S. Dollar has numerous discontinued denominations, particularly high denomination bills, issued before and in 1934 in six denominations ranging from $500 to $100,000. Although still legal tender, most are in the hands of collectors and museums. The reverse designs featured abstract scroll-work with ornate denomination identifiers. With the exception of the $100,000 bill, these bills ceased production in 1945, and were recalled in 1969. Of these, the $100,000 was printed only as a Series 1934 gold certificate and was only used for internal government transactions. The United States also issued fractional currency for a brief time in the 1860s and 1870s, in several denominations each less than a dollar.

| Denomination | Obverse | Reverse | Portrait |
|---|---|---|---|
| 3 cent note | | | George Washington |
| 5 cent note | | | Thomas Jefferson |
| 10 cent note | | | William M. Meredith |
| 15 cent note | | | Bust of Columbia |
| 25 cent note | | | Robert Walker |
| 50 cent note | | | William Crawford |
| $500 bill | | | William McKinley |
| $1,000 bill | | | Grover Cleveland |
| $2,000 bill | | | Various historical figures |
| $5,000 bill | | | James Madison |
| $10,000 bill | | | Salmon P. Chase |
| $100,000 bill | | | Woodrow Wilson |

== Coinage ==
There have been numerous coins throughout the United States dollar's history that no longer circulate. Some, like the half-cent coin, were removed due to inflation reducing their value relative to the cost of the metal that composed the coin. Others such as the two-cent piece were removed due to a lack of demand.

Note that this table shows the latest status before the coin denomination was rendered obsolete.

| Denomination | Obverse | Reverse | Weight | Diameter | Material | Edge | Issued |
|---|---|---|---|---|---|---|---|
| Half cent ½¢ | | | 5.443 g (0.1920 oz) | 23.5 mm (0.93 in) | 100% Cu | plain | 1793–1857 |
| Large cent 1¢ | | | 10.89 g (0.384 oz) | 29 mm (1.1 in) | 100% Cu | plain | 1793–1857 |
| Two-cent piece 2¢ | | | 6.22 g (0.219 oz) | 23.00 mm (0.906 in) | 95% Cu, 5% Sn and Zn | plain | 1864–1873 |
| Trime 3¢ | | | 0.8 g (0.028 oz) | 14 mm (0.55 in) | 90% Ag, 10% Cu | plain | 1851–1873 |
| Three-cent nickel 3¢ | | | 1.94 g (0.068 oz) | 17.9 mm (0.70 in) | 75% Cu, 25% Ni | plain | 1865–1889 |
| Half dime 5¢ | | | 1.24 g (0.044 oz) | 15.5 mm (0.61 in) | 90% Ag, 10% Cu | Reeded | 1792–1873 |
| Twenty-cent piece 20¢ | | | 5 g (0.18 oz) | 22 mm (0.87 in) | 90% Ag, 10% Cu | Plain | 1875–1878 |
| Gold dollar $1 | | | 1.7 g (0.060 oz) | 14.3 mm (0.56 in) | 90% Au, 10% Cu | Reeded | 1849–1889^{α} |
| Quarter eagle $2.50 | | | 4.18 g (0.147 oz) | 18 mm (0.71 in) | 90% Au, 10% Cu | Reeded | 1795–1929^{α} |
| Three-dollar piece $3 | | | 5.01 g (0.177 oz) | 20.5 mm (0.81 in) | 90% Au, 10% Cu | Reeded | 1853–1889 |
| Half eagle $5 | | | 8.36 g (0.295 oz) | 21.6 mm (0.85 in) | 90% Au, 10% Cu | Reeded | 1795–1929^{β} |
| Eagle $10 | | | 16.7 g (0.59 oz) | 26.8 mm (1.06 in) | 90% Au, 10% Cu | Reeded | 1795–1933^{β} |
| Double eagle $20 | | | 35 g (1.2 oz) | 34 mm (1.3 in) | 90% Au, 10% Cu | Reeded | 1849–1932^{γ} |

== Notes ==
^α Some Early United States commemorative coins were minted in this denomination.
^β Some Modern United States commemorative coins are minted in this denomination.
^γ The United States government claims that it never officially released the 1933 double eagle. Examples of the coin were minted in that year, but were never released to circulation following Executive Order 6102.
