= List of banks in Timor-Leste =

This is a list of banks in Timor-Leste.

== Central bank ==
- Banco Central de Timor-Leste

== Commercial banks ==
| Full name | Call name | Licence number | Majority Owner | Capital | Website |
|---|---|---|---|---|---|
| BNU Timor | Banco Nacional Ultramarino Timor | CPO/01/2000 | Caixa Geral de Depósitos | (Portugal) | bnu.tl |
| Banco Nacional de Comércio de Timor-Leste | BNCTL | BPA/B-05/2011 | Government | (Timor-Leste) | bnctl.tl/en |
Foreign bank branch(es)
| ANZ Group, Timor-Leste Branch | ANZ Timor-Leste | CPO/B/02/2001 | ANZ Group | (Australia) | anz.com/timorleste/en |
| PT. Bank Mandiri (Persero) Tbk. Dili - Timor-Leste Branch | Mandiri Dili | BPA/B/04/2003 | Bank Mandiri | (Indonesia) | mandiridili.tl |
| PT. Bank Rakyat Indonesia (Persero) Tbk., Timor-Leste Branch | BRI Timor-Leste | BCTL/B/05/2017 | BRI | (Indonesia) | |
