= $500 =

There are many $500 banknotes, bills or coins, including:

- Nicaraguan five hundred-cordoba note
- One of the withdrawn Canadian banknotes
- One of the banknotes of the Hong Kong dollar
- One of the banknotes of Zimbabwe
- United States five-hundred-dollar bill (obsolete US currency)

Other currencies that issue $500 banknotes, bills or coins are:

- Brunei dollar
- Guyanese dollar
- Jamaican dollar
- Liberian dollar
- Singapore dollar
- New Taiwan dollar
- Cape Verdean escudo
- Argentine peso
- Chilean peso
- Colombian peso
- Cuban peso
- Dominican peso
- Mexican peso
- Uruguayan peso
