= Timor-Leste centavo coins =

East Timorese coins introduced in 2003

Centavo de Timor-Leste (Portuguese); Doit Timór-Leste nian (Tetum)
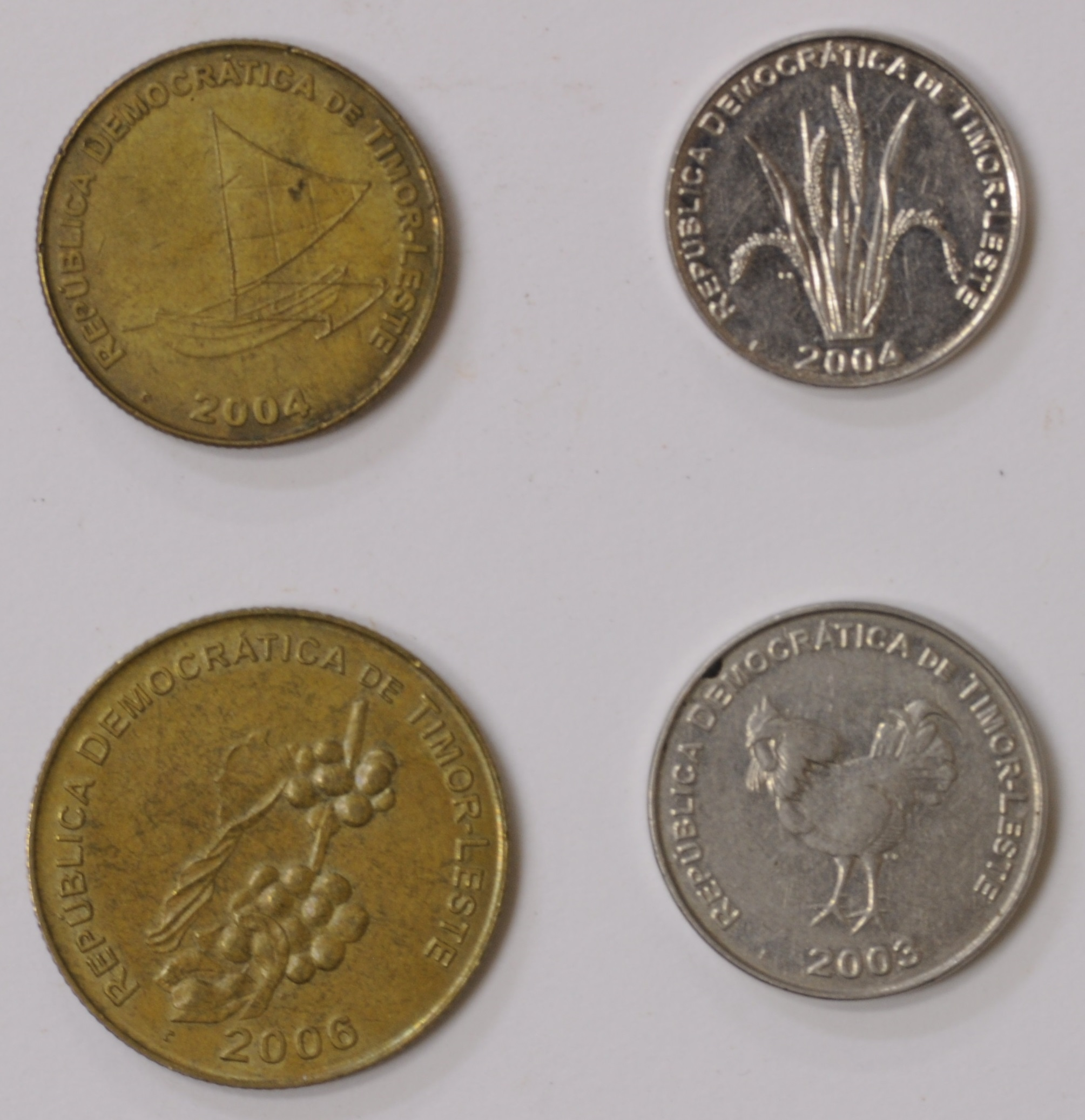
- Several East Timorese coins.

Denominations
- Superunit
- 100: United States dollar
- Banknotes: not issued^{1}
- Coins: 1, 5, 10, 25, 50, 100 and 200 centavos

Demographics
- User(s): Timor-Leste (alongside the U.S. dollar)

Issuance
- Central bank: Banco Central de Timor-Leste

Valuation
- Pegged with: United States dollar (at 1:100 ratio)
- ^{1}Banknotes of the United States dollar circulate in Timor-Leste.

Timor-Leste centavo coins were introduced in Timor-Leste (East Timor) in 2003 for use alongside United States dollar banknotes and coins, which were introduced in 2000 to replace the Indonesian rupiah following the commencement of U.N. administration. One centavo is equal to one U.S. cent. Coins issued for general circulation are in denominations of 1, 5, 10, 25 and 50 centavos and feature images of local plants and animals. In 2013 a 100 centavos coin was introduced followed by a 200 centavos coin in 2017. The higher value coins, equivalent to US$1 and US$2 respectively, were designed to reduce the expense of replacing low-denomination U.S. banknotes as they wear out. As of 2024, Timor-Leste does not yet issue its own banknotes.

The centavo coins are minted in Lisbon by the Imprensa Nacional-Casa da Moeda, the Portuguese national mint. Unlike coins issued for the Panamanian balboa or the Ecuadorian centavo, the East Timorese coins are not identical in size to their U.S. cent counterparts.

Timor-Leste centavo coins
Image		Value	Technical parameters			Description	
Reverse	Obverse	Value	Diameter	Composition	Weight	Reverse	Obverse
		1 centavo	17 mm	Nickel-coated steel	3.1 g	Nautilus shell, state title, year of emission	Value, word centavo or centavos, kaibauk representation below value, tais pattern along border
		5 centavos	18.75 mm	Nickel-coated steel	4.1 g	Rice plant, state title, year of emission	Value, word centavo or centavos, kaibauk representation below value, tais pattern along border
		10 centavos	20.75 mm	Nickel-coated steel	5.2 g	Fighting rooster, state title, year of emission	Value, word centavo or centavos, kaibauk representation below value, tais pattern along border
		25 centavos	21.25 mm	Nickel-brass	5.85 g	Traditional fishing boat (beiro), state title, year of emission	Value, word centavo or centavos, kaibauk representation below value, tais pattern along border
		50 centavos	25 mm	Nickel-brass	6.5 g	Coffee beans, state title, year of emission	Value, word centavo or centavos, kaibauk representation below value, tais pattern along border
		100 centavos	23.75 mm	Nickel-brass ring with a cupronickel center plug	7.25 g	Boaventura de Manufahi; state title, year of emission	Value, word centavo or centavos, kaibauk representation below value, tais pattern along border
		200 centavos	25.5 mm	Cupronickel ring with a brass center plug	8.46 g	Swamp buffalo in rice paddy with Matebian background; state title, year of emission	Value, word centavo or centavos, kaibauk representation below value, tais pattern along border

== See also ==
- Centavo – article about the use of centavos worldwide
- Economy of Timor-Leste
