= United States one-thousand-dollar bill =

Denomination of US currency

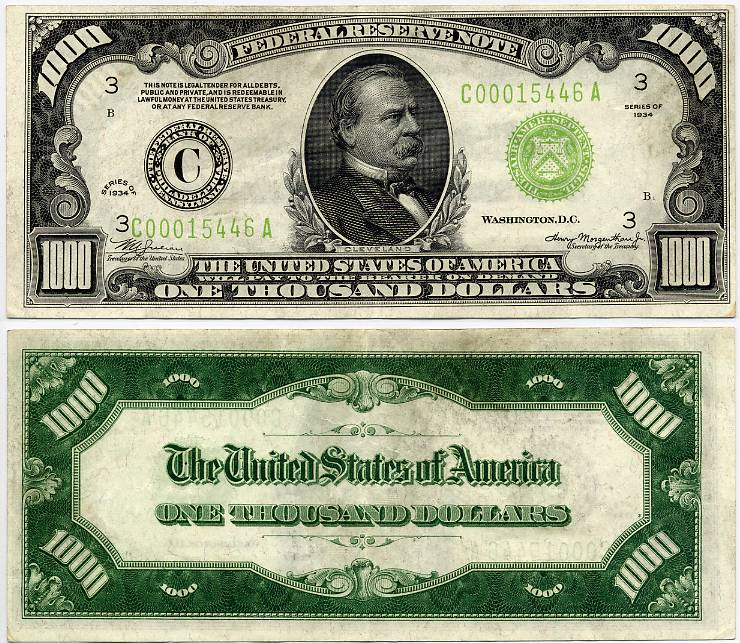
1934 US$1000 bill

The United States 1000 dollar bill (US$1000) is a denomination of United States currency. It was issued by the US Bureau of Engraving and Printing (BEP) beginning in 1861 and ending in 1934. Since 1969, Treasury policy is to withdraw any $1000 bills it receives, but they are still legal tender.

== Description ==
From 1862 to 1880, the US Treasury Department issued $1,000 Legal Tender notes, with three different designs on the obverse. The portrait of Robert Morris appeared on the first 1000 dollar bill. Governor of New York DeWitt Clinton appeared on two other versions. The obverse of the 1928 and 1934 series features a portrait of Grover Cleveland facing right while toward a United States Department of the Treasury seal.

The reverse of the 1928 and 1934 one-thousand-dollar bills feature lathework and a decorative border. The reverse also contains text that reads: "The United States of America / One Thousand Dollars" and the number 1,000.

== History ==
The United States one-thousand-dollar bill was printed from 1861 to 1934. The Bureau of Engraving and Printing (BEP) continued to issue the notes until 1969. The notes did not see much circulation among the public because they were printed to facilitate transactions between banks.

In 1878 and 1880, the Treasury produced the $1,000 bill as a silver certificate. Other subsequent versions were produced in 1878, 1880 and 1891. In 1913, a large-size version of the bill was issued as a Federal Reserve Note. In 1882, the note was issued as a gold certificate. In 1928 the treasury began to issue small-size bills and the $1,000 denomination featured US President Grover Cleveland. The small-size was issued in 1928 and 1934.

Examples of $1000 bills are valued by collectors and they regularly sell for more than their face value, particularly those with a gold seal.

On July 14, 1969, the United States Department of the Treasury announced all notes in denominations greater than US$100 would be discontinued. Since 1969, banks have been required to send any $1000 bill to the Department of the Treasury for destruction.

=== Series ===
- 1861 March, $1,000 Interest Bearing Note
- 1861 July, $1,000 Interest Bearing Note
- 1862 $1,000 Legal Tender
- 1863 $1,000 Legal Tender
- 1869 $1,000 Legal Tender
- 1870 $1,000 Gold Certificate
- 1875 $1,000 National Bank Note
- 1875 $1,000 Gold Certificate
- 1878 $1,000 Legal Tender
- 1878 $1,000 Silver Certificate
- 1880 $1,000 Legal Tender
- 1880 $1,000 Silver Certificate
- 1882 $1,000 Gold Certificate
- 1890 $1,000 Grand Watermelon
- 1891 $1,000 Silver Certificate
- 1891 $1,000 Treasury/coin note
- 1907 $1,000 Gold Certificate
- 1922 $1,000 Gold Certificate
- 1918 $1,000 Federal Reserve Note
- 1928 $1,000 Gold Certificate (gold seal)
- 1928 $1,000 Federal Reserve Note (green seal)
- 1934 $1,000 Gold Certificate (gold seal)
- 1934 $1,000 Federal Reserve Note (green seal)

== See also ==
- Large denominations of United States currency

== Gallery ==
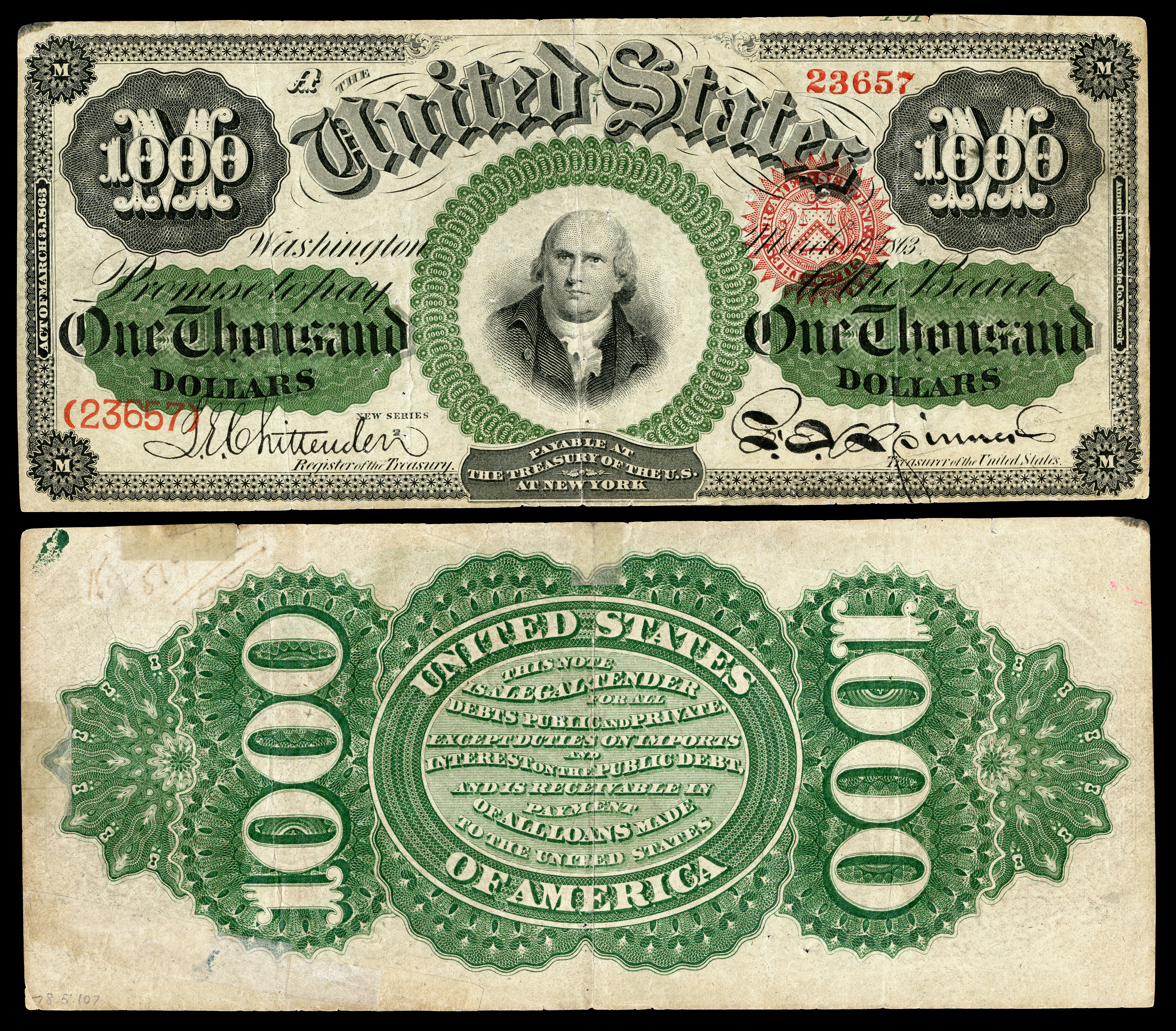
1862-3 $1,000 Legal Tender Note

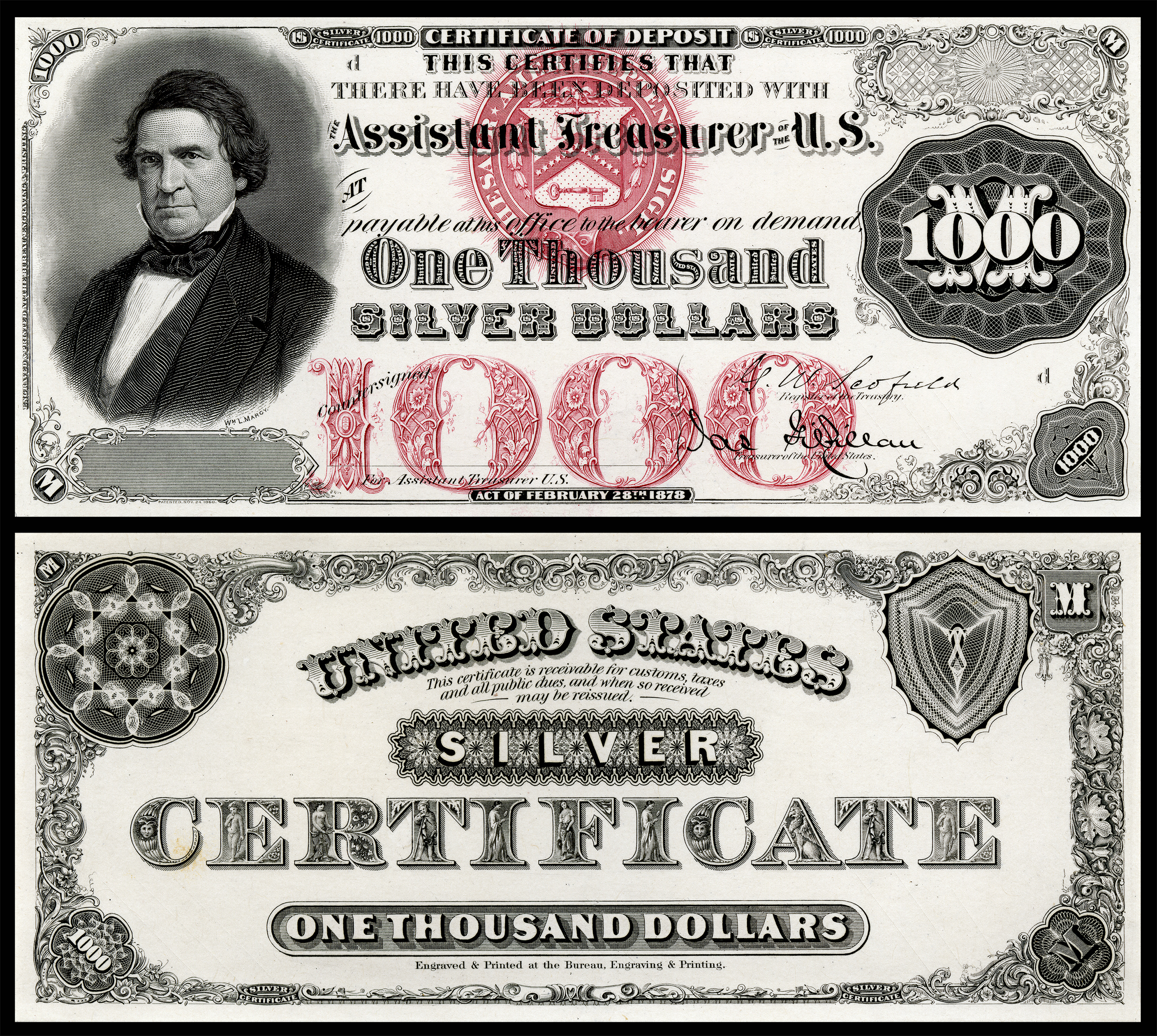
1878 $1,000 Silver Certificate Proof

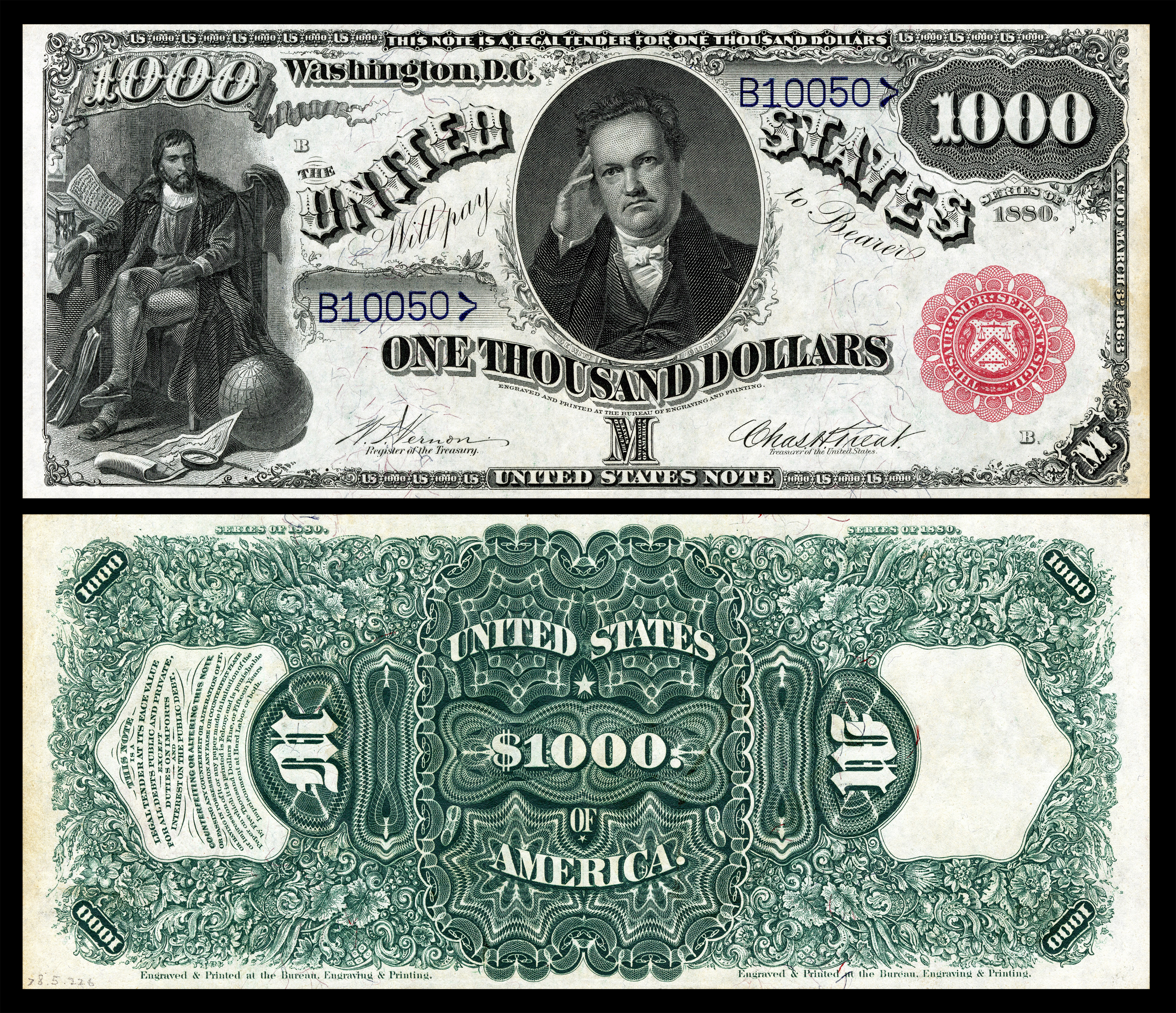
1880 $1,000 Legal Tender Note

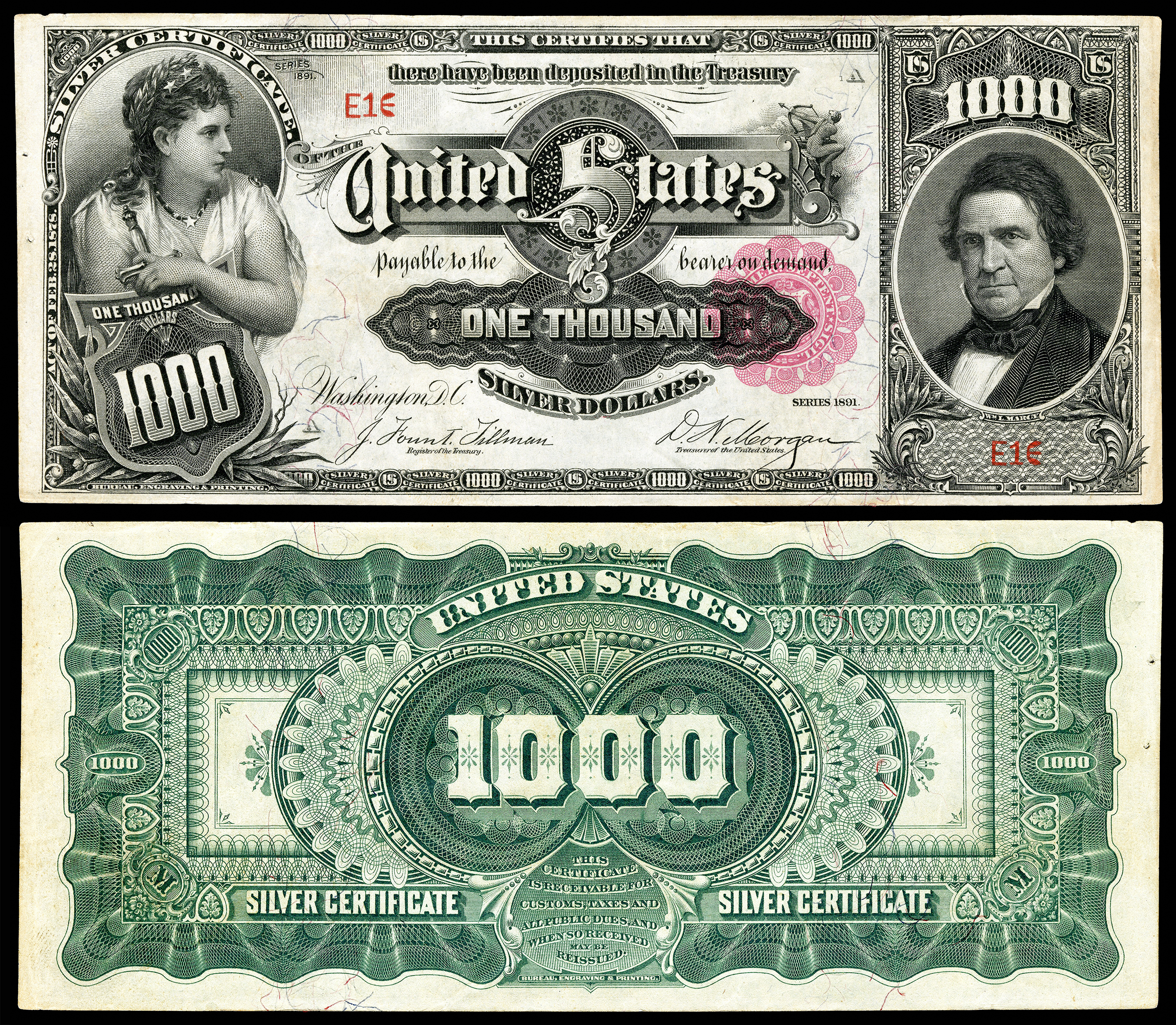
1891 $1,000 Silver Certificate

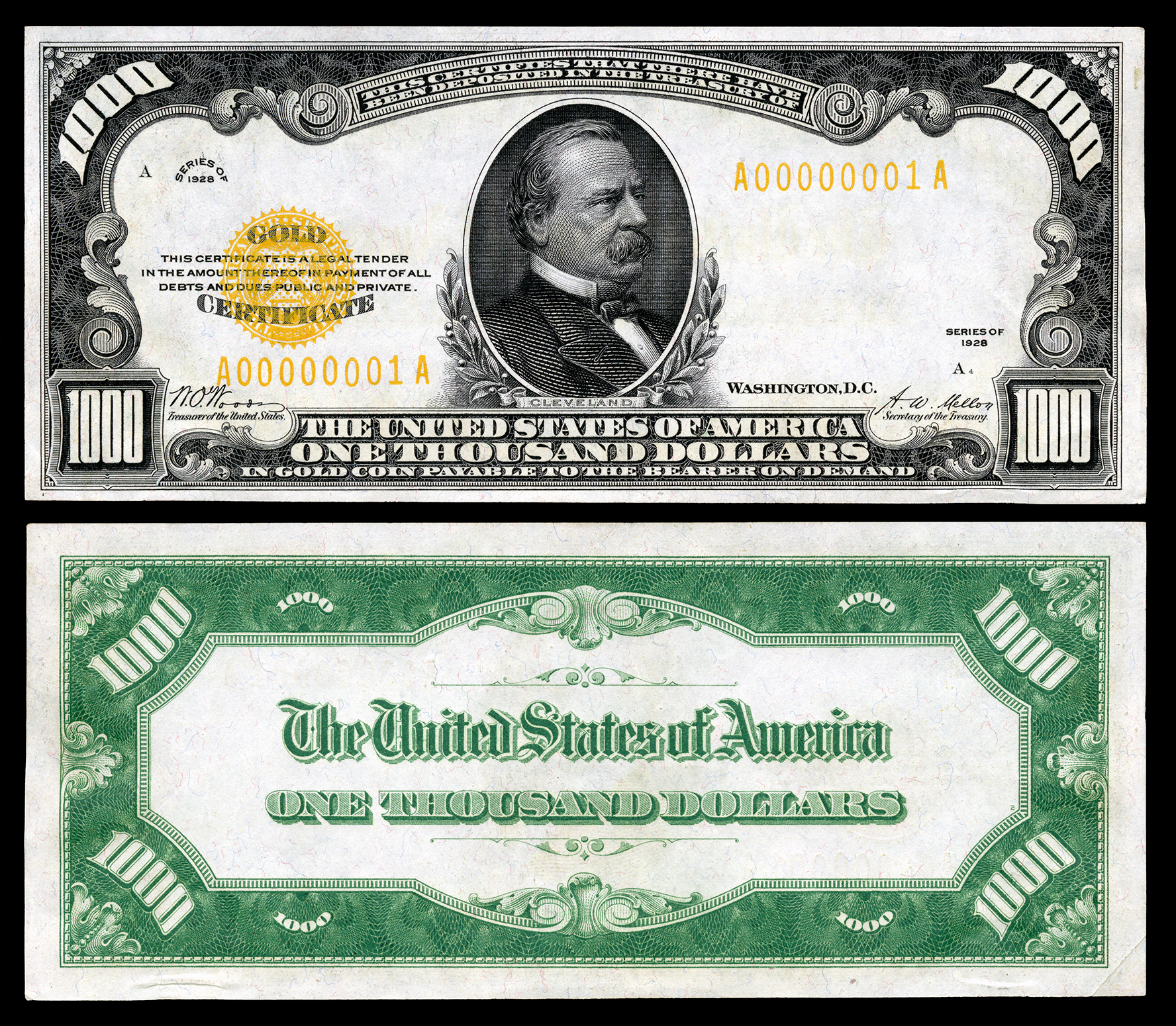
1928 $1,000 Gold Certificate
