= Banco Central de Timor-Leste =

Central Bank of Timor-Leste

Central Bank of Timor-Leste Banco Central de Timor-Leste / Banku Sentrál Timor-Leste
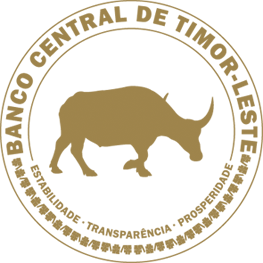

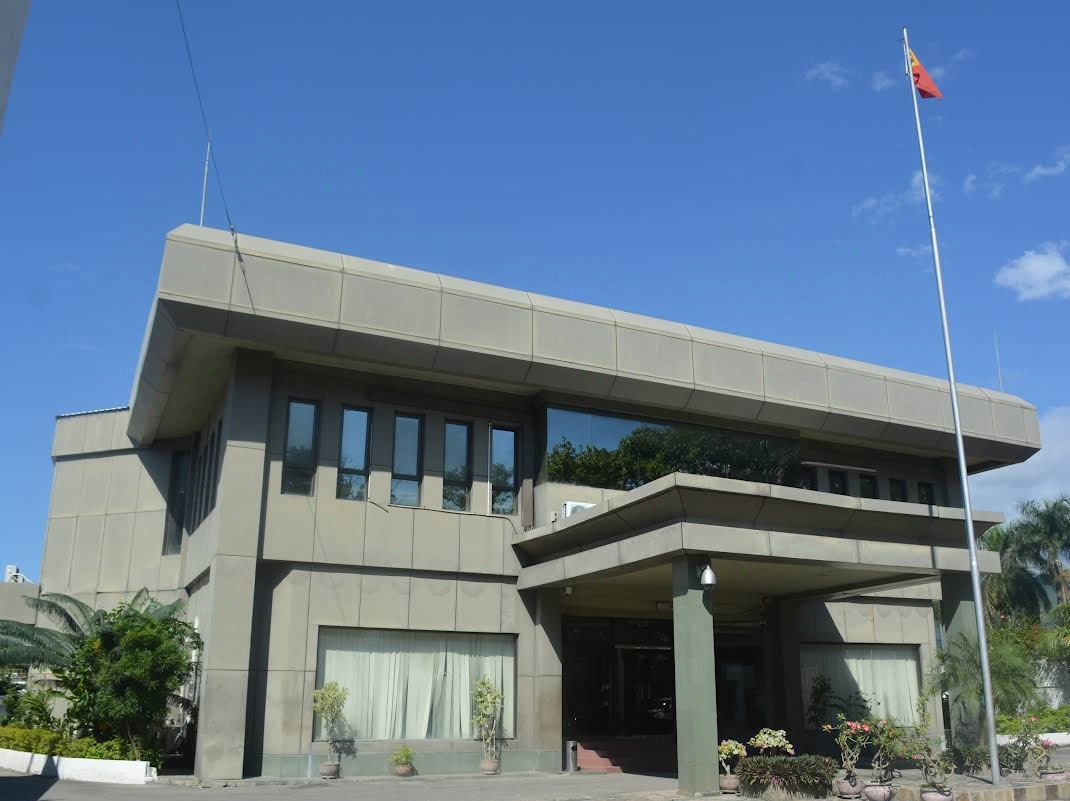
- Central bank of: Timor-Leste
- Headquarters: Avenida Xavier do Amaral No. 9, Dili, Timor-Leste
- Established: 13 September 2011
- Ownership: 100% state ownership
- Governor: Hélder Lopes
- Currency: Timor-Leste centavo coins
- Reserves: 430 million USD
- Website: www.bancocentral.tl/en

Banco Central de Timor-Leste (Portuguese: Banco Central de Timor-Leste, BCTL, lit. 'Central Bank of Timor-Leste'; Tetum: Banku Sentrál Timor Lorosa'e) is the central bank of Timor-Leste, located in its capital Dili.

BCTL was formally established on 13 September 2011, replacing the Banking and Payments Authority of Timor-Leste (BPA) and the Central Payments Office. It is responsible for the monetary policy.

The main functions:

- conducting policies to maintain domestic price stability
- fostering the liquidity and solvency of a stable market-based banking and financial system
- providing the foreign exchange policy
- promoting a safe, sound, and efficient payment system
- supporting the general economic policies of the government.

== Governors ==
Image	Name	Took office	Left office	Notes
	Abraão de Vasconcelos	September 2011	2023	
	Hélder Lopes	2023	Incumbent	

== See also ==
- List of central banks
