= Ecuadorian centavo coins =

Currency used alongside the U.S. Dollar in Ecuador

Ecuadorian centavo
centavo de dólar de Ecuador (Spanish)

ISO 4217
- Code: none not a separate currency; uses USD instead

Units of account
- Symbol: ¢
- Superunit
- 100: United States dollar

Denominations
- Banknotes: none issued^{1}
- Coins: 1, 5, 10, 25, 50 centavos

Demographics
- User(s): Ecuador (alongside the U.S. dollar)

Issuance
- Central bank: Banco Central del Ecuador
- Website: www.bce.fin.ec

Valuation
- Pegged with: United States dollar (at 1:100 ratio)
- ^{1} Ecuador also uses U.S. dollar notes and the dollar coin.

Ecuadorian centavo coins were introduced in 2000 when Ecuador converted its currency from the sucre to the U.S. dollar. The coins are in denominations of 1, 5, 10, 25 and 50 centavos and are identical in size and value to their U.S. cent counterparts (although the U.S. 50-cent coin counterpart is not often seen in circulation). They circulate within Ecuador alongside coins and banknotes from the United States. Although U.S. $1 coins are rarely used in the U.S., they are commonly used in Ecuador. Ecuador managed to introduce a $1 coin (un sucre) but finally decided to not release in common circulation, only in 2000 coin sets. Ecuador does not issue any banknotes, relying on U.S. issues.

== Description ==
Ecuadorian centavos bear the numeric value along with the value spelled out in Spanish, and the legend of the Banco Central del Ecuador; the reverse is printed with the portrait and name of a notable Ecuadorian, the legend "República del Ecuador" and the country's coat of arms. The exception is the one-cent coin, which rather than bearing a portrait, is printed with a map of the Americas and bears the legend "Luz de América" ("Light of the Americas"). Coins bear the date Año 20xx, beginning in 2000; the largest proportion of coins in circulation are from the 2000 minting. With the exception of the one-cent coin, the coins are nickel-plated steel; the "un centavo" coin is generally brass-plated steel although a few were struck in copper-plated steel. The coins are minted by the Royal Canadian Mint and the Casa de Moneda de México.

A new series of Ecuadorian coins was released in 2023. However, a substantial amount of the coinage circulating in Ecuador are U.S. issues, whose dimensions and values exactly match all of the centavo pieces. Sacagawea dollars and the succeeding Presidential dollar coins are particularly popular, and large numbers have been shipped there.

Ecuadorian centavo coin series
Image	Value	Technical parameters				Description			Date of	
Image	Value	Diameter	Thickness	Mass	Composition	Edge	Obverse	Reverse	issue	withdrawal
	1 centavo	19 mm	1.25 mm	2.5-2.55 g	Brass	Plain	"BANCO CENTRAL DEL ECUADOR", year of minting, denomination in digits and words	"REPUBLICA DEL ECUADOR", stylized image of the globe with the equator passing through Ecuador and rays emanating from Ecuador, legend "LUZ DE AMERICA" (Spanish for Light of the Americas)	10 September 2000	Current
	1 centavo	19 mm	1.45 mm	2.35 g	Copper-plated steel	Plain	"BANCO CENTRAL DEL ECUADOR", year of minting, denomination in digits and words	"REPUBLICA DEL ECUADOR", stylized image of the globe showing the Americas with the equator passing through Ecuador and rays emanating from Ecuador, legend "LUZ DE AMERICA" (Spanish for Light of the Americas)	2003	Current
	5 centavos	21.2 mm	1.9 mm	4.95 g	Stainless steel	Plain	"BANCO CENTRAL DEL ECUADOR", year of minting, denomination in digits and words	"REPUBLICA DEL ECUADOR", portrait and name of Juan Montalvo, national coat of arms	10 September 2000	Current
	10 centavos	17.9 mm	1.3 mm	2.3 g	Stainless steel	Reeded	"BANCO CENTRAL DEL ECUADOR", year of minting, denomination in digits and words	"REPUBLICA DEL ECUADOR", portrait and name of Eugenio Espejo, national coat of arms	10 September 2000	Current
	25 centavos	24.2 mm	1.75 mm	5.8 g	Stainless steel	Reeded	"BANCO CENTRAL DEL ECUADOR", year of minting, denomination in digits and words	"REPUBLICA DEL ECUADOR", portrait and name of José Joaquín de Olmedo, national coat of arms	10 September 2000	Current
	50 centavos	30.6 mm	2.1 mm	11.25 g	Stainless steel	Reeded	"BANCO CENTRAL DEL ECUADOR", year of minting, denomination in digits and words	"REPUBLICA DEL ECUADOR", portrait and name of Eloy Alfaro, national coat of arms	10 September 2000	Current
For table standards, see the coin specification table.

The Central Bank of Ecuador also produced a commemorative $1 (un sucre) coin for official 2000 mint sets. It was never released for circulation.

Ecuadorian un sucre coin
Image	Value	Technical parameters				Description			Date of	
Image	Value	Diameter	Thickness	Mass	Composition	Edge	Obverse	Reverse	issue	withdrawal
	1 sucre	30.5 mm	2.2 mm	11.25 g	Nickel-clad steel	Reeded	"BANCO CENTRAL DEL ECUADOR", year of minting, denomination in digits and words	"REPUBLICA DEL ECUADOR", portrait and name of Antonio José de Sucre, national coat of arms	2000 (official mint sets only)	Never in circulation
For table standards, see the coin specification table.

== See also ==
- Centavo - article about the use of centavos worldwide
- Currency of Ecuador
