= United States five-hundred-dollar bill =

Denomination of US currency

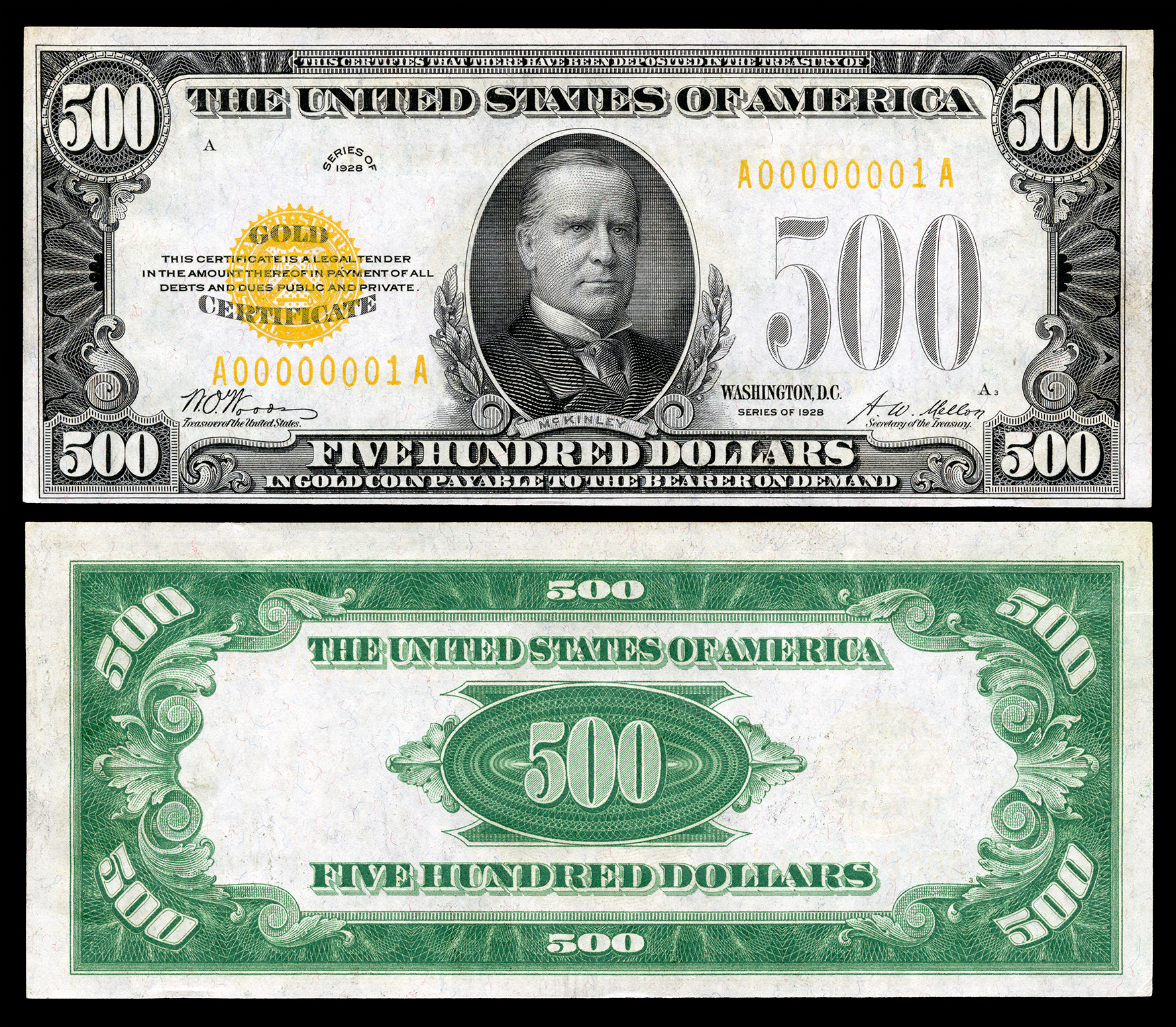
1928 US$500 Gold Certificate featuring William McKinley

The United States five-hundred-dollar bill (US$500) is an obsolete denomination of United States currency. It was printed by the US Bureau of Engraving and Printing (BEP) beginning in 1861 and ending in 1945. Since 1969, banks are required to send $500 bills to the United States Department of the Treasury for destruction.

== History ==
The United States five-hundred-dollar bill was printed from 1861 to 1945. The Bureau of Engraving and Printing (BEP) continued to issue the notes until 1969. The notes did not see much circulation among the public because they were printed to facilitate bank transactions. On July 14, 1969, the United States Department of the Treasury announced that all notes in denominations greater than US$100 would be discontinued. Since 1969, banks have been required to send any $500 bill to the Department of the Treasury for destruction.

There were several versions of the note. Chief Justice of the United States John Marshall appears on the obverse of the 1918 five-hundred-dollar bill. The note was a large-size bill measuring 8 cm (3.1 in) x 19 cm (7.5 in). A new small-size $500 bill was issued in 1928 and 1934. The new version featured former president William McKinley's portrait.

=== Efforts to reissue ===
In 2017, American economist Jay Zagorsky argued the United States should reissue the $500 bill. Zagorsky describes himself as somewhat skeptical about cultural shifts towards cashless spending and calls to eliminate the $100 bill, and also suggested the $500 could potentially be important in maintaining economic trade during times of emergency or economic crisis: "a cashless society means a country’s economy is vulnerable to anything that causes a long-term disruption in power, communications or security." He cites the example of Puerto Rico being devastated by two hurricanes in 2017, which destroyed the island's electrical distribution system and rendered credit and debit card systems useless for months.

In June 2024, Representative Paul Gosar introduced a bill into Congress which would, if passed, it would have required the Treasury to issue $500 bills featuring an image of President Donald Trump. The bill was never voted on and died when 118th Congress ended on January 3, 2025.

== See also ==
- Large denominations of United States currency

== Gallery ==
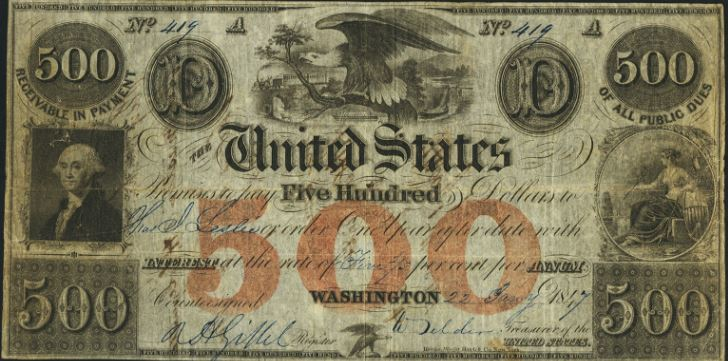
United States Treasury Note issued during the Mexican-American War

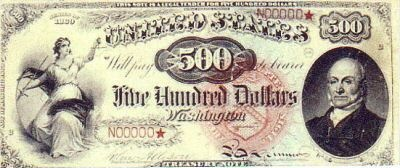
1869 US$500 Legal Tender featuring John Quincy Adams

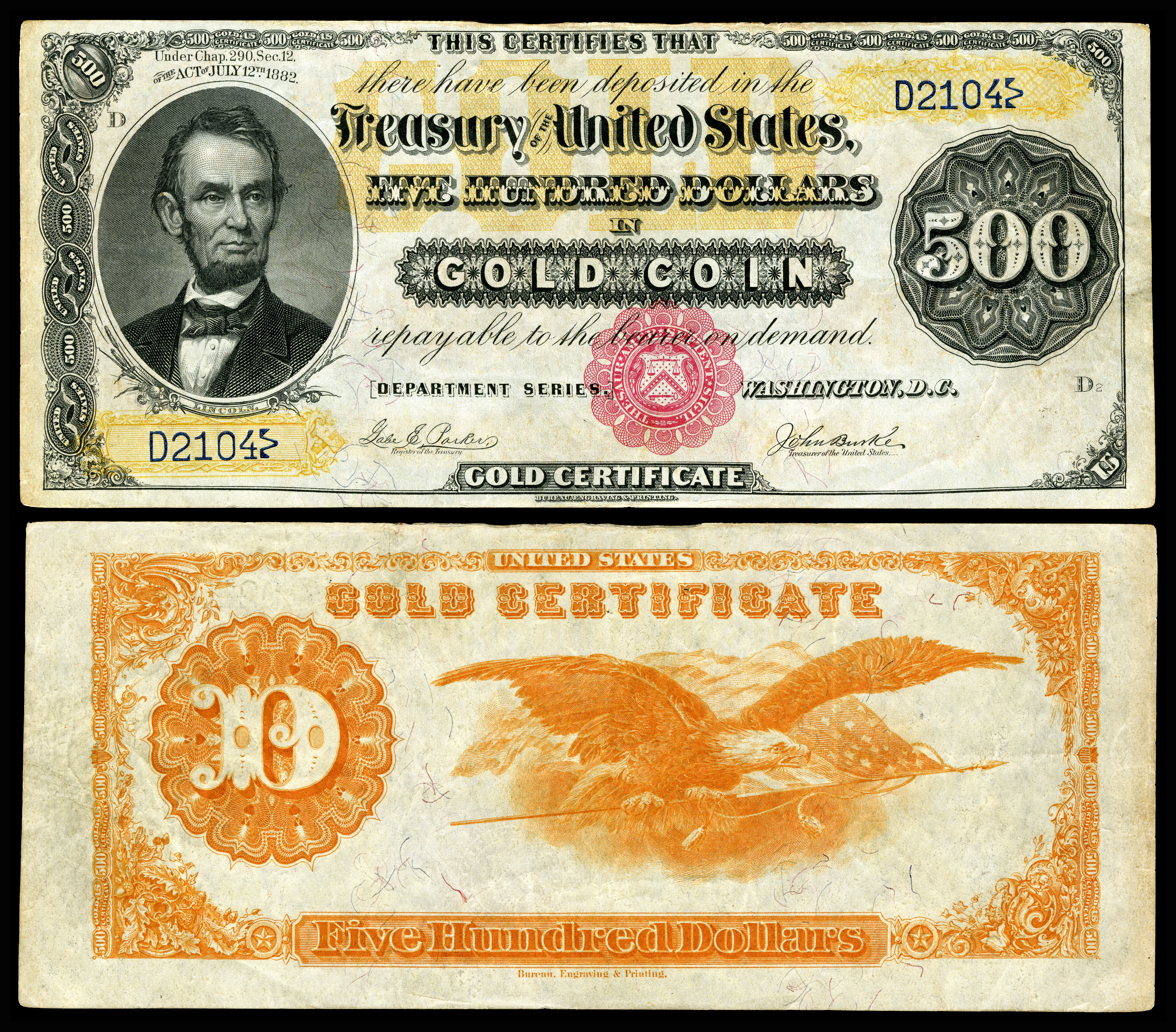
1882 US$500 gold certificate

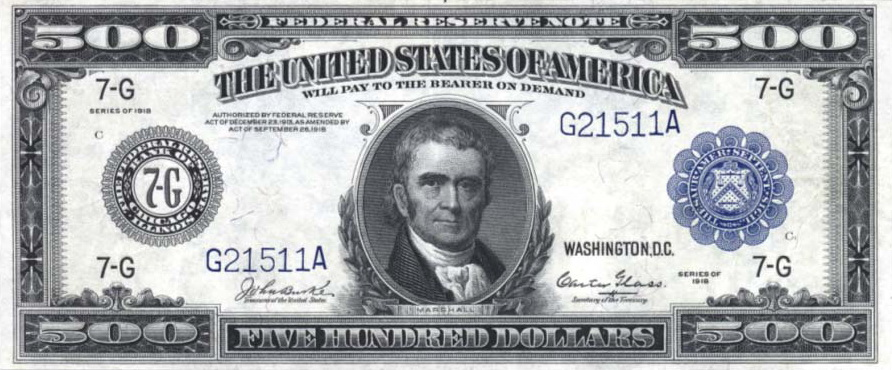
1918 US$500 featuring John Marshall
