= Strong dollar policy =

United States economic policy

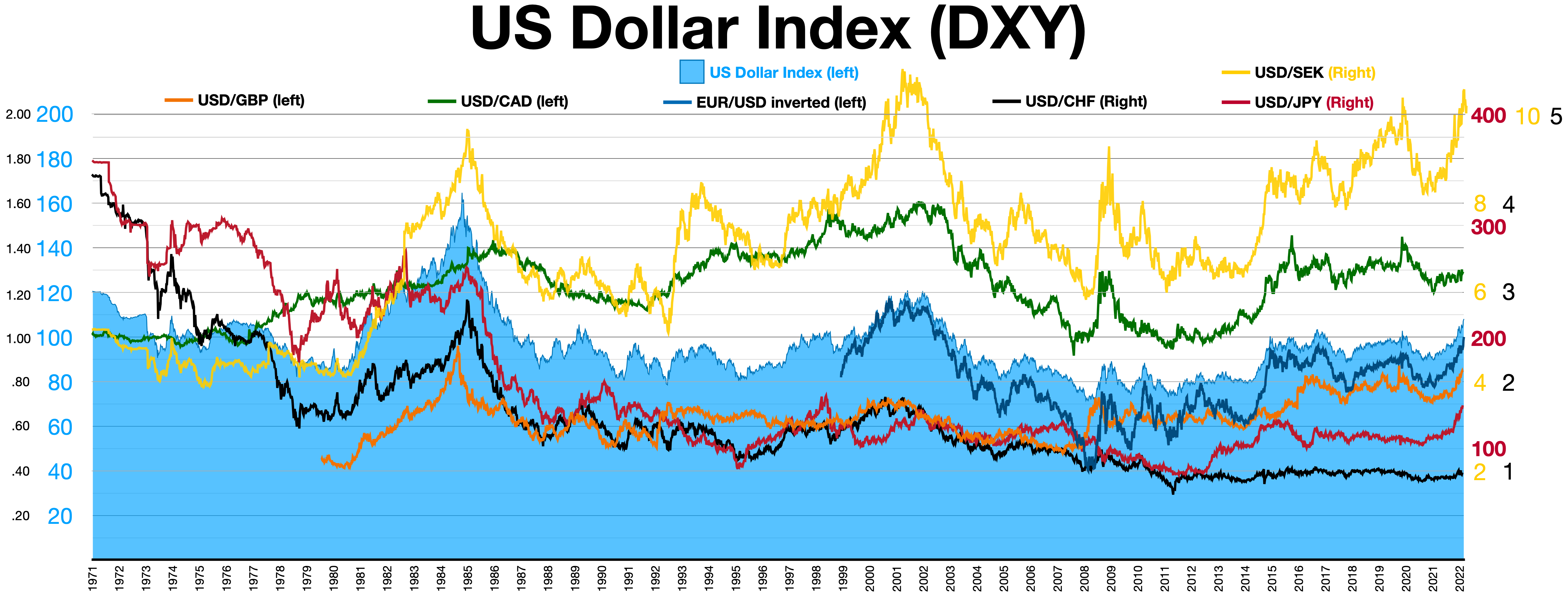
US Dollar Index (DXY) USD/GBP exchange rate USD/Canadian dollar exchange rate EUR/USD (inverted) exchange rate USD/JPY exchange rate USD/SEK exchange rate USD/CHF exchange rate

Strong dollar policy is United States economic policy based on the assumption that a "strong" exchange rate of the United States dollar (meaning it takes fewer dollars to purchase the same amount of another currency) is in the interests of the United States. In 1971, Treasury Secretary John Connally famously remarked how the US dollar was "our currency, but your problem," referring to how the US dollar was managed primarily for the US' interests despite it being the currency primarily used in global trade and global finance. A strong dollar is recognized to have many benefits but also potential downsides. Domestically in the US, the policy keeps inflation low, encourages foreign investment, and maintains the currency's role in the global financial system. Globally, a strong dollar is thought to be harmful for the rest of the world. In financial markets, the strength of the dollar is measured in the "DXY Index" (sometimes named the "USDX index"), an index which measures the exchange rate of the dollar relative to other major currencies.

== Background ==
=== What 'strong' vs. 'weak' dollar means ===
A stronger dollar benefits US importers as imports become relatively cheaper. It also benefits foreign exporters as they export products priced in dollars. Notably, a strong dollar harms US exporters as it makes exporting from the US less profitable. A stronger dollar also harms foreign importers as the cost of imports rises. When the dollar weakens, the opposite of what was just mentioned occurs.

Strong Dollar
Advantages	Disadvantages
Consumer sees lower prices on foreign product/service	U.S. firms find it harder to compete in foreign markets
Lower prices on foreign products/services help keep inflation low	U.S. firms must compete with lower priced foreign goods
U.S. consumers benefit when they travel to foreign countries	Foreign tourists find it more expensive to visit the U.S.
U.S. investors can purchase foreign stocks/bonds at lower prices	More difficult for foreign investors to provide capital to U.S. in times of heavy borrowing

Weak Dollar
Advantages	Disadvantages
U.S. firms find it easier to sell goods in foreign markets	Consumers face higher prices on foreign products/services
U.S. firms find less competitive pressure to keep prices low	Higher prices on foreign products contribute to a higher cost-of-living
More foreign tourists can afford to visit the U.S.	U.S. consumers find traveling abroad more costly
U.S. capital markets become more attractive to foreign investors	It is harder for U.S. firms and investors to expand into foreign markets

=== Status quo ===
Global use of the dollar results from the post-WW2 economic order where the United States came out of the war relatively unscathed unlike other developed nations at the time. The dollar system as it is structured today originates from the Nixon Shock, when the former Bretton Woods system ended. Global trust in the dollar results from the United States being the world's largest economy and having the most stable and liquid financial markets globally. Global demand of dollars results from most if not all trade globally being priced in dollars, meaning that countries must acquire dollars in order to import goods and countries collect dollars when they export goods. Additionally, the dollar plays a large role in global financial markets where there are many borrowers of dollars, contributing to global dollar demand. As the global 'producer' of dollars, the United States plays an important global role by providing dollars (dollar liquidity) to the rest of the world in the form of financial assets that foreigners purchase, bringing money into US financial markets. This is beneficial for the US economy as it allows the US to borrow at more favorable rates than the rest of the world. The aforementioned factors help strengthen the dollar, all else equal.

=== Exchange rate weapon ===
The term "exchange rate weapon" was introduced by School of International Service at American University Professor Randall Henning to describe the threat of manipulating the exchange rate of a strong country's currency with that of a weak country's currency, in order to extract policy adjustments from their governments and central banks. The strong dollar policy arose in response to the use of the exchange rate weapon.

== History ==
=== 1971–1973 ===
In spite of the Bretton Woods agreement, United States (U.S.) officials suspended gold convertibility and imposed a ten percent surcharge on imports in August 1971. This prompted the G-10 Smithsonian Agreement, a temporary agreement negotiated in 1971 among the ten leading developed nations in the world. The agreement pegged the Japanese yen, the Deutsche Mark, and the British pound sterling and French franc at seventeen percent, fourteen percent, and nine percent, respectively, below the Bretton Woods parity. These proved unsustainable. Later in 1971, U.S. officials permanently floated the dollar; a second devaluation of the dollar against major currencies and a permanent “float” of major European currencies against the dollar followed in February 1973. When the dollar fell in value, the U.S. did little to slow or reverse the fall; this dollar slump incentivized European and Japanese officials to deliver expansionary policies.

=== 1977–1978 ===
In 1977 the Carter administration advocated and initiated the “locomotive theory”, which posits that big economies pull along their smaller brethren. Carter’s theory asked for concessions from the smaller countries to benefit the U.S. for the high price the U.S. has incurred for their benevolence after the 1973-75 recession. The American initiative met with staunch German and Japanese resistance at first. In response, U.S. authorities let it be known that they would allow the dollar to depreciate against the dissenting countries' currencies in the absence of macroeconomic stimuli. Eventually, Japanese prime minister Takeo Fukuda agreed to the U.S. stimulus request in late 1977. A year later at the Bonn Economic Summit in July 1978, German Chancellor Helmut Schmidt acceded to expansionary fiscal policy as a part of a package of mutual concessions.

=== 1980–1985 ===
There was a twenty-six percent appreciation of the dollar between 1980 and 1984 as the result of a combination of tight monetary policy during the 1980-82 period under Federal Reserve Chairman Paul Volcker and expansionary fiscal policy associated with Ronald Reagan's administration during the 1982-84 period. The combination of these events pushed up Long-term interest rates, which in turn attracted a capital inflow and appreciated the U.S. dollar. The 1981-84 Reagan administration had an explicit policy of "benign neglect" toward the foreign exchange market. Some U.S. trade partners expressed concerns over the magnitude of the dollar's appreciation, advocating for intervention in the foreign exchange market in order to dampen such moves. However, Secretary of the Treasury Donald Regan and other administration officials rejected these notions, arguing that a strong dollar was a vote of confidence in the U.S. economy. At the Versailles Summit of G-7 leaders in 1982, the U.S. agreed to the requests of other member nations to allow an expert study of the effectiveness of foreign exchange interventions. The eponymous "Jurgenson Report", named after its lead researcher Phillipe Jurgenson, was submitted to the 1983 Williamsburg Summit where the requesting nations were disappointed that the findings did not support their advice. Only slightly deterred, the Plaza Accords in 1985 occurred. (The Plaza Accords were an impetus for the G-7 Finance Ministers as the group of officials that had met in New York were the first officials for it.) However, the U.S. began “talking down” the dollar further in order to encourage stimuli to domestic demand in Japan and Germany.

=== 1990s ===
In 1992, following a recession with a slow recovery and a delayed response in the labor markets, Bill Clinton's administration signaled the desirability of yen appreciation against the dollar: "I would like to see a stronger yen.” Also, in February 1993, then-Treasury Secretary Lloyd Bentsen reiterated the position when he was asked if he'd like to see a weaker dollar. These comments were to influence the USDJPY so as to protect against Japanese export-growth at the expense of the U.S. current account position. Afterwards, the dollar slumped against the yen, moving the yen to the 100 level against the dollar in the 1993 summer.

== Inception of the current policy ==
In 1995 in response to the ailing dollar, on 25 April the G-7 Finance Ministers and Central Bank Governors released a statement from their meeting in Washington, D.C. calling for the orderly appreciation of the dollar:

“The ministers and governors expressed concerns about recent developments in exchange markets. They agreed that recent movements have gone beyond the levels justified by underlying economic conditions in the major countries. They also agreed that orderly reversal of those movements is desirable, would provide a better basis for the continued expansion of international trade and investment, and would contribute to our common objectives of sustained non-inflationary growth. They further agreed to strengthen their efforts in reducing internal and external imbalances and to continue to cooperate closely in exchange markets.”

Replacing Treasury Secretary Lloyd Bentsen early in December 1994, Robert E. Rubin responded to the dollar’s depreciation with: “A strong dollar is in our national interest.” Thus, in 1995, Rubin re-set U.S. dollar policy, stating, in paraphrase: The strong-dollar policy is a U.S. government policy based on the assumption that a strong exchange rate of the dollar is both in the U.S. national interest and in the interest of the rest of the world. Rubin further emphasized that it “wouldn’t be used as a tool for trade." In essence, the strong dollar policy was seen as a way to assure investors that Washington would not intervene in exchange markets to debase the currency, a de-weaponization of the foreign exchange market, as Marc Chandler says. Robert Rubin’s motivation for introducing the strong dollar policy revolved around his desire to keep U.S. bond yields low, and to avoid criticism from trade partners that America was deliberately devaluing its currency to boost exports. Initially, the rhetoric helped the dollar rise by thirty percent between 1995 and 2002, but some assert that this had more to do with U.S. monetary tightening and the Dot-com bubble than any deliberate policy initiatives. Nevertheless, the dollar underwent an extraordinary revival since hitting lows in April 1995, rising more than 50 percent against the yen and nearly 20 percent against the mark by 1997 — with an appreciation of 7.5 percent against the yen and 8.7 percent against the mark from 1 January 1997 to 7 February 1997.

== 21st century ==
Since its inception, the strong dollar policy has usually consisted as periodic statements by government officials insisting that the U.S. continues to pursue a strong dollar. However, the status quo is not always adhered to. For example, during the World Economic Forum in Davos, Switzerland, Secretary of the Treasury Steven Mnuchin was quoted saying "a weak dollar is good for U.S. trade", which was an impetus for a one percent drop in the U.S. Dollar Index by six days later.

== See also ==
- Dissolution of the Soviet Union
- Hard currency
- International use of the U.S. dollar
- Superdollar (economics)
