= Kaplan Arena =

Building in Virginia, United States

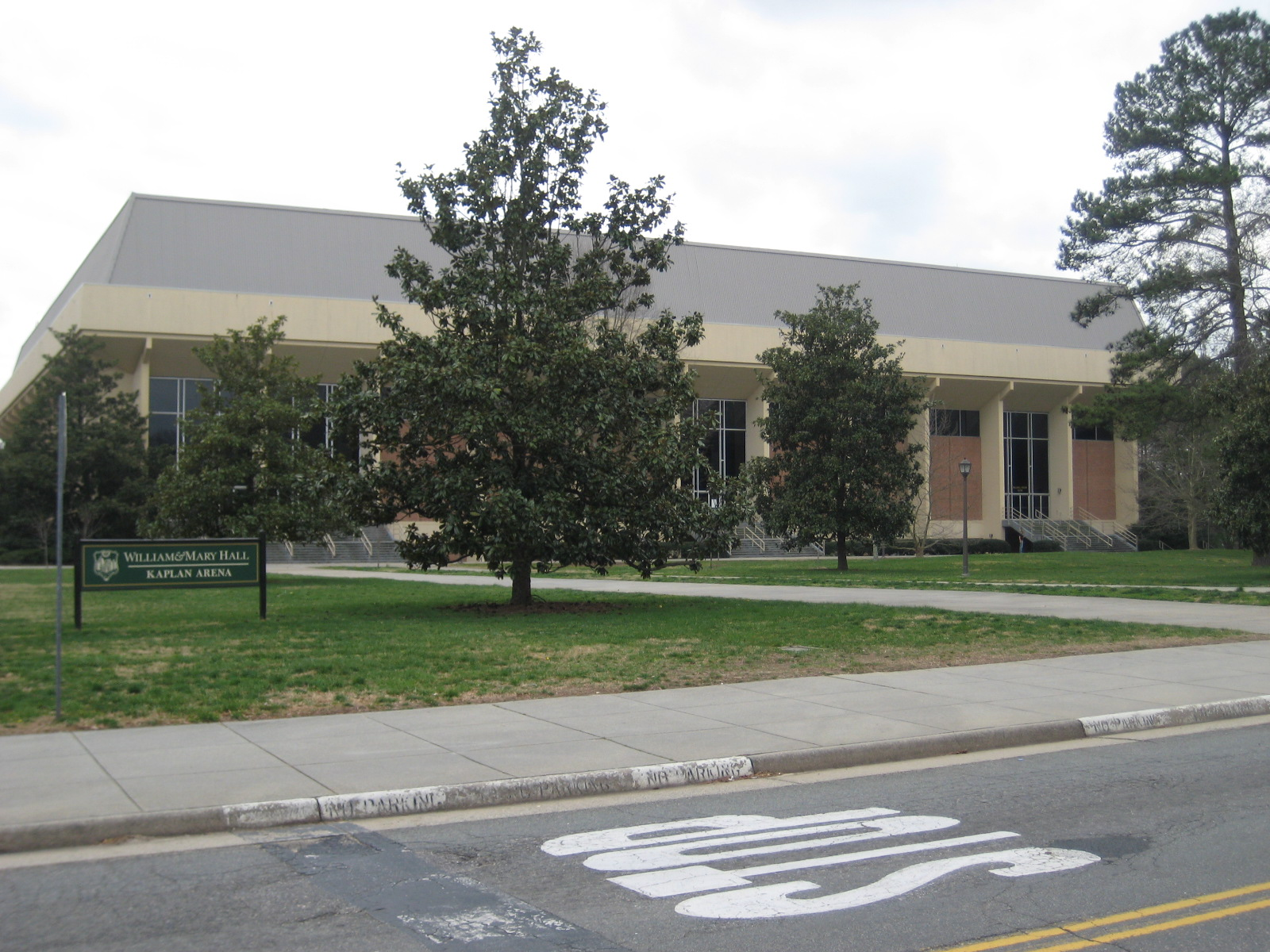
- Interactive map of Kaplan Arena
- Full name: Kaplan Arena at William and Mary Hall
- Former names: William & Mary Hall (1971-2005)
- Location: 751 Ukrop Way, Williamsburg, VA 23186
- Coordinates: 37.273472°N 76.719625°W
- Owner: College of William & Mary
- Capacity: 11,300

Construction
- Opened: December 5, 1971
- Cost: $5.3 million ($43.9 million in 2025 dollars)
- General contractor: Southeastern Construction Company

Tenant
- William & Mary Tribe (NCAA) (1971–present)

Kaplan Arena is a building used for athletic events for the William & Mary Tribe sports teams at the College of William & Mary in Williamsburg, Virginia. The building contains an 8,600-seat arena, which can seat 11,300 with extra bleachers. The arena's floor measures almost 24,000 square feet (2,200 m^{2}). The building was formerly known as William & Mary Hall. From 2005 to 2016, only the arena proper was called Kaplan Arena, before the entire building was renamed to honor alumni Jane Thompson Kaplan and Jim Kaplan.

The building's lower level houses the coaching and staff offices for the school's athletic department. It also hosts a seminar room, medical suite, and a gymnastics workout area. Completed in 17 months by the Southeastern Construction Company of Charlotte, North Carolina, the building cost $5.3 million but was financed by state revenue bonds.

== History ==
Its name was granted in 2005 as part of a publicized funding effort by then-college president Gene Nichol, initially applying only to the arena proper. Between the 1920s and 1970s, the William & Mary Indians played basketball in Blow Gym, which now houses the registrar, bursar, and other university offices. It hosted the last ECAC South men's basketball tournament in 1985 (the conference added more championships in the 1985–86 school year and was renamed the CAA). Retired jersey banners depicting some of W&M's own basketball greats hang from the rafters of Kaplan Arena. The arena opened in 1971 and is home to the Tribe basketball, gymnastics and volleyball teams.

The Harlem Globetrotters and roller derby, as well as other sports and entertainment acts, have also utilized Kaplan Arena as a venue over the years. "[People] in the Williamsburg area have seen auto shows, dog shows, Prince Charles, Glenn Close, a Billy Graham crusade, Bette Midler, Billy Joel, the 1976 televised presidential debates between candidates Jimmy Carter and Gerald Ford, the Shakespeare Players, a three-ring circus, and even a Howdy Doody show." It also hosted the 9th G7 summit in 1983 for some of the world's political leaders, including Ronald Reagan, Margaret Thatcher, and François Mitterrand. The Dalai Lama visited William & Mary on October 11, 2012, and spoke to a crowd of over 8,000 people at Kaplan Arena.

The first event held at the Kaplan Arena was a basketball game between the William & Mary Indians against the top 5 ranked University of North Carolina Tar Heels. The event took place before construction of the building was complete. The most noticeable thing lacking during that game were doors on the back of the arena. Photos of the game show the sold out crowd dressed in winter coats and hats. The Tar Heels opted to spend halftime on their team bus as opposed to the unfinished locker room. North Carolina won the game 101-72.

The first musical concert in Kaplan Arena, performed in 1971, was by Sly & the Family Stone. The record for the largest crowd to attend a concert was 13,514 for The Police on January 25, 1982. Other notable performers have included Bruce Springsteen, The Pretenders, My Chemical Romance, Muse, R.E.M., Sting, The Roots, The Grateful Dead, who have played at the college four times, Nirvana, The Chainsmokers, Williamsburg native Bruce Hornsby, 10,000 Maniacs, Beach Boys, Chicago, the Stone Temple Pilots, and Kendrick Lamar.

== See also ==
- List of NCAA Division I basketball arenas
