= Stephen M. Hsu =

American engineer and materials scientist

- Citizenship: American
- Education: Virginia Tech (BS); Pennsylvania State University (MS, PhD)
- Known for: Tribochemistry; wear maps; nanolubrication; ceramic tribology
- Awards: Captain Alfred E. Hunt Memorial Medal; Al Sonntag Award; U.S. Department of Commerce Silver Medal
- Scientific career
- Fields: Materials science, Tribology, Tribochemistry, Nanotribology
- Workplaces: National Institute of Standards and Technology; George Washington University; City University of Hong Kong

Stephen M. Hsu is an American engineer, materials scientist, inventor, and emeritus professor. He is recognized for his contributions to materials science and tribology, particularly for pioneering research in tribochemistry, the study of chemical reactions occurring between materials in relative motion under load. He has held senior research positions at the National Institute of Standards and Technology (NIST), served in international academic leadership roles, and was a distinguished professor at George Washington University. He holds more than 20 patents.

Hsu's research focuses on the interaction of materials with their environments and with other materials across nano- to macroscopic scales. His work has enabled advances in the lubrication of unconventional materials, such as ceramics, carbon composites, and glass, under extreme environments, including space applications.

Hsu has authored more than 270 technical publications, including over 120 peer-reviewed journal articles and 84 peer-reviewed conference papers. His publications have received over 8,200 citations, with an h-index of 49. He holds more than 20 U.S. and international patents.

== Early life and education ==
Hsu earned a Bachelor of Science in chemical engineering from Virginia Tech in 1968, followed by a Master of Science and Ph.D. in engineering from Pennsylvania State University. His doctoral research developed an experimental method to measure molecular reaction temperatures generated during sliding contact under load. By applying chemical kinetics to trace organometallic reaction products, he produced the first experimental measurements of flash temperatures in sliding interfaces.

For this work, Hsu received the Captain Alfred E. Hunt Memorial Medal from the Society of Tribologists and Lubrication Engineers (STLE) in 1980.

== Career ==
Hsu began his professional career in 1974 as a research engineer at Amoco Chemicals Corporation, where he studied how material properties influence lubricant additive performance. In 1978, he joined the National Bureau of Standards (later NIST) to lead a U.S. Congressional mandate establishing recycled oil equivalency standards and test methods.

In 2007, Hsu joined the City University of Hong Kong as a chaired professor and head of the Department of Manufacturing Engineering and Engineering Management. In 2009, he returned to the United States as professor of engineering and applied science in the Department of Mechanical and Aerospace Engineering at George Washington University, where he led the GWU Energy Initiative until his retirement in 2023. He continues research activities as professor emeritus and research professor. He has also served as an adjunct professor at the University of Maryland and Pennsylvania State University.

== Research and contributions ==
Hsu is known for foundational work in tribochemistry, particularly in characterizing molecular-scale interactions between lubricants and material surfaces. He identified the formation of organometallic compounds during sliding contact and proposed the "optimum reactivity" model, describing the balance between protective film formation and material wear. His research on water–ceramic interactions under tribological stress earned him the Al Sonntag Award from STLE in 1989.

He developed the concept of the wear map, a graphical method for identifying safe operating regimes for brittle materials under wear conditions, along with predictive wear models for ceramic materials. These methods remain widely used in materials selection and mechanical design. Hsu also contributed to chemically assisted machining of ceramics, demonstrating how alcohol-based processes could improve tool life and reduce surface damage; these methods were later adopted in commercial manufacturing.

In biomaterials research, Hsu developed accelerated wear tests for joint replacement materials that replicated cross-shear motion. His findings on the shape-dependent biological response to polyethylene wear particles influenced testing standards and design practices. He collaborated with the U.S. Food and Drug Administration and medical device manufacturers to develop standard reference materials and testing protocols.

== International leadership in materials standards ==
In the 1980s, Hsu helped establish an International Energy Agency (IEA) Implementing Agreement on Advanced Materials, coordinating round-robin testing of ceramic powders and components across 48 organizations from the U.S., Germany, Sweden, Japan, and the U.K. This work led to de facto international standards for ceramic measurement and the creation of around 85 formal standards. He also represented the U.S. in the Versailles Project on Advanced Materials and Standards (VAMAS), a G7 initiative, and served as its Chair from 2004, expanding participation to China and Southeast Asia and broadening the scope to nanomaterials and quality control.

== Awards and honors ==
Hsu is a Fellow of STLE and the American Society of Mechanical Engineers (ASME). His honors include the Captain Alfred E. Hunt Memorial Medal, the Al Sonntag Award, and the U.S. Department of Commerce Bronze Medal (1983) and Silver Medal (1990). He has received Best Paper of the Year awards three times (1980, 1989, and 2014).

== Selected publications ==
- Hsu, S. M.; Ying, C.; Zhao, F. (2014). "The Nature of Friction: A Critical Assessment." Friction 2 (1): 1–26.
- Hsu, S. M. (2004). "Nanolubrication: Concept and Design." Tribology International 37 (7): 537–545.
- Hsu, S. M.; Shen, M. C.; Munro, R. (2002). "Wear in Boundary Lubrication." Proceedings of the Institution of Mechanical Engineers, Part J 216 (6): 427–441.
- Gachot, C.; Rosenkranz, A.; Hsu, S. M.; Costa, H. L. (2017). "A Critical Assessment of Surface Texturing for Friction and Wear Improvement." Wear 372: 21–41.
- Hsu, S. M.; Gates, R. S. (2005). "Boundary Films: Formation and Lubrication Mechanisms." Tribology International 38 (3): 305–312.
- Hsu, S. M.; Shen, M. C. (2004). "Wear Prediction of Ceramics." Wear 256 (7–8): 867–878.
- Zhang, J.; Hsu, S. M.; Liew, Y. F. (2007). "Nanolubrication: Patterned Lubricating Films Using Ultraviolet Irradiation on Hard Disks." Journal of Nanoscience and Nanotechnology 7 (1): 286–292.
