= Federal Institute for Materials Research and Testing =

German material research institute

BAM
- Federal Institute for Materials Research and Testing
- Bundesanstalt für Materialforschung und -prüfung
- Abbreviation: BAM
- Formation: 1871
- Type: Standards organization
- Legal status: Government agency
- Purpose: Chemical and materials safety
- Headquarters: Unter den Eichen 87, Steglitz
- Location: D-12205 Berlin, Germany
- Region served: Germany
- Official language: DE, EN
- Parent organization: Federal Ministry for Economic Affairs and Climate Action
- Staff: 1700
- Website: BAM

The Federal Institute for Materials Research and Testing (German: Bundesanstalt für Materialforschung und -prüfung), or BAM, is a German research institute in the field of materials science.

== History ==
The institute's origins start in 1871, the year in which Germany was unified, as the Mechanisch-Technische Versuchsanstalt. From 1904 to 1919 it was styled the Königliches Materialprüfungsamt. From 1920 to 1945 it was called the Staatliches Materialprüfungsamt (MPA). And from 1919 to 1945 there existed the Chemisch-Technische Reichsanstalt (CTR).

In 1954 the Bundesanstalt für mechanische und chemische Materialprüfung was founded, becoming the Bundesanstalt für Materialprüfung in 1956. In 1969 it became a government agency (Bundesoberbehörde). In 1986 the name changed to Bundesanstalt für Materialforschung und -prüfung.

== Function ==
Within the interconnected fields of materials, chemistry, environment, and safety, the main areas of focus are:

- Statutory functions relating to technical safety in the public domain, especially as regards dangerous materials and substances
- Collaboration in developing statutory regulations, for example on safety standards and threshold values
- Advising the Federal Government and industry on safety aspects of materials and chemical technology
- The development and supply of reference materials and methods, in particular for chemical analysis and materials testing
- Assisting in the development of standards and technical regulations for the evaluation of substances, materials, structures, and processes with reference to damage prediction and preservation of national economic values.

== Structure ==
The institution is controlled by the German Federal Ministry for Economic Affairs and Climate Action. Its competences are to improve safety in technology and chemistry through research and development, testing, analysis, approvals, advice, and information.

The headquarters are located in Berlin, near the Berlin Botanischer Garten station.

=== Departments ===
The Federal Institute for Materials Research and Testing is subdivided into departments and divisions. The staff sums up to about 1700 members.

- Department 1: Analytical chemistry, Reference materials
- Department 2: Process and plant safety
- Department 3: Containment systems for dangerous goods; Energy storage
- Department 4: Materials and the environment
- Department 5: Materials engineering
- Department 6: Materials chemistry
- Department 7: Safety of structures
- Department 8: Non-destructive testing
- Department 9: Component safety
- Department S: Quality infrastructure
- Department Z: Central services

== See also ==
- Institute for Reference Materials and Measurements
- VAMAS (Versailles Project on Advanced Materials and Standards)
