= Superdollar (economics) =

Period of extreme strength of the United States dollar

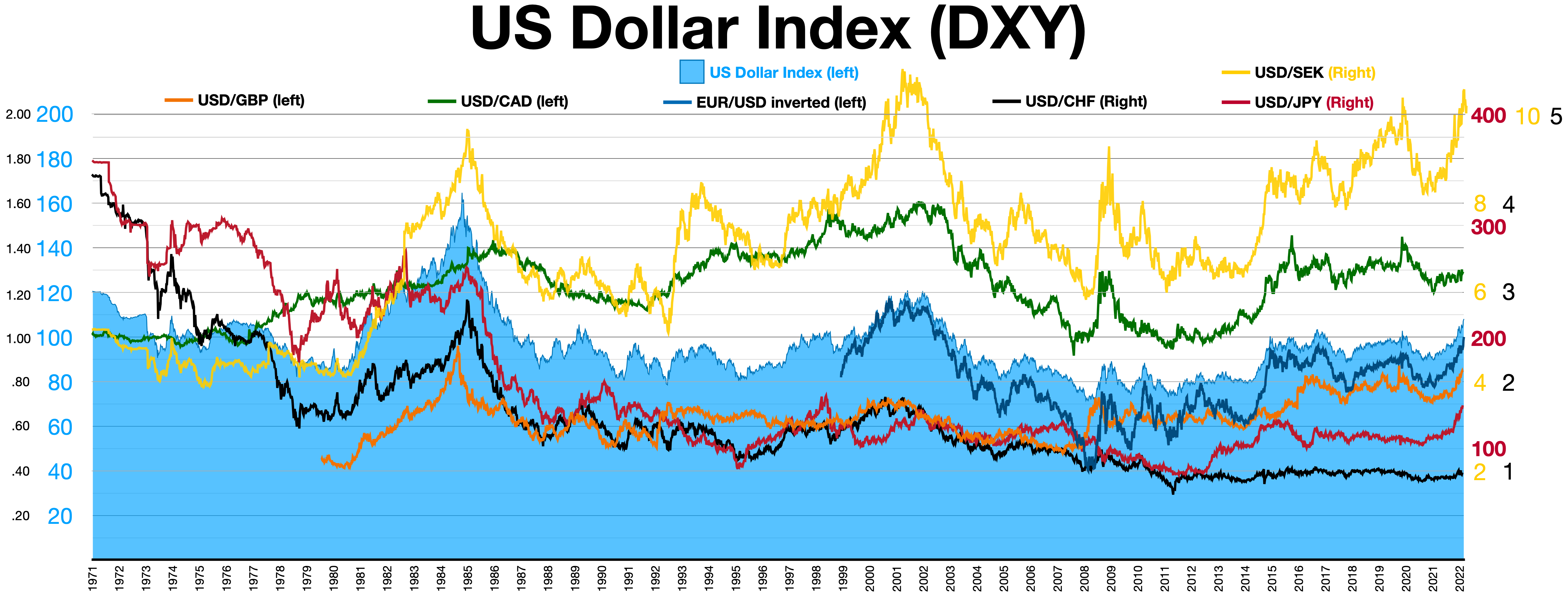
US Dollar Index (DXY) USD/GBP exchange rate USD/Canadian dollar exchange rate EUR/USD (inverted) exchange rate USD/JPY exchange rate USD/SEK exchange rate USD/CHF exchange rate

The term superdollar is sometimes used to refer to a period of extreme strength of the United States dollar, relative to other currencies, particularly in the 1980s. This period ended when the G7 countries, concerned about the American trade deficit and the resulting protectionism, agreed to cooperate in the devaluation of the dollar in the Plaza Accord.
