= Ernest Hondros =

British material scientist

Ernest Hondros CMG FRS
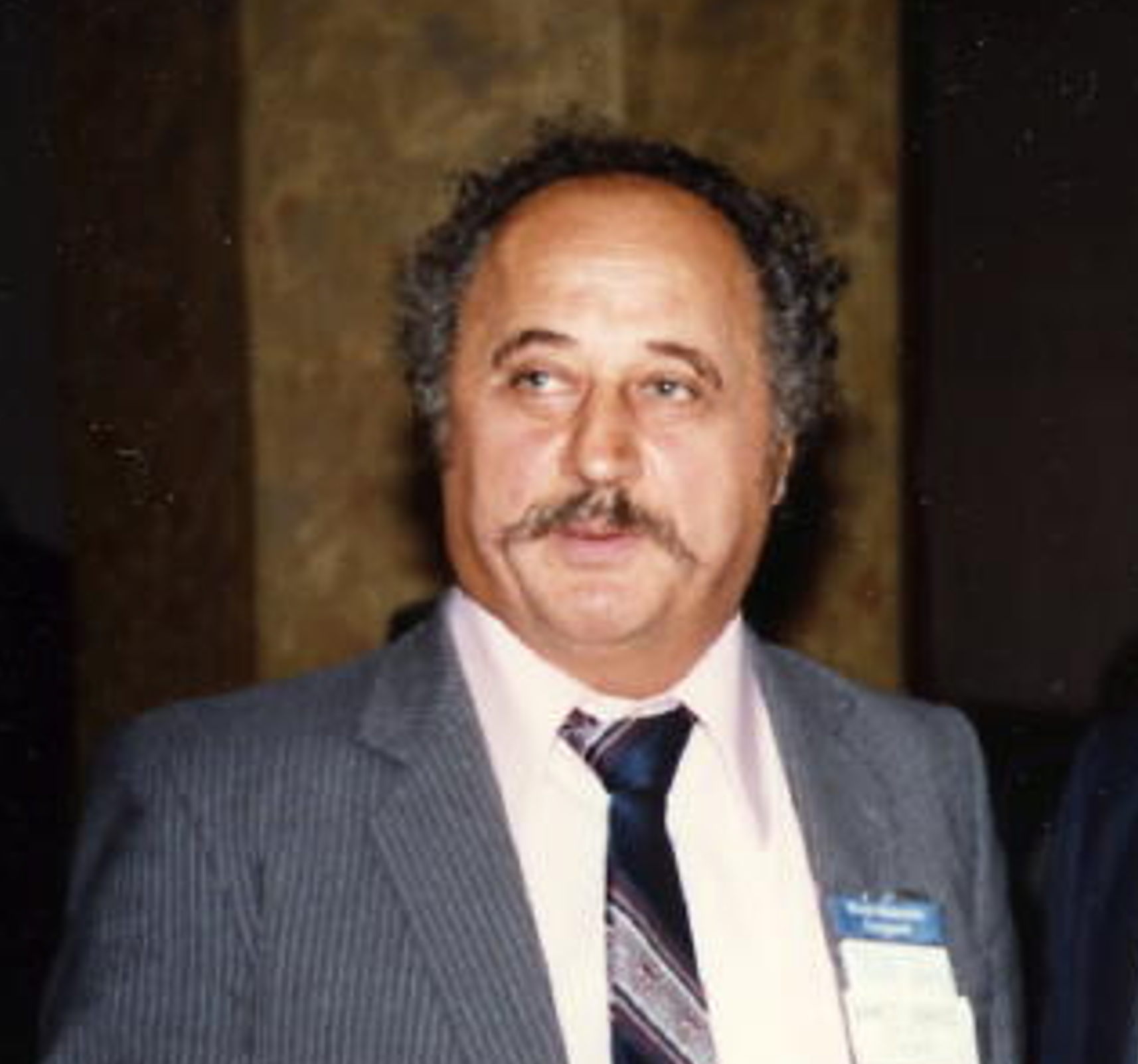
- Ernest Hondros in 1983 during VAMAS meeting at NPL
- Born: Anastasios Demetrios Hondros; February 18, 1930; Kastelorizo, Greece
- Died: September 13, 2016 (aged 86)
- Awards: A. A. Griffith Medal and Prize; MAE
- Scientific career
- Fields: Tribology
- Institutions: National Physical Laboratory; University of Melbourne

Ernest Demetrious Hondros CMG FRS (February 18, 1930 – September 13, 2016) was a British material scientist, and visiting professor at Imperial College London.

== Life ==
He was born in Kastelorizo in Greece. He grew up in Queensland. He earned a Doctor of Science (DSc) degree from the University of Melbourne. He was Director of the Petten Establishment, at the Joint Research Centre.

=== Honours and awards ===
- Elected a Fellow of The Royal Society (FRS)
- Appointed Companion of the Order of St Michael and St George (CMG)
- Doctor of Science Honoris Causa, Melbourne University and University of London
- Dr d’U (Paris) –Doctor of the Universite de Paris, France
- Member d'Honneur, Societe Francaise de Metallurgie
- Rosenhain Medal (Metals Society, U.K.)
- Howe Medal (American Society of Metals)
- A. A. Griffith Medal and Prize
