= VAMAS =

Collaborative project

- Versailles project on advanced materials and standards
- Abbreviation: VAMAS
- Formation: 1982; 44 years ago
- Founded at: Versailles, France
- Type: Nonprofit
- Methods: International Interlaboratory Comparison (ILC)
- Fields: Materials Science
- Members: 16
- Official language: English
- Chair: Nicholas Barbosa (US)
- Secretary: Steve Freiman (US)
- Affiliations: NMI-Australia, NPL-UK, BMTA-UK, NPL-India, NIST-US, NIMS-Japan, AIST-Japan, BAM-Germany, BIPM-France, INMETRO-Brazil, NRC-Canada, ITRI-Chinese Taipei, KRISS-Korea, and CINVESTAV-Mexico, CENAM-Mexico, NMISA-South Africa, UNIBS-Italy, ENEA-Italy, INRIM-Italy, NIM-China, APMP, BIPM, ISO, IEC
- Website: www.vamas.org
- Formerly called: Materials Research and Development Project

VAMAS (Versailles Project on Advanced Materials and Standards) is a collaborative project that was initiated at the 1982 G7 Economic Summit in Versailles to develop and promote standards for the characterisation of advanced materials, including surfaces, interfaces, thin films, and nanostructures. Using interlaboratory studies, the VAMAS project has developed a number of standard test methods and reference materials for a wide range of materials. These standards have been widely adopted by industry and academic researchers, and have contributed to the development of new materials and technologies.

== History ==
=== G7 summits proposals ===
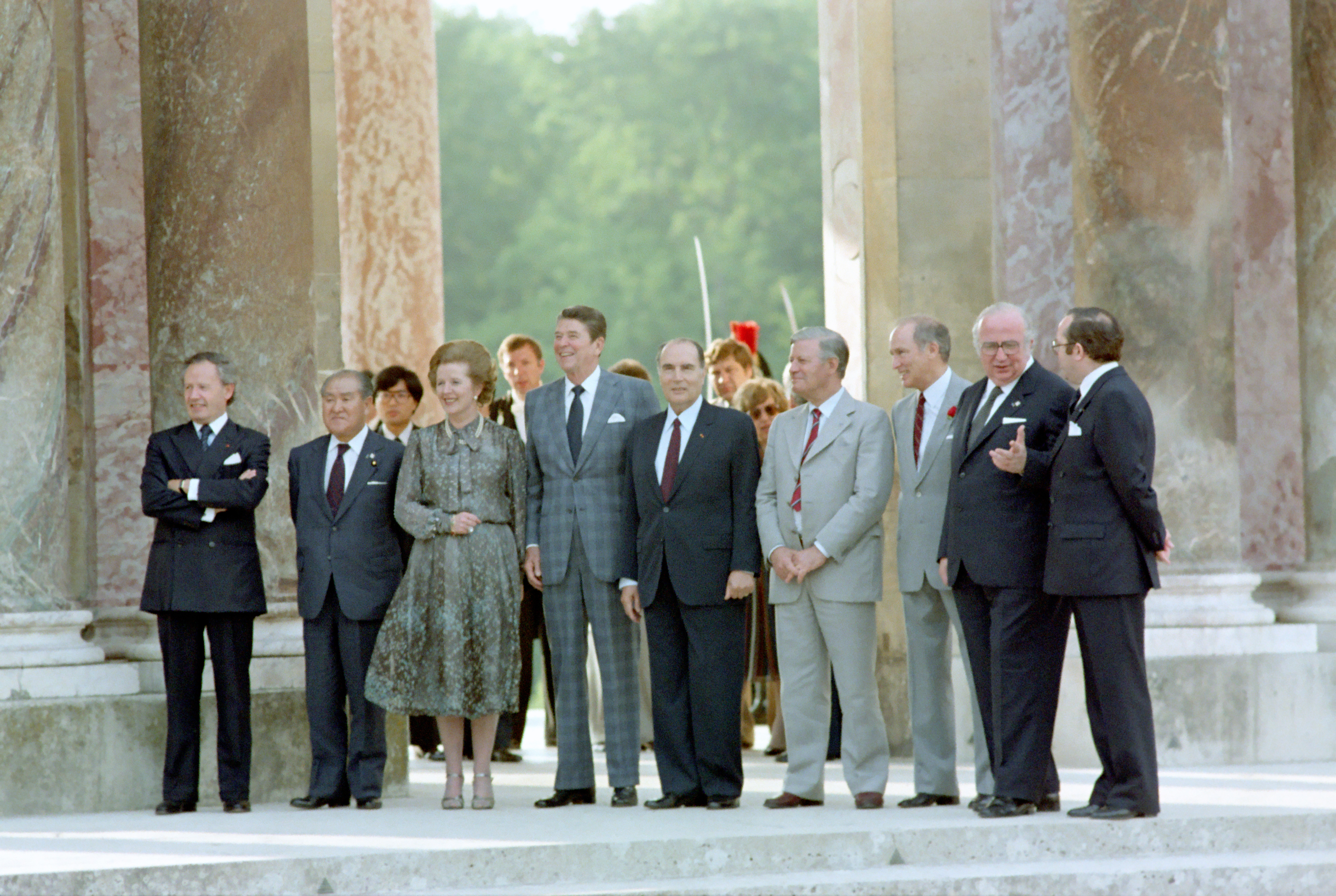
7th G7 Summit leaders at the Palace of Versailles

The Versailles project on advanced materials and standards (VAMAS) was first proposed, among 18 other projects, at the 1982 G7 Economic Summit held at the Palace of Versailles.

However the proposal materialised during the 1983 G7 summit in the US where there was a focus on issues related to science and technology. During that meeting, the attendees acknowledged the importance of collaborating in the field of science and technology. The proposals for cooperation came from the French President François Mitterrand, which were presented in a lengthy speech highlighting the necessity of creating a new international division of labour for technology.

The proposal was met with scepticism from the US, but George A. Keyworth, director of the White House's Office of Science and Technology Policy (OSTP), was enthusiastic about the idea of international cooperation in science and technology. He argued that the massive cost of experimental facilities in areas such as high-energy physics and fusion research made international collaboration desirable. Both Europe and the United States were spending approximately half a billion dollars a year on controlled fusion, with Japan spending another quarter of a billion dollars. Keyworth believed that this highly redundant research could be avoided with greater collaboration.

"The single most important outcome [of the initiative] is that science and technology have been discussed at two successive summits by the heads of state," says Robin Nicholson, chief scientific adviser to British Prime Minister Margaret Thatcher. "That has never happened before, and it must be significant for science and technology that it is happening now."

The French, under the guidance of President Mitterrand's personal adviser, Jacques Attali, who chaired the Versailles working group, provided a more pragmatic approach to the working groups to bridge the political gap between Mitterrand's interventionist position, broadly supported by Japan and Italy, and the United States' free-trade position, adopted by West Germany and the United Kingdom. The working group included a reference to the need to restrict the transfer of militarily technology to Soviet bloc.

During the summits, the Working Group on Science and Technology proposed 18 specific cooperation projects, with one or more of the seven nations and the European Economic Community taking organising responsibility for each project. The projects included high-energy physics, solar system exploration, remote sensing from space, advanced robotics, biological sciences, photosynthesis, the impact of new technologies on mature industries, high-speed ground transportation, public acceptance of new technologies, and aquiculture.

The United States declined to participate in projects in which it claimed government actions could impinge on the interests of the private sector, including the biotechnology project, which was led by France and generated the most controversy. Initially, France and Japan argued strongly for the internationalisation of biotechnology research. The UK requested to co-lead the biotechnology subject with France, but France's interest in the subject was criticised as "idiosyncratic" by the UK Chief Scientist.

The UK also nominated a Working Group to report on the theme of collaborative projects relating to "Technology, Growth and Employment," which developed the "Materials research and development" project that was jointly led by the UK and the US. This last project became the "Versailles Project on Advanced Materials and Standards", or VAMAS.

=== Inception ===
The VAMAS project was proposed by Robin Nicholson. Nicholson presented the proposal at IUVSTA meeting in Brighton, UK, in 1982, where it was well-received and subsequently led to the establishment of the VAMAS project. Nicholson and his colleagues recognised the need for international standards for the characterisation of surfaces and interfaces using X-ray photoelectron spectroscopy (XPS) and Auger electron spectroscopy (AES), and proposed the idea for a collaborative project to develop and promote such standards. The proposal was a result of a collaboration between the National Physical Laboratory and the UK Department of Trade and Industry, and it received significant support from the international scientific community.

Then, the proposal was put forward by Nicholson (Government Chief Scientist) to Prime Minister Thatcher to consider on 8 October 1982. In his letter, Nicholson outlined UK capabilities in excelling in Materials science research and development but "failed to reap the commercial rewards" VAMAS was meant to address the "entire materials cycle [which] is a fundamental component of economic production and technological innovation" (said President Regan), including the lack of agreed standards, test procedures, etc., which prevents the European Community from being taken as a single market for a new product involving the use of new materials.

On 15 October 1982, Thatcher agreed to the proposed approach, and during the early stages of the project, the Margaret Thatcher government provided significant financial and political support. Thatcher herself was reported to have taken a keen interest in its progress.

The United States expressed its intention to play an active role. The United Kingdom and the United States became the leading countries. Out of the original 18 projects, VAMAS is the only project that continues to this date.

=== Formation ===
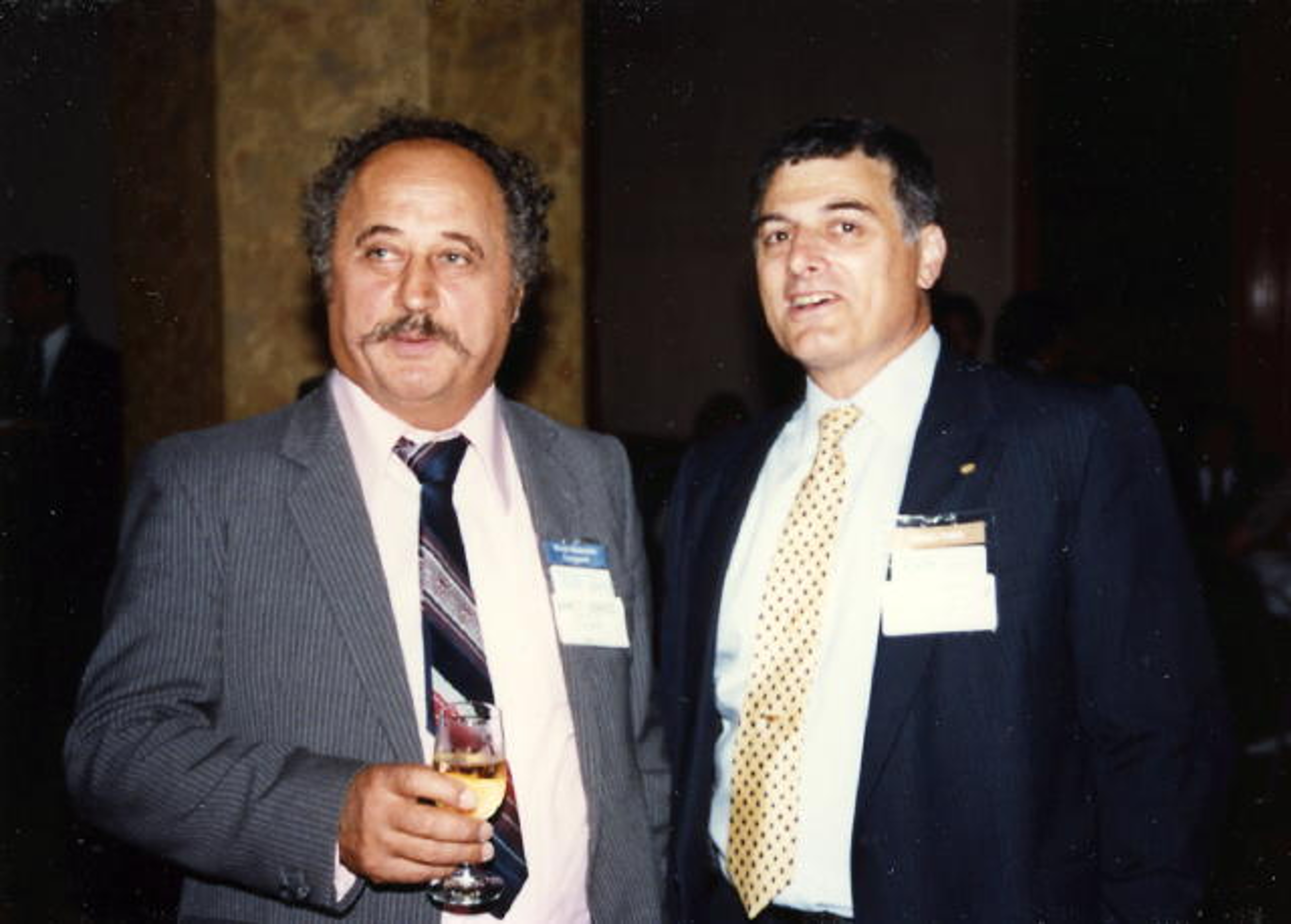
Ernest Hondros (left) at the 1983 first VAMAS meeting at NPL, Teddington

The first VAMAS meeting was held at the National Physical Laboratory (NPL) in Teddington, London, in 1983. There, Ernest Hondros was selected as the Chair for the Steering Committee.

VAMAS founding countries are (1982-1983): Canada, France, Germany, Italy, Japan, UK, USA, and European Economic Community. Brazil, Mexico, Chinese Taipei, South Africa, Australia, South Korea, and India joined later between 2007 and 2008, and China joined in 2013. VAMAS is supported by leadership in National measurement institutes (NMI) including NPL, National Institute for Materials Science (NIMS), National Bureau of Standards (today's National Institute of Standards and Technology, NIST), The British measurement and testing association (BMTA), International Bureau of Weights and Measures (BIPM), and Federal Institute for Materials Research and Testing (BAM).

VAMAS signed a memorandum with International Organization for Standardization (ISO) in 1993, International Electrotechnical Commission (IEC) in 1995, International Bureau of Weights and Measures (BIPM) and Asia Pacific Metrology Programme (APMP) in 2020.

First VAMAS technical groups included "Wear Test Methods" led by Horst Czichos (Germany), "Surface Chemical Analysis" led by Cedric J Powell (US), "Polymer Blends" led by Lechoslaw Utracki (Canada), and "Ceramics" led by Phillipe Boch (France).

The first round-robin test was held for Wear test methods and the results were reported in 1987.

== Objectives ==
Using new materials is crucial in advancing technology in fields such as electronics, energy, aerospace, and biotechnology. However, these materials have different qualities compared to traditional materials, which poses a challenge in standardisation and testing methods. In order to promote their use and distribution, it is important to consider the international division of labour and future product distribution. Developing international standards for new materials effectively removes technical barriers to trade and promotes global information circulation and data sharing. Unlike conventional materials, new materials must be standardised before the production of the object is standardised, or the use of the method has been socially accumulated. Thus, standardisation for new materials is considered pre-emptive rather than follow-up.

VAMAS initiative emerges from these needs as a collaborative endeavour involving national metrology institutes, universities, research institutions, and industry, with the primary goal of promoting international cooperation and accelerating technological advancement by facilitating the exchange of information and standardising measurement methods related to advanced materials. VAMAS support pre-standards research by providing the technical basis for measurements, testing, specifications, and standards. Using interlaboratory studies, this will lead to new improved test procedures, reference materials and data, or algorithms and software with the researchers being drawn from VAMAS and non-VAMAS countries. Results of these activities are submitted to ISO, Regional or National Standards bodies.

The project has generated a wealth of technical reports that offer detailed guidance on various aspects of materials characterisation, including sample preparation, measurement conditions, data analysis, and reporting. These reports are publicly accessible and widely utilised as a reference by researchers, instrument manufacturers, and testing laboratories. In addition to its efforts to establish materials characterisation standards, the VAMAS project has also contributed to the development of international standards for other areas of materials science, such as mechanical testing, thermal analysis, powder diffraction, X-ray photoelectron spectroscopy (XPS), Auger electron spectroscopy (AES), and secondary ion mass spectrometry (SIMS). Its endeavours have led to the emergence of new materials and technologies and fostered international collaboration in research and development.

More than 85 national, regional or international standards, 50 VAMAS reports, 5 ISO technology trends assessments (TTA), and 600 publications were resulted from VAMAS work.

== Structure ==
=== Steering Committee ===
VAMAS has a Steering Committee and a Technical Working Groups, with the latter responsible for conducting research cooperation activities in each technical field and managing research projects. The majority of joint research themes adopted by the Steering Committee focus on standardising testing and evaluation techniques. The Steering Committee, which includes representatives from Member States and the European Commission, has approves the launch of several sector working parties to promote the use of advanced materials in high-technology products and encourage international trade. This can be achieved through either national experts agreeing on compatible standards or through multilateral research to establish scientific and metrological bases for standardisation.

The Steering Committee has a Chair and secretariat both from the same host institute, and they are elected every 5 years. The secretariat publishes announcements of the Technical Working Group's activities. The Steering Committee meets annually.

==== Previous chairs ====
The VAMAS Chair and Secretariat rotate on a three-year cycle.

- 1983–1986: Ernest D. Hondros (NPL, UK) – Inaugural Chair
- 1986–1989: Lyle H. Schwartz (NBS, USA)
- 1989–1992: M. Kamal Hossain (NPL, UK)
- 1992–1995: Harry L. Rook (NIST, USA)
- 1995–1998: M. Kamal Hossain (NPL, UK)
- 1998–2002: Stephen W. Freiman (NIST, USA)
- 2005–2008: Stephen M. Hsu (NIST, USA)
- 2017: Pedro D. Portella (BAM, Germany)
- 2018–2020: Michael J. Fasolka (NIST, USA)
- 2020–2023: Fernando A. de Castro (NPL, UK)
- 2023–Present: Nicholas Barbosa (NIST, USA)

=== Technical work areas ===
VAMAS technical work areas (TWA) are list for active and completed.

1 Wear Test Methods	2 Surface Chemical Analysis	3 Ceramics for Structural Applications
4 Multiphase Polymers	5 Polymer Composites	6 Superconducting and Cryogenic Structural Materials
7 Biomaterials	8 Hot Salt Corrosion Resistance	9 Weld Characteristics
10 Computerised Materials Data	11 Creep Crack Growth	12 Efficient Test Procedures for Polymers
13 Low Cycle Fatigue	14 Unified Classification System for Advanced Ceramics	15 Metal Matrix Composites
16 Superconducting Materials	17 Cryogenic Structural Materials	18 Statistical Techniques for Interlaboratory Studies
19 High-Temperature Fracture of Brittle Materials	20 Residual Stress	21 Mechanical Measurements for Hardmetals
22 Mechanical Properties of Thin Films and Coatings	23 Thermal Properties of Thin Films	24 Performance Related Properties of Electroceramics
25 Creep, Fatigue Crack Growth in Components	26 Full Field Optical Stress and Strain Measurement	27 Characterisation Methods for Ceramic Powders and Green Bodies
28 Quantitative Mass Spectrometry of Synthetic Polymers	29 Nanomechanics applied to Scanning Probe Microscopy	30 Tissue Engineering
31 Creep, Crack and Fatigue Growth in Weldments	32 Modulus Measurements	33 Polymer Nanocomposites
34 Nanoparticle Populations	35 Materials Databases Interoperability	36 Printed, flexible and stretchable electronics
37 Quantitative Microstructural Analysis	38 Thermoelectric Materials	39 Solid Sorbents
40 Synthetic Biomaterials	41 Graphene and Related 2D Materials	42 Raman Spectroscopy and Microscopy
43 Thermal Properties	44 Self-Healing Ceramics	45 Micro and Nano Plastics in the Environment

=== International Interlaboratory Comparison ===
International Interlaboratory Comparison is a method of ensuring the accuracy and reliability of testing results by comparing the measurements made by different laboratories worldwide. In this method, a sample is sent to multiple laboratories in round-robin tests, and each laboratory measures the same sample using their respective methods and equipment. The results are then compared to identify any differences or discrepancies, and to evaluate the consistency and reliability of the methods used by each laboratory. This process helps to ensure that the testing and measurement methods used by laboratories are accurate, and that the results obtained can be trusted and used confidently.
