= Fernando Castro (scientist) =

Scientist specialising in materials and semiconductor metrology

Fernando Araujo de Castro FIMMM FInstP
- Known for: Materials and semiconductor metrology
- Awards: Rayleigh Award (2012, 2020)
- Scientific career
- Fields: Metrology, Materials science, Semiconductor
- Workplaces: National Physical Laboratory; University of Surrey

Fernando Araujo de Castro is a scientist specialising in materials science, semiconductor technology and metrology. He is an NPL Fellow and Head of Science for Advanced Materials and Semiconductors at the UK's National Physical Laboratory (NPL). He is also a visiting professor at the University of Surrey.

Castro served as chair of the European Metrology Network for Advanced Manufacturing and as global chair of the Versailles Project on Advanced Materials and Standards (VAMAS) from 2020 to 2023. He has represented the United Kingdom on the VAMAS Steering Committee since 2018.

Castro received NPL's Rayleigh Award in 2012 and 2020 for scientific publications. He was elected a Fellow of the Institute of Physics in 2015 and a Fellow of the Institute of Materials, Minerals and Mining in 2017. He subsequently became an NPL Fellow in 2026.
