= 8th G7 summit =

1982 international leader meeting in France

Coordinates: 48.8048°N 2.1204°E

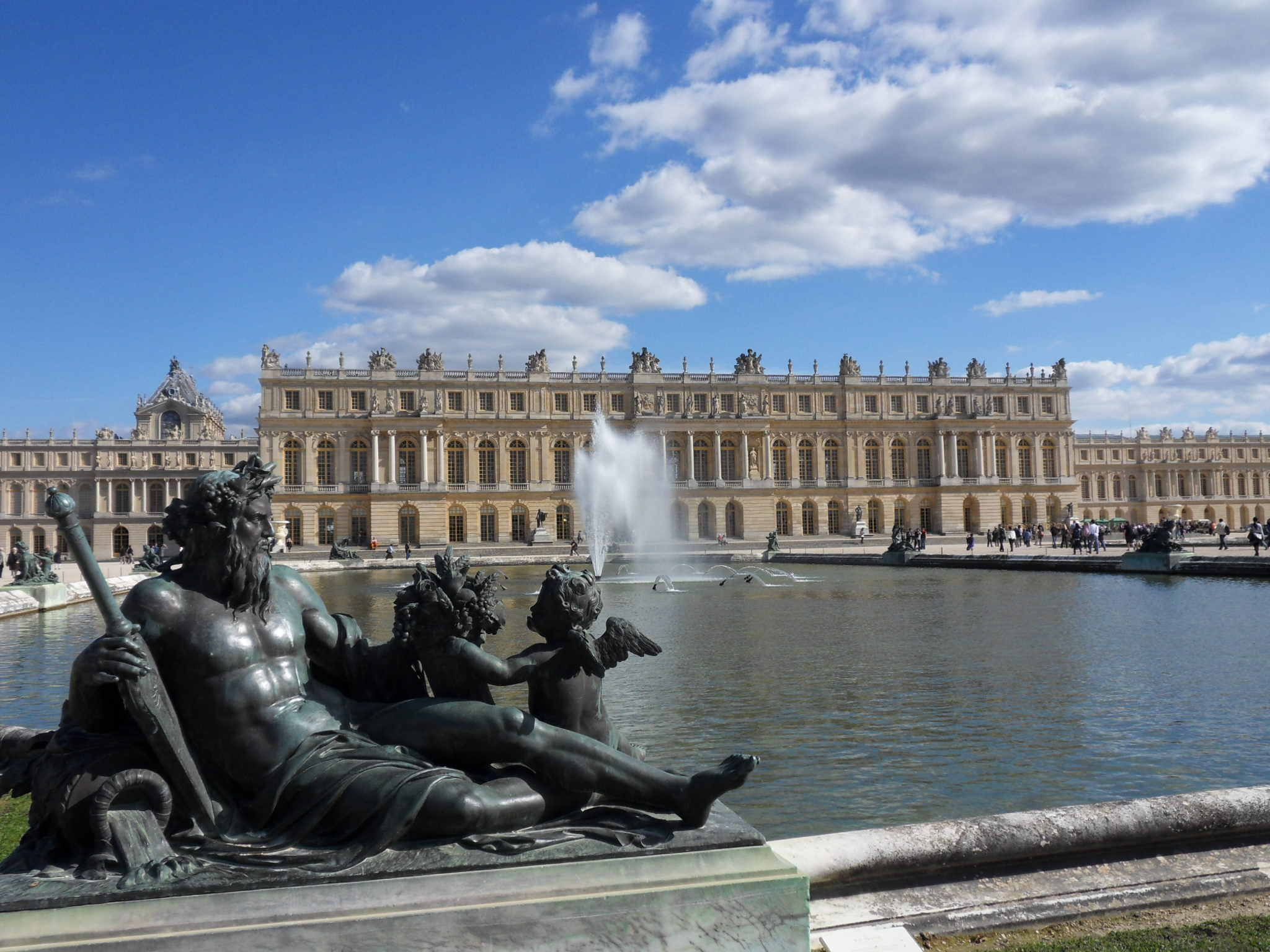
- The Palace of Versailles, the venue of the 8th G7 summit
- Host country: France
- Dates: 4–6 June 1982
- Cities: Versailles
- Venues: Palace of Versailles
- Follows: 7th G7 summit
- Precedes: 9th G7 summit

The 8th G7 Summit was held at the Palace of Versailles, France, from 4 to 6 June 1982.

The Group of Seven (G7) was an unofficial forum which brought together the heads of the richest industrialized countries: France, West Germany, Italy, Japan, the United Kingdom, the United States, Canada (since 1976), and the President of the European Commission (starting officially in 1981). The summits were not meant to be linked formally with wider international institutions; and in fact, a mild rebellion against the stiff formality of other international meetings was a part of the genesis of cooperation between France's president Valéry Giscard d'Estaing and West Germany's chancellor Helmut Schmidt as they conceived the first Group of Six (G6) summit in 1975.

== Leaders at the summit ==
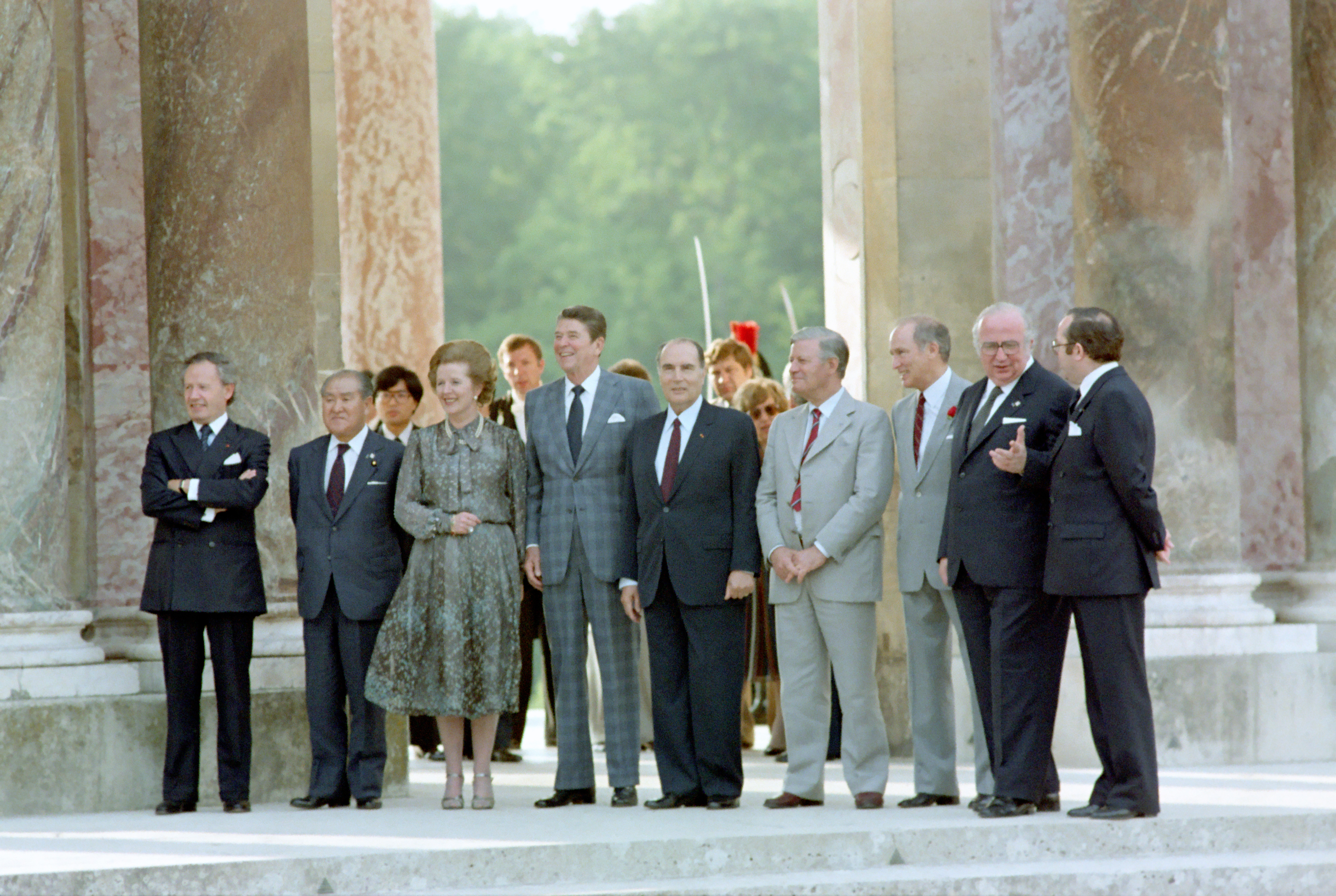
Summit leaders at the Palace of Versailles (left to right): Gaston Thorn, Zenko Suzuki, Margaret Thatcher, Ronald Reagan, François Mitterrand, Helmut Schmidt, Pierre Trudeau, Giovanni Spadolini, and Wilfried Martens

The G7 is an unofficial annual forum for the leaders of Canada, the European Commission, France, Germany, Italy, Japan, the United Kingdom and the United States.

The 8th G7 summit was the last summit for German Chancellor Helmut Schmidt, Italian Prime Minister Giovanni Spadolini and Japanese Prime Minister Zenko Suzuki.

=== Participants ===
These summit participants are the current "core members" of the international forum:

**Core G7 members** Host state and leader are shown in bold text.
Member		Represented by	Title
(Canada)	Canada	Pierre Trudeau	Prime Minister
(France)	**France**	**François Mitterrand**	**President**
(West Germany)	West Germany	Helmut Schmidt	Chancellor
(Italy)	Italy	Giovanni Spadolini	Prime Minister
(Japan)	Japan	Zenkō Suzuki	Prime Minister
(United Kingdom)	United Kingdom	Margaret Thatcher	Prime Minister
(United States)	United States	Ronald Reagan	President
(European Union)	European Community	Gaston Thorn	President of the Commission
(European Union)	European Community	(Belgium) Wilfried Martens	President of the Council

== Issues ==
The summit was intended as a venue for resolving differences among its members. As a practical matter, the summit was also conceived as an opportunity for its members to give each other mutual encouragement in the face of difficult economic decisions.

== Gallery of participating leaders ==
=== Core G7 participants ===
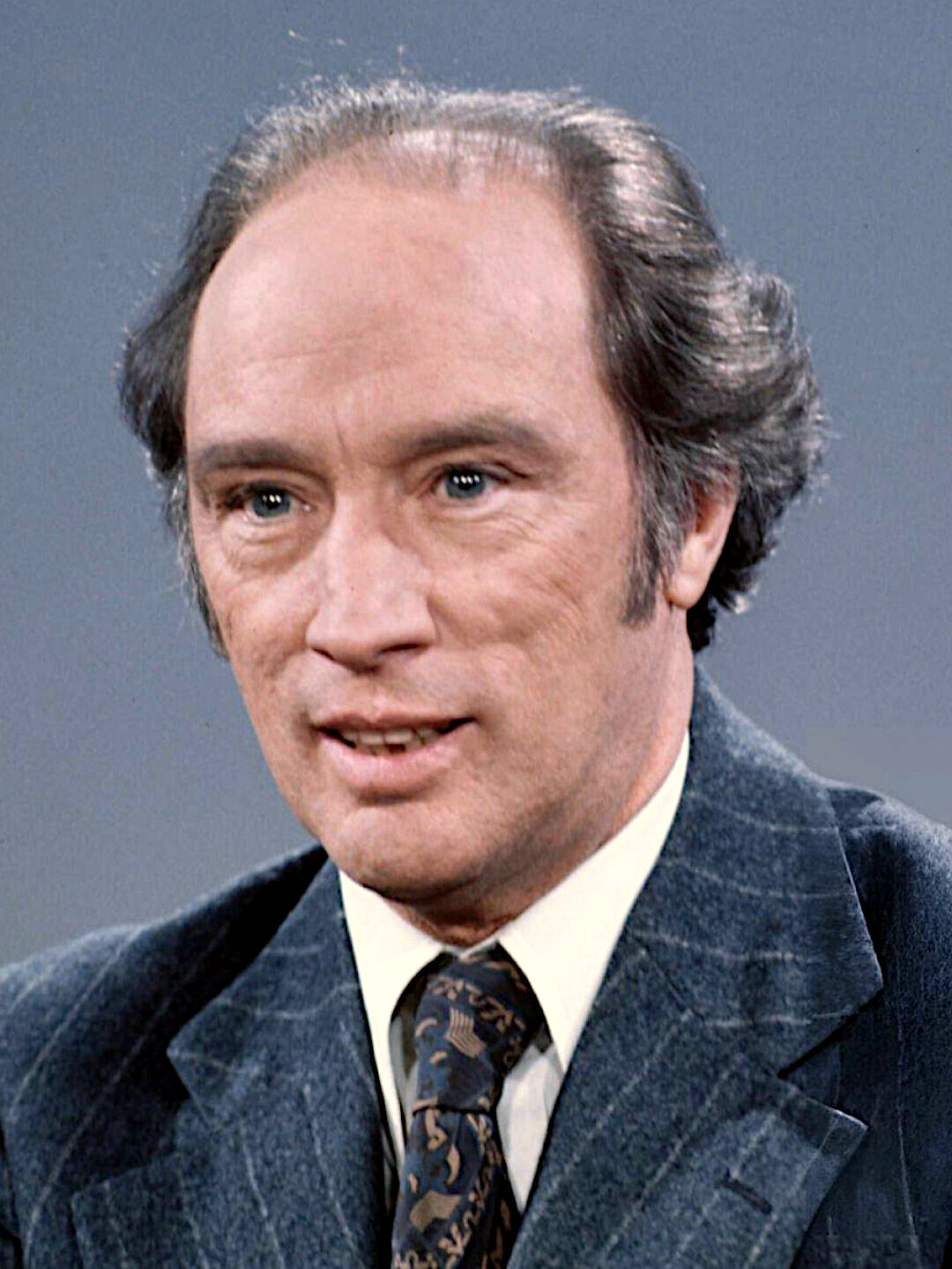
(Canada) Canada
Pierre Trudeau,
Prime Minister

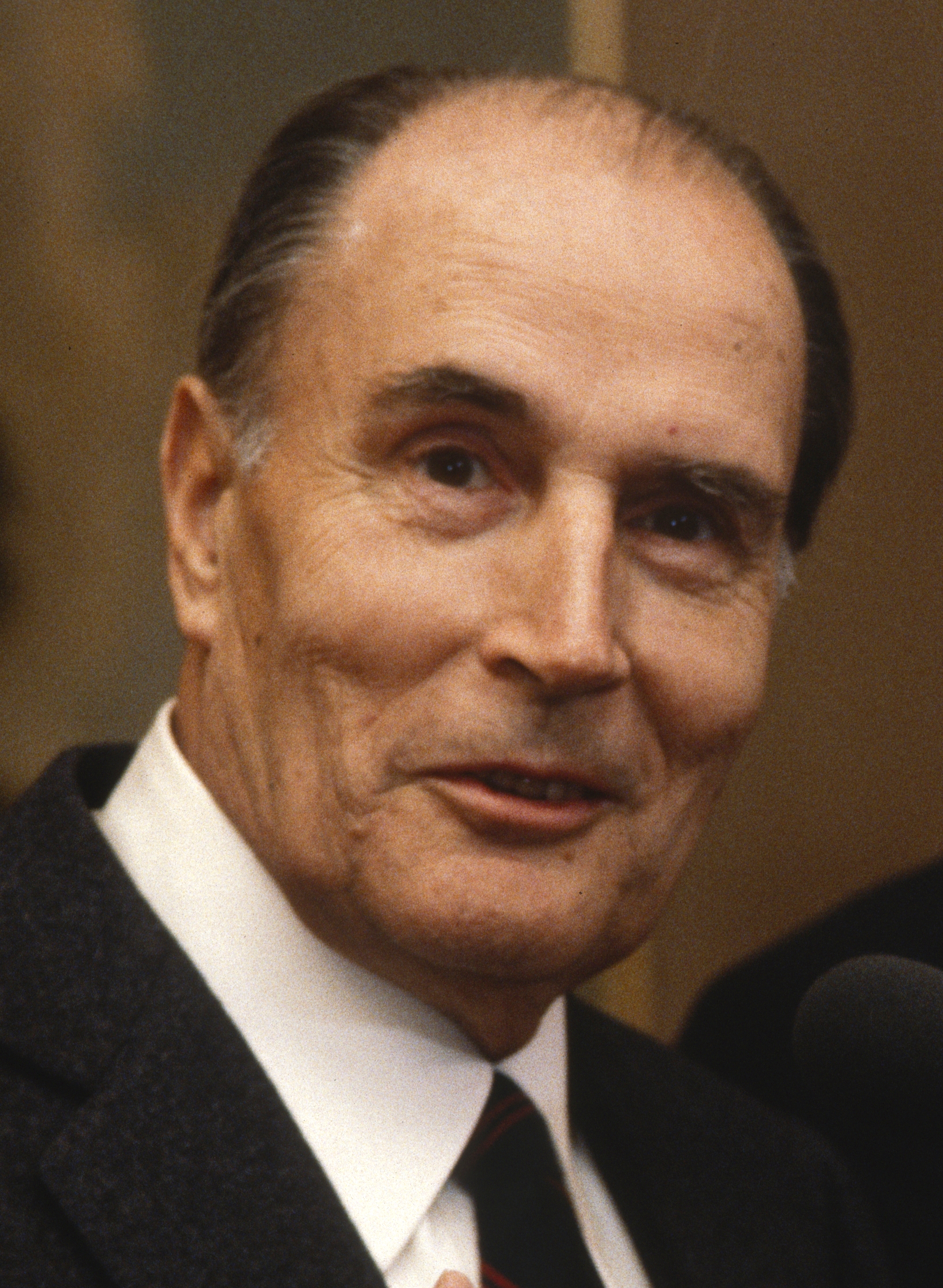
(France) France
François Mitterrand,
President (Host)

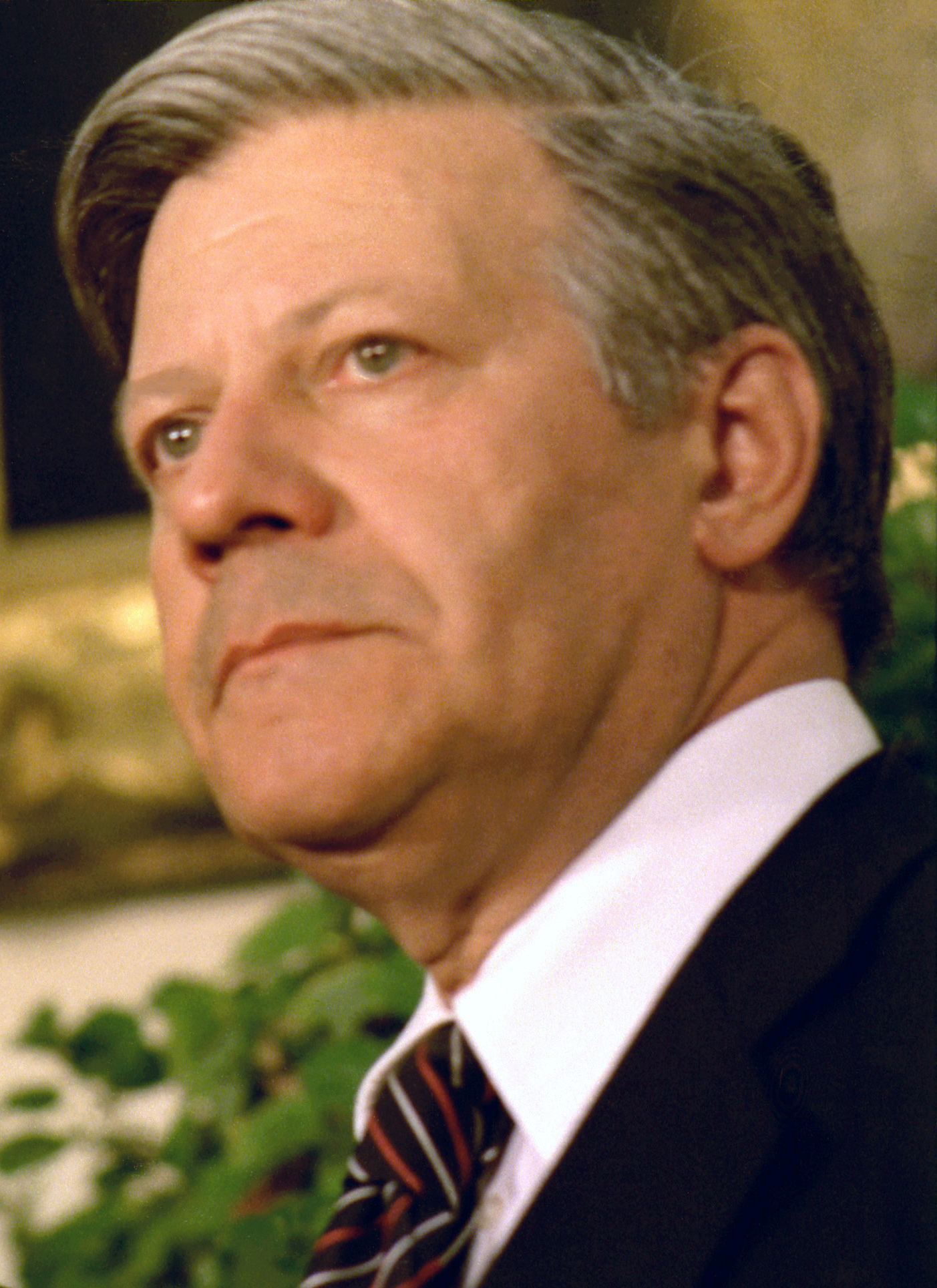
(Germany) Germany
Helmut Schmidt,
Chancellor

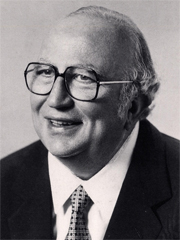
(Italy) Italy
Giovanni Spadolini,
Prime Minister

(Japan) Japan
Zenkō Suzuki,
Prime Minister

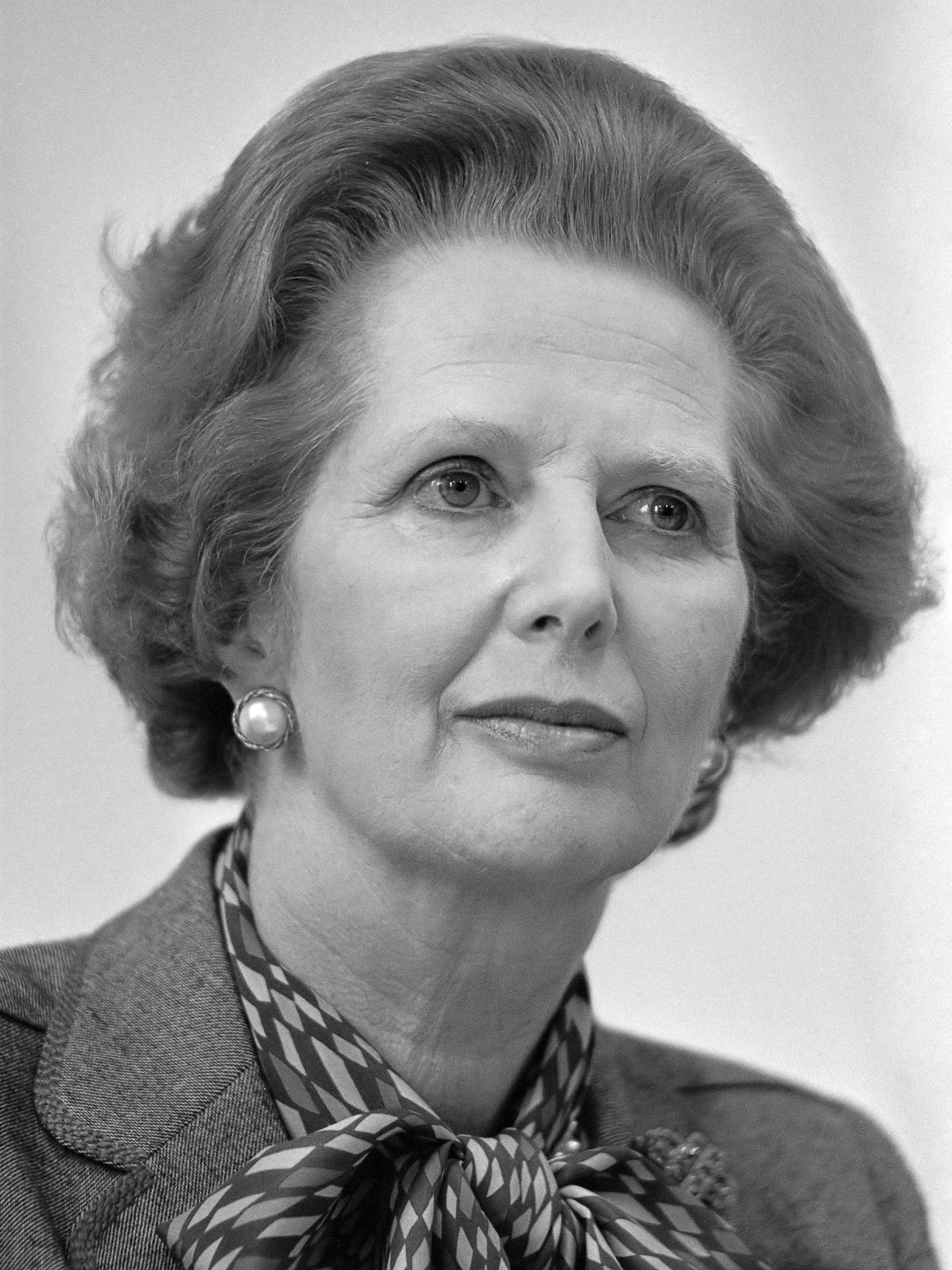
(United Kingdom) United Kingdom
Margaret Thatcher,
Prime Minister

(United States) United States
Ronald Reagan,
President
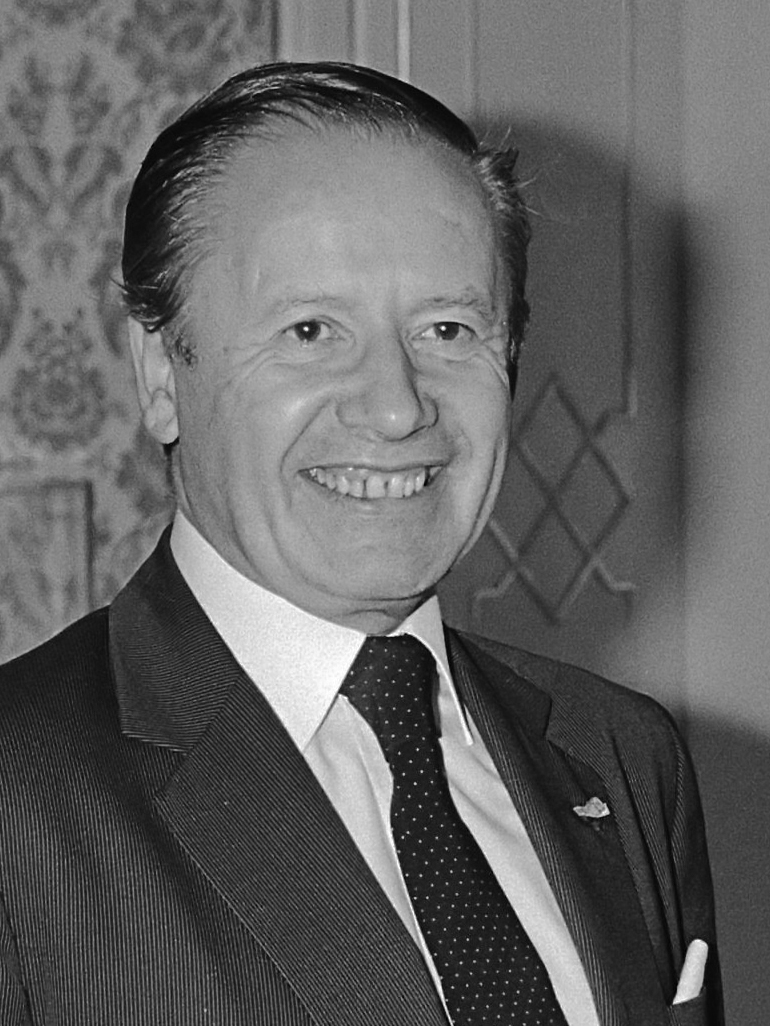
(European Union) European Community
Gaston Thorn,
President of the Commission

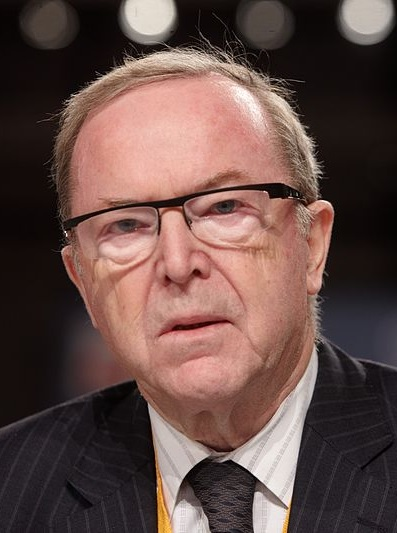
(European Union) European Community
Wilfried Martens (Prime Minister of Belgium), rotating President of the Council

== See also ==
- Group of Seven
- VAMAS
