= 9th G7 summit =

1983 international leader meeting in the US

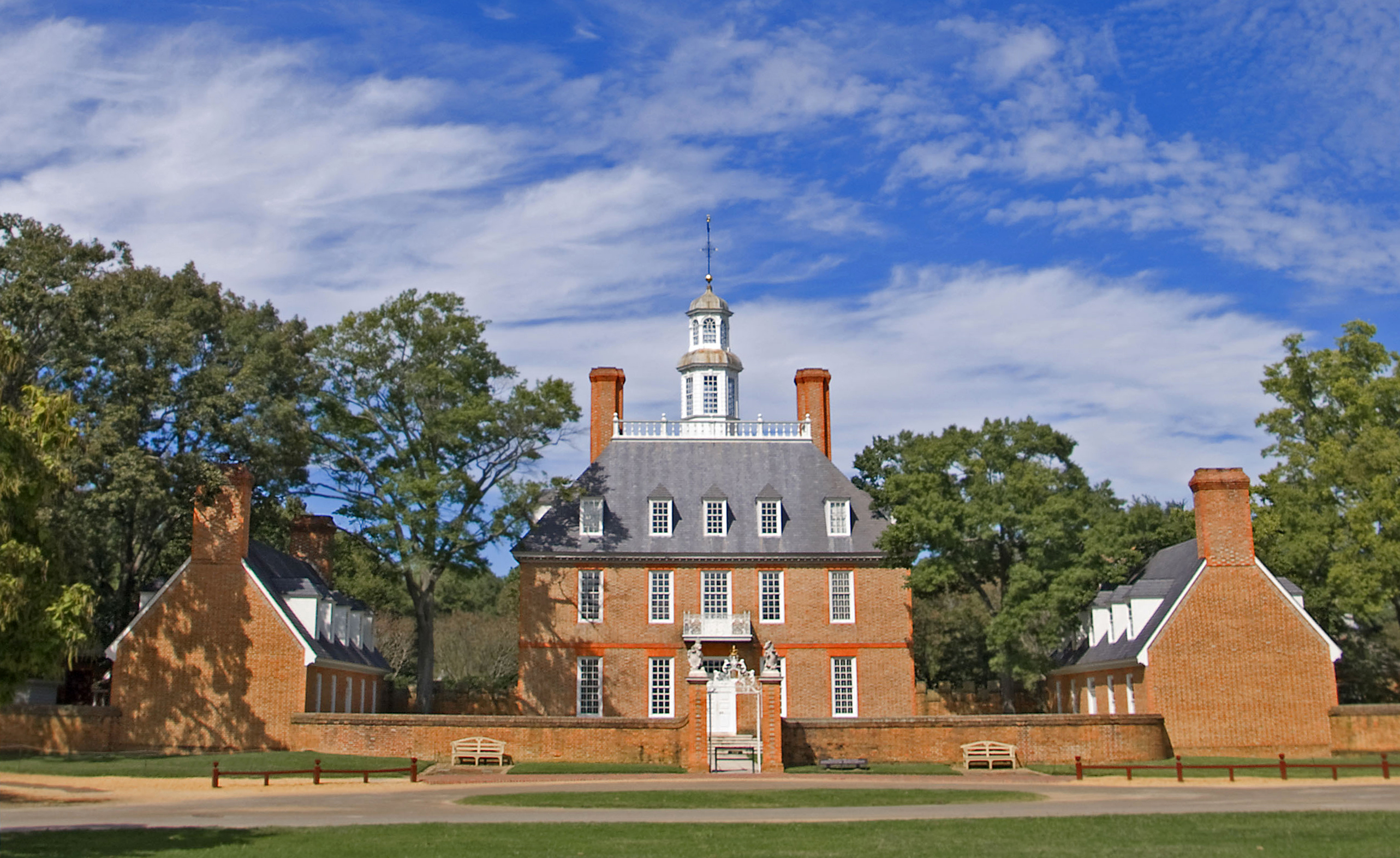
- Governor's Palace in Williamsburg
- Host country: United States
- Dates: May 28–29, 1983
- Cities: Williamsburg, Virginia
- Venues: Colonial Capitol
- Follows: 8th G7 summit
- Precedes: 10th G7 summit

The 9th G7 Summit was held at Williamsburg, Virginia, United States between May 28 and 30, 1983. The venue for the summit meetings was Colonial Williamsburg in Virginia.

The Group of Seven (G7) was an unofficial forum which brought together the heads of the richest industrialized countries: France, West Germany, Italy, Japan, the United Kingdom, the United States, Canada (since 1976), and the President of the European Commission (starting officially in 1981). The summits were not meant to be linked formally with wider international institutions; and in fact, a mild rebellion against the stiff formality of other international meetings was a part of the genesis of cooperation between France's president Valéry Giscard d'Estaing and West Germany's chancellor Helmut Schmidt as they conceived the first Group of Six (G6) summit in 1975.

== Leaders at the summit ==
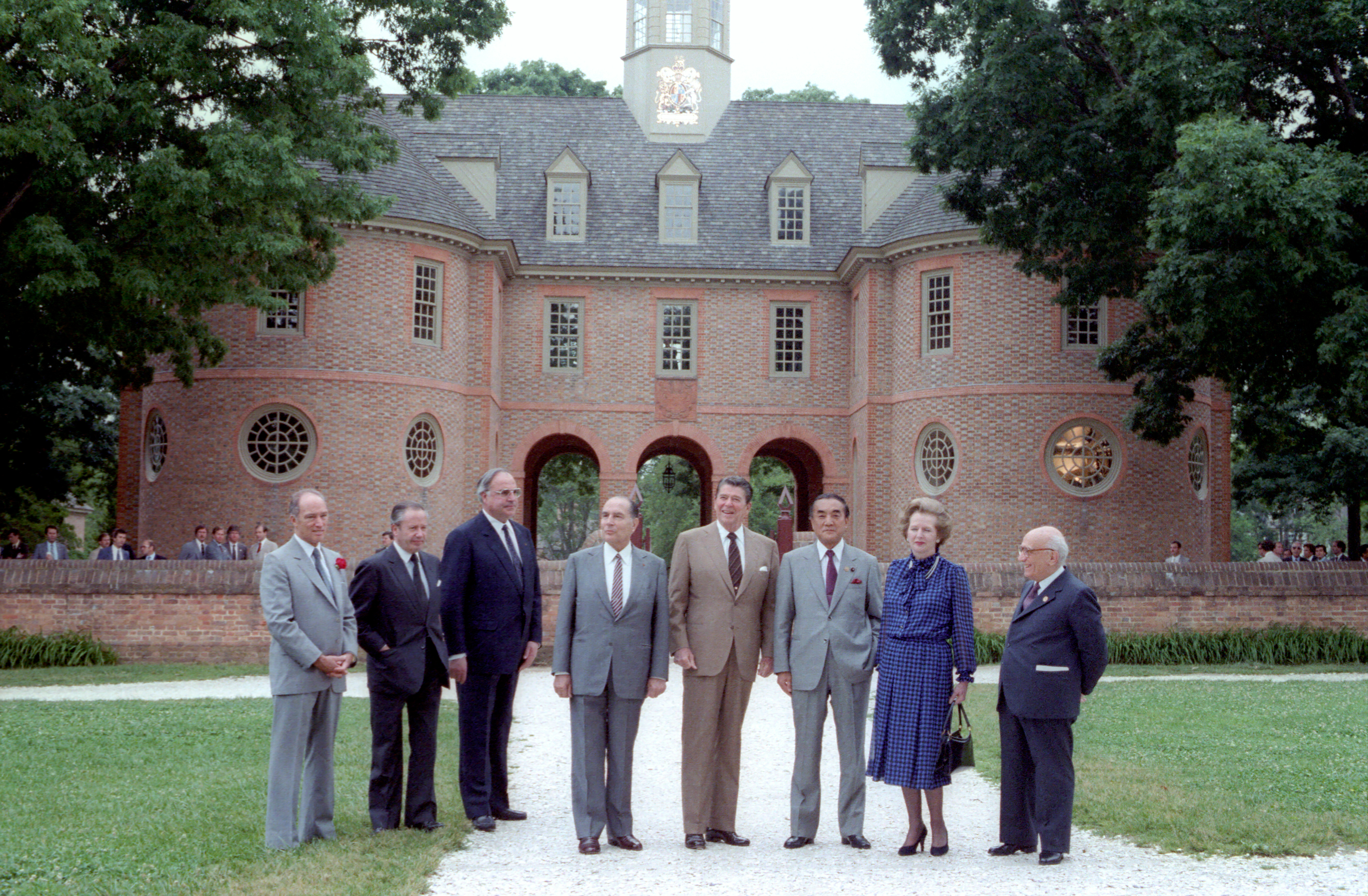
Summit leaders in front of the colonial Capitol building. (Left to right): Pierre Trudeau, Gaston Thorn, Helmut Kohl, François Mitterrand, Ronald Reagan, Yasuhiro Nakasone, Margaret Thatcher, and Amintore Fanfani

The G7 is an unofficial annual forum for the leaders of Canada, the European Commission, France, Germany, Italy, Japan, the United Kingdom, and the United States. This was the first summit where none of the original participants from 1975 were still in office.

The 9th G7 summit was the first summit for German Chancellor Helmut Kohl, Italian Prime Minister Amintore Fanfani, and Japanese Prime Minister Yasuhiro Nakasone.

=== Participants ===
These summit participants are the current "core members" of the international forum:

**Core G7 members** Host state and leader are shown in bold text.
Member		Represented by	Title
(Canada)	Canada	Pierre Trudeau	Prime Minister
(France)	France	François Mitterrand	President
(West Germany)	West Germany	Helmut Kohl	Chancellor
(Italy)	Italy	Amintore Fanfani	Prime Minister
(Japan)	Japan	Yasuhiro Nakasone	Prime Minister
(United Kingdom)	United Kingdom	Margaret Thatcher	Prime Minister
(United States)	**United States**	**Ronald Reagan**	**President**
(European Union)	European Community	Gaston Thorn	Commission President
(European Union)	European Community	Helmut Kohl	Council President

== Issues ==
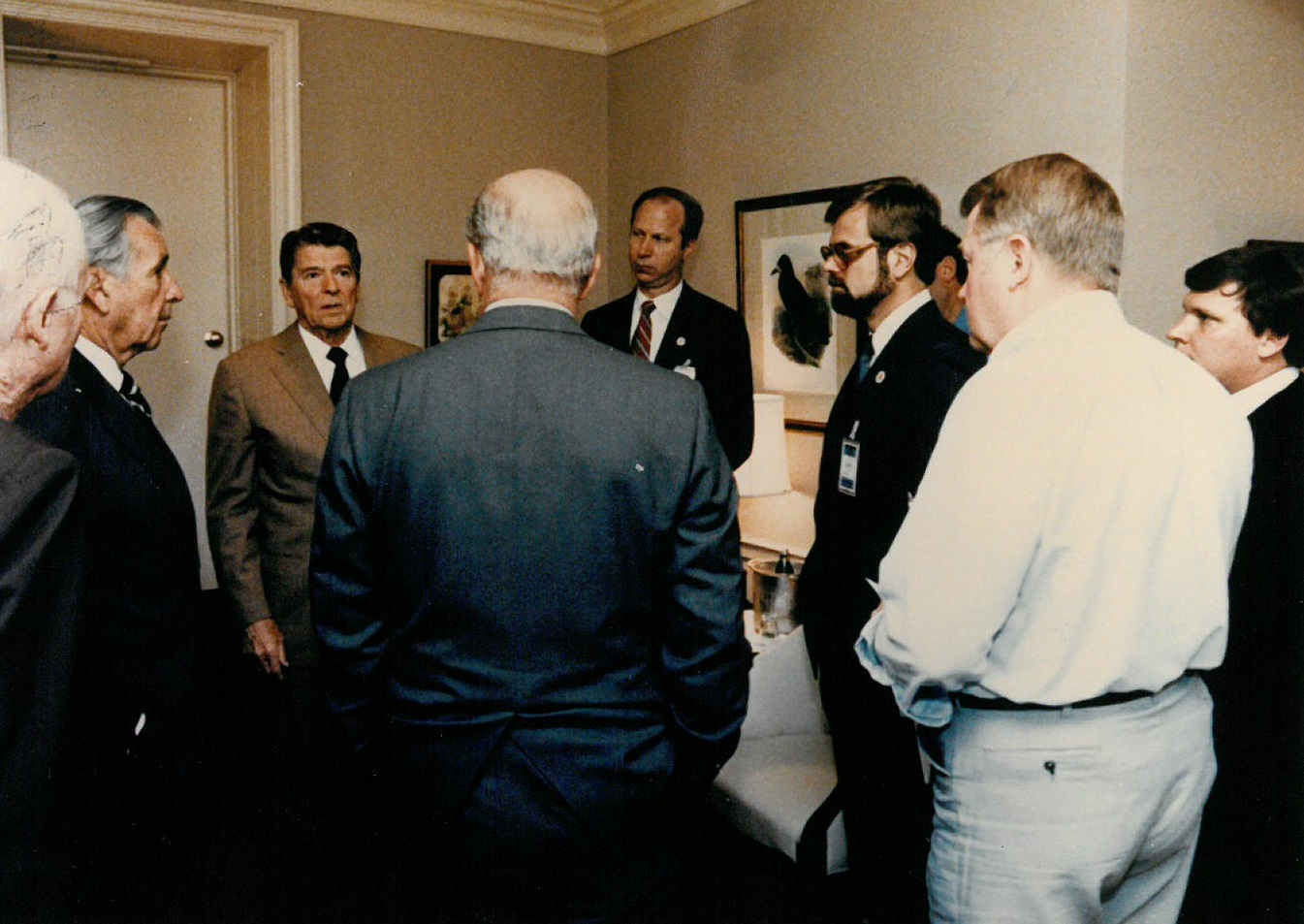
US President Ronald Reagan and his advisers at Williamsburg

The summit was intended as a venue for resolving differences among its members. As a practical matter, the summit was also conceived as an opportunity for its members to give each other mutual encouragement in the face of difficult economic decisions.

Meetings of the G7 focus on issues related to the economy and multinational efforts to connect these issues. However, talks led by President Reagan at this G7 Summit also concentrated on tensions with the Soviet Union and the need for missile deployment in Europe to encourage the Soviet Union to return to arms control talks in Geneva. A bilateral discussion was held between Reagan and Prime Minister Margaret Thatcher prior to the G-7 meeting. Thatcher stressed the need to reaffirm the NATO double-track decision of 1979 approach to talks with the Soviets. Thatcher and Reagan agreed that it would be helpful to have G-7 reaffirm the decision. However, President François Mitterrand and Prime Minister Pierre Trudeau were hesitant to agree. The first meeting of the leaders was head of state only. At the coffee hour Reagan appeared concerned that it would not be possible to get full agreement. Following the coffee break the first meeting of the Summit, Reagan forged an agreement with the strong support of Prime Minister Yasuhiro Nakasone of Japan, Chancellor Helmut Kohl of West Germany and Thatcher. The need to deploy the Pershing II missiles was reached and reaffirmed. This decision showed the unity of Western leaders as they forged ahead to seek meaningful arms control agreements with the Soviet Union and it was a critical step in the arms control agreements reached between Soviet General Secretary Mikhail Gorbachev and Reagan two years later at the Geneva Summit, the first meeting between these two leaders.

In addition to the reinforcement of the double-track decision on arms control, the leaders were confronted with a stubborn world economy, double digit inflation, high interest rates and high unemployment. These economic conditions were stimulated, in part, due to higher oil prices in the early 1980s caused by the Iranian Revolution. The G-7 summit a year earlier had been held in Versailles, hosted by Mitterrand. Reagan felt that it was important to stress the importance of free markets and free trade and transparency in international dealings. After two days of debate, the leaders agreed to the Williamsburg Declaration, which stands as quite unique in terms of G-7 communiques as it was a short ten point declaration and it was read in its entirety by Reagan seated before the other leaders The significance of the Declaration cannot be over-emphasized as it was the free market principles agreed to by the leaders at the summit that provided an international environment of free trade and investment that propelled the world economies out of economic recession toward durable economic growth of twenty years. The declaration was prepared by a small team of NSC advisers close to Reagan.

The Williamsburg Economic Summit was the only international meeting chaired by Reagan.

== Gallery of participating leaders ==
=== Core G7 participants ===
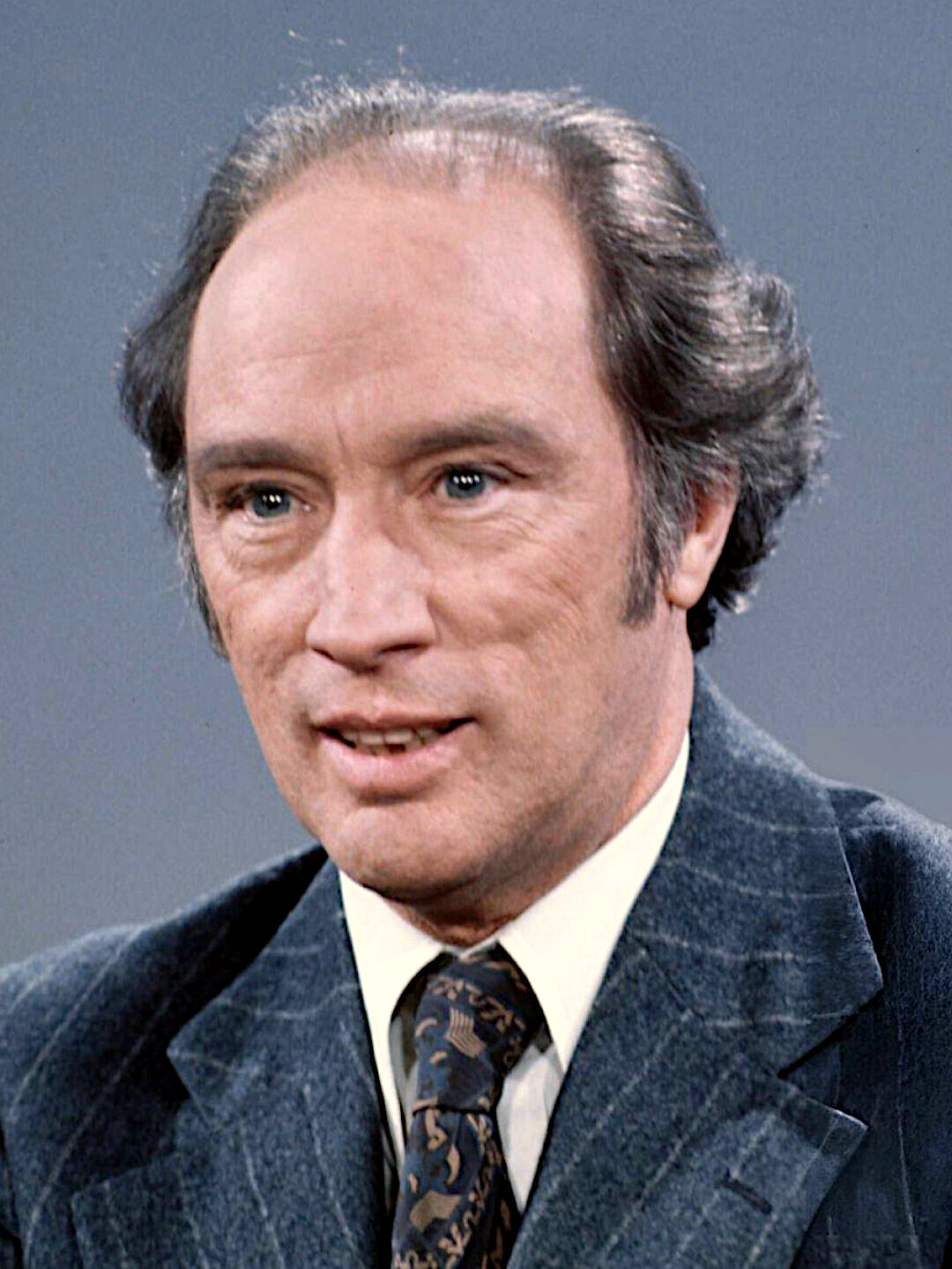
(Canada) Canada
Pierre Trudeau,
Prime Minister

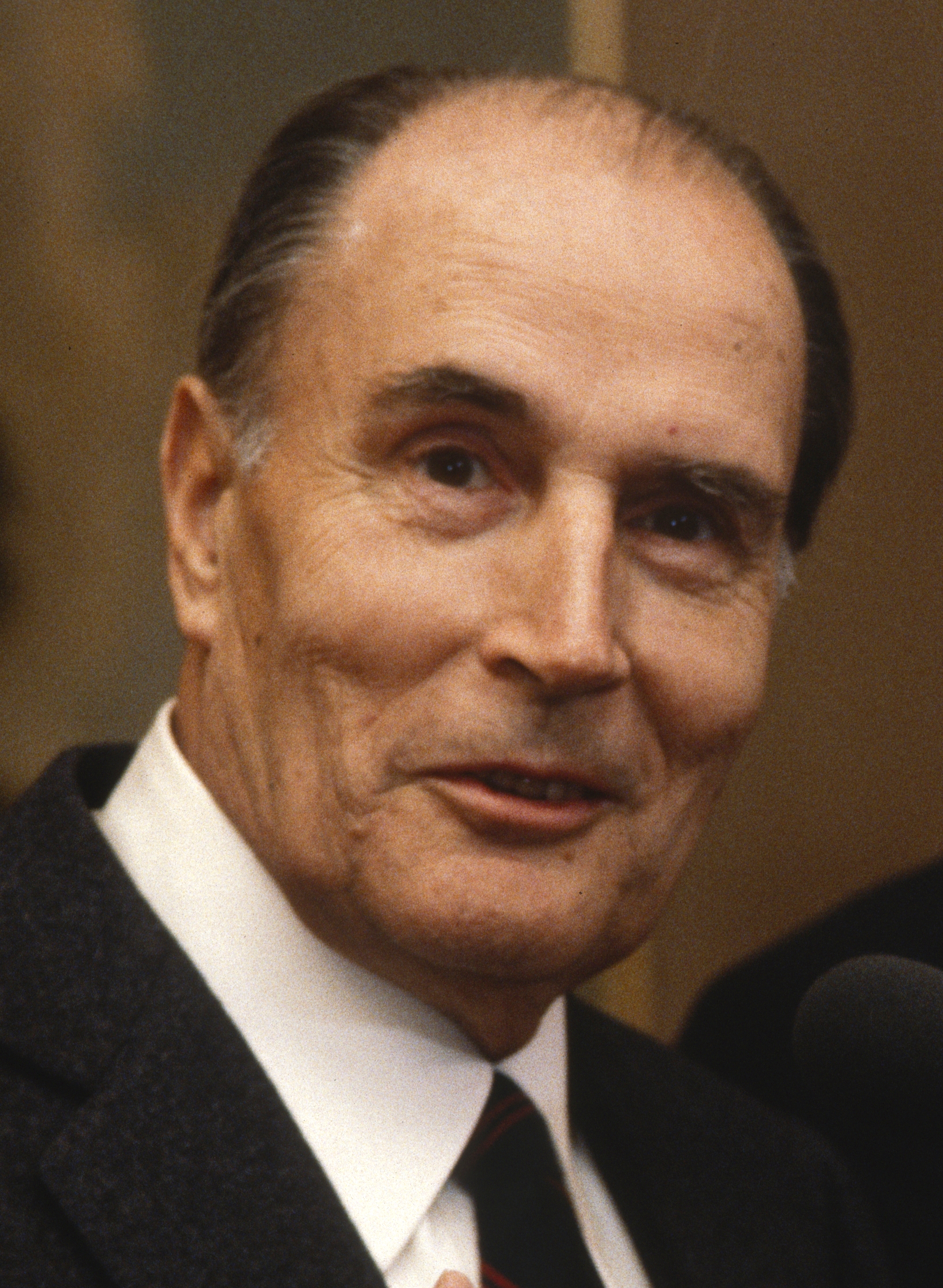
(France) France
François Mitterrand,
President

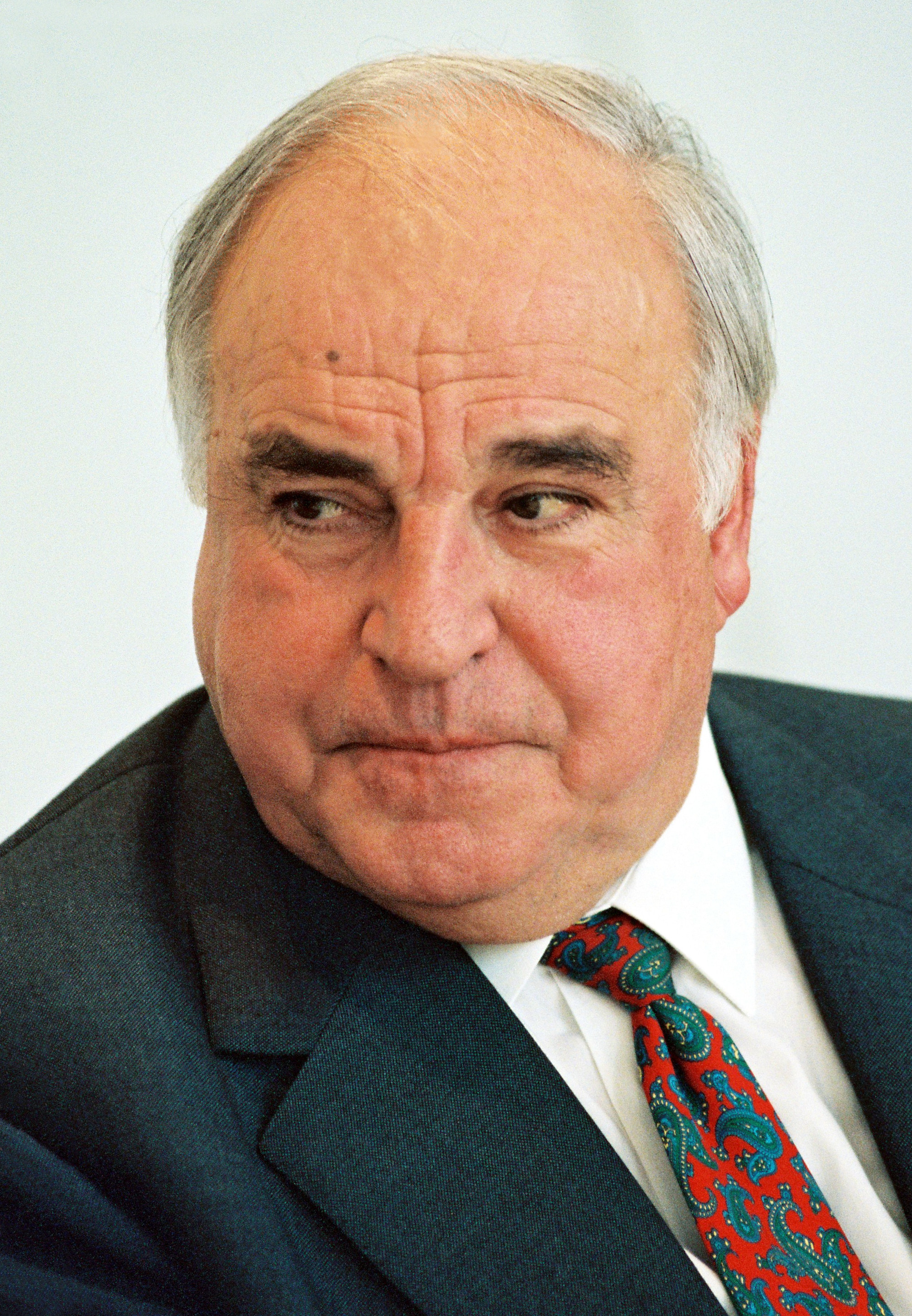
(Germany) Germany
Helmut Kohl,
Chancellor

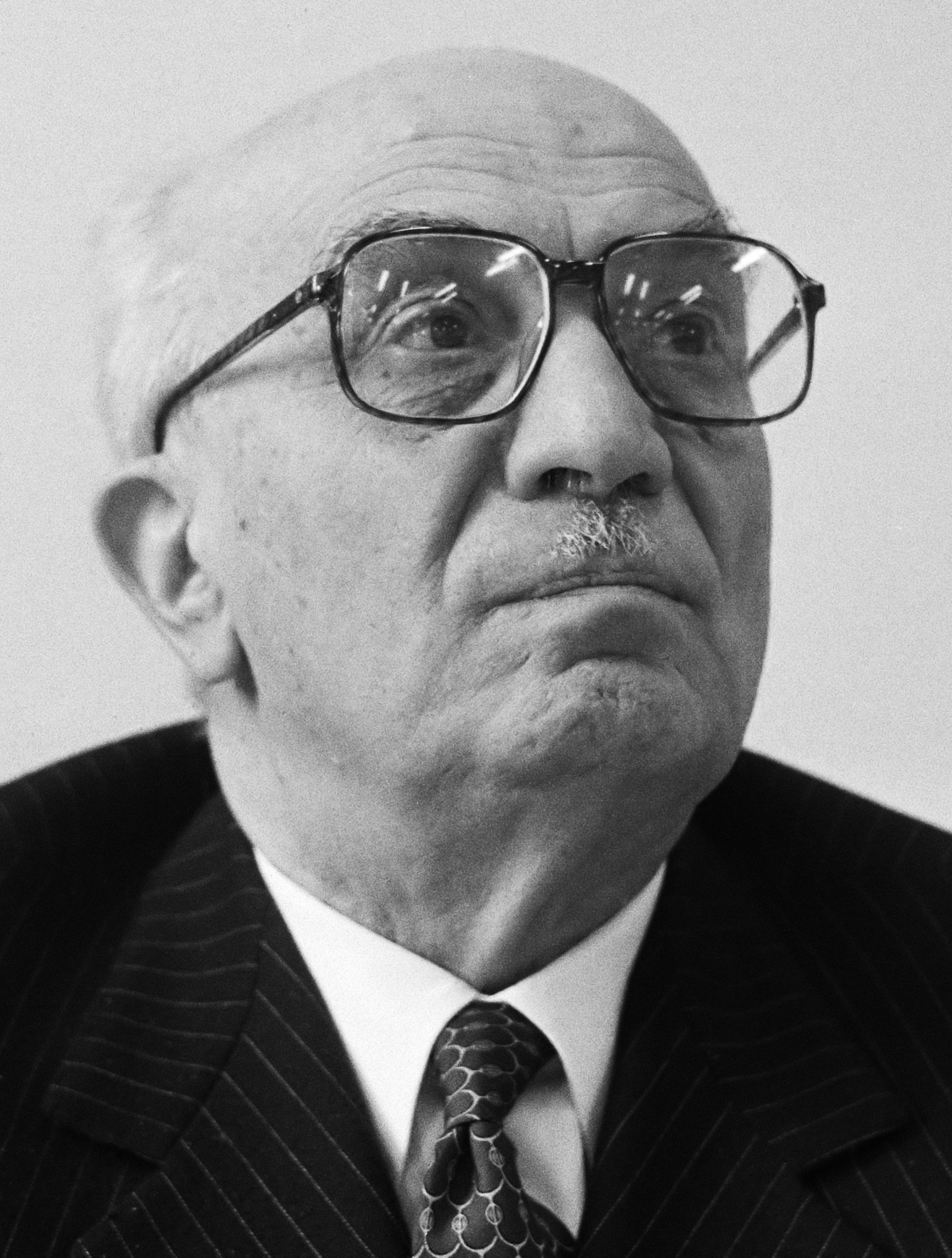
(Italy) Italy
Amintore Fanfani,
Prime Minister

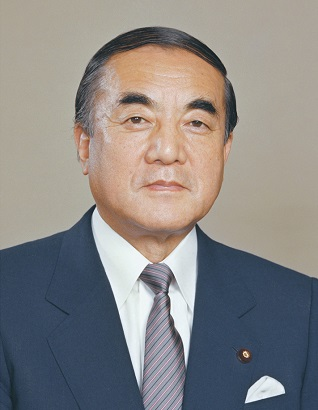
(Japan) Japan
Yasuhiro Nakasone,
Prime Minister

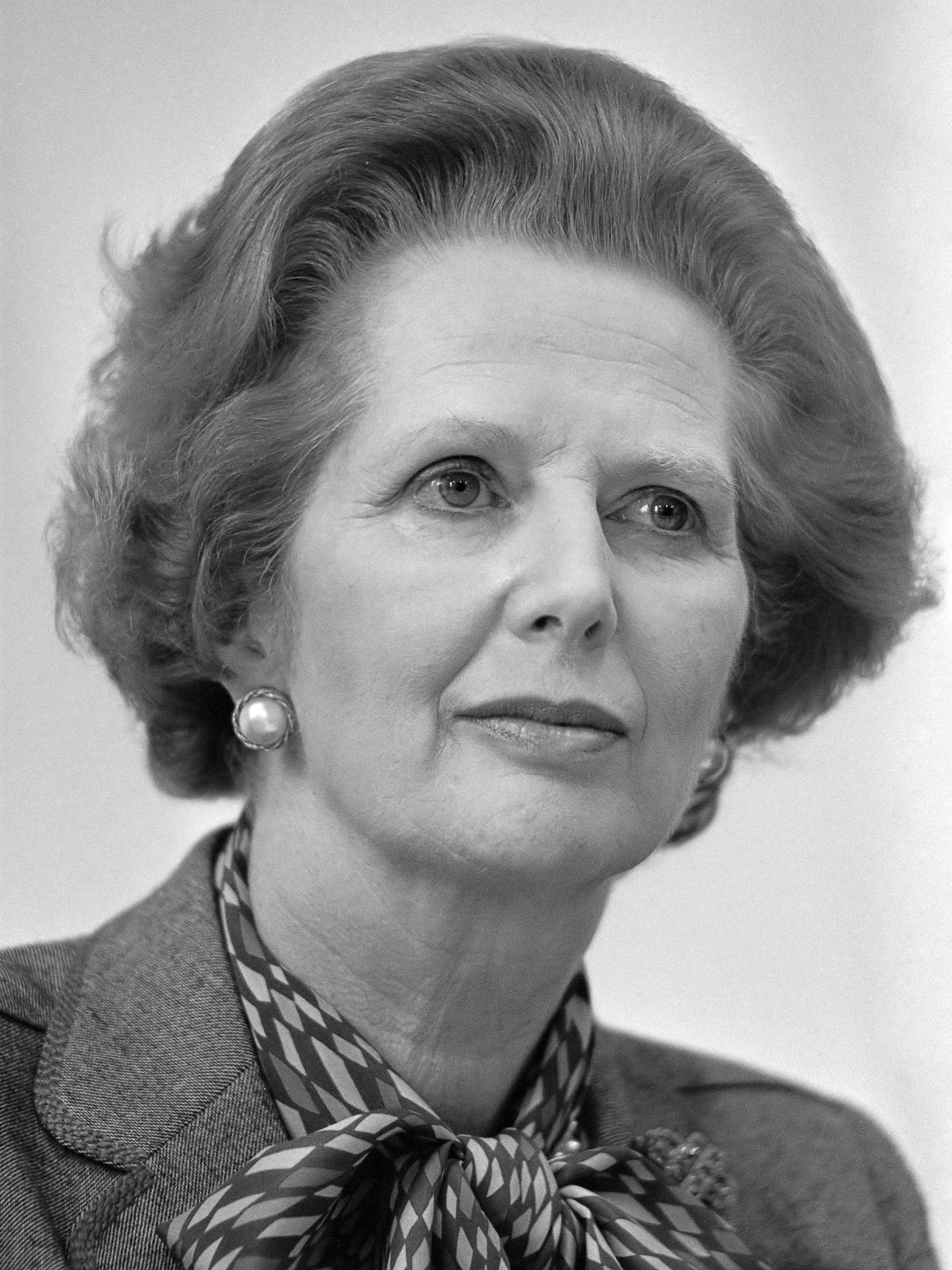
(United Kingdom) United Kingdom
Margaret Thatcher,
Prime Minister

(United States) United States
Ronald Reagan,
President (Host)
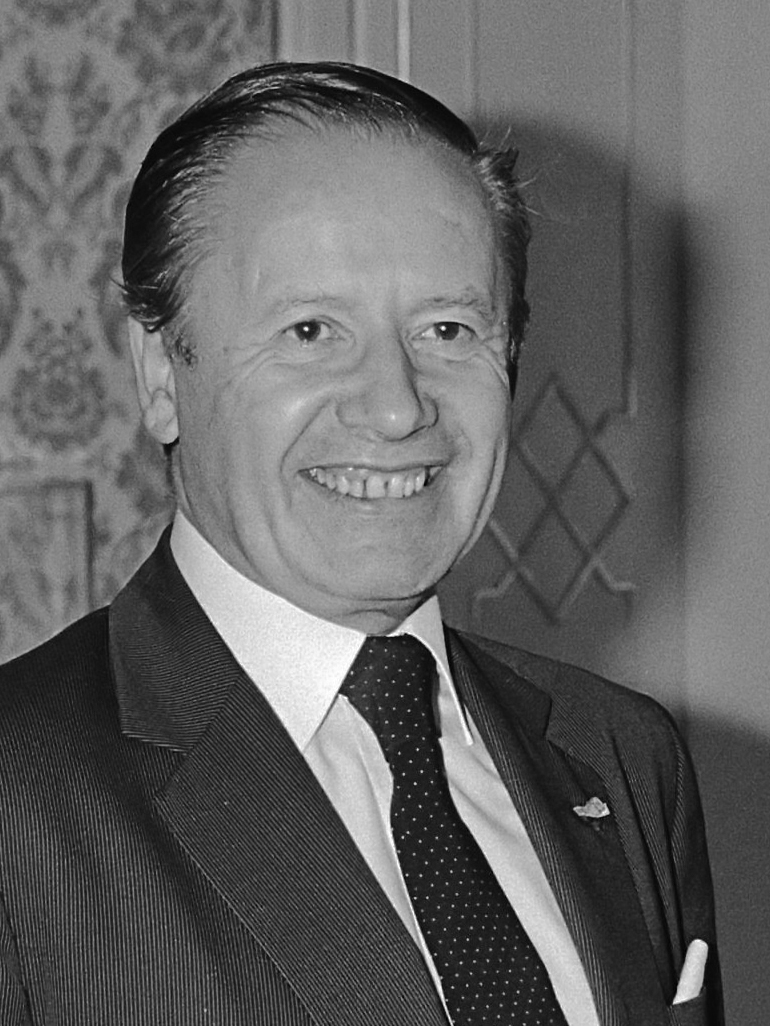
(European Union) European Commission
Gaston Thorn,
President

== See also ==
- G8
