= Quarter dollar =

Quarter-unit of currencies named "dollar"

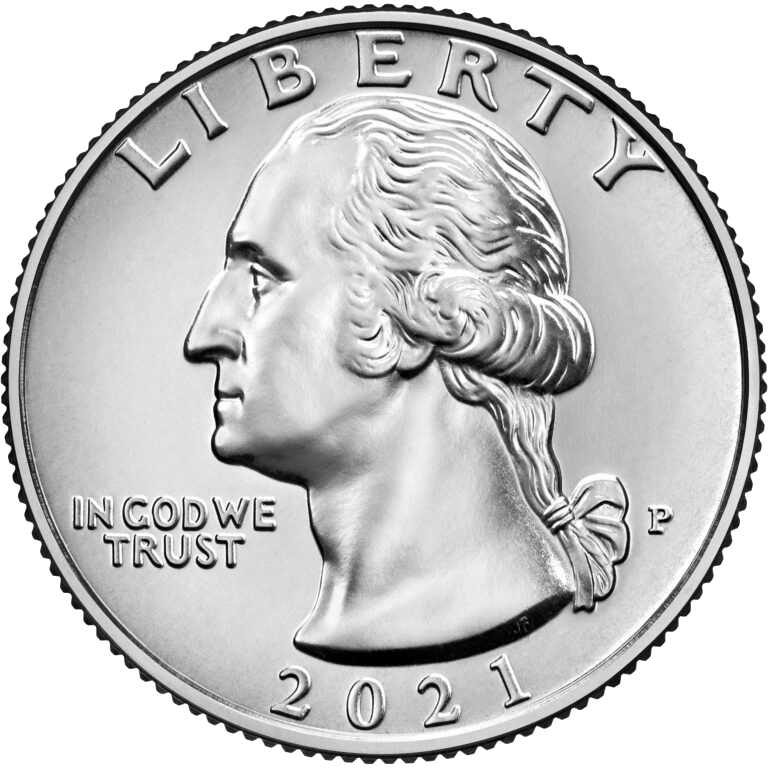
The obverse side of a United States quarter

The term "quarter dollar" refers to a quarter-unit of several currencies that are named "dollar". One dollar ($1) is normally divided into subsidiary currency of 100 cents, so a quarter dollar is equal to 25 cents. These quarter dollars (aka quarters) are denominated as either coins or as banknotes. Although more than a dozen countries have their own unique dollar currency, not all of them use quarters. This article only includes quarters that were intended for circulation, those that add up to units of dollars, and those in the form of a coin.

== Currently minted ==
Circulating Quarter dollars by country
Country(s) / City	Unit of currency	Technical parameters (Note: The "mass" and "diameters" shown here have been rounded to the nearest tenth.)				Description			Date of first minting (Note: Some countries have had many varieties and forms of quarters. The dates used in this table reflect when the current form (design/metal base) was first issued.)
Country(s) / City	Unit of currency	Diameter	Thickness	Weight	Composition	Edge	Obverse	Reverse	Date of first minting
Anguilla	XCD	24.0 mm	N/A	6.5 g	75% copper 25% nickel	Ribbed	British monarch	Value, year of minting, "East Caribbean States", sailing ship	2002
Antigua and Barbuda	XCD	24.0 mm	N/A	6.5 g	75% copper 25% nickel	Ribbed	British monarch	Value, year of minting, "East Caribbean States", sailing ship	2002
Barbados	BBD	23.7 mm	1.8 mm	5.1 g	Nickel-plated steel	Reeded	Coat of arms of Barbados	Morgan Lewis windmill	2007
(The Bahamas) Bahamas	BSD	24.26 mm	1.7 mm	5.1 g			Coat of arms of the Bahamas	A native sloop	
Belize	BZD	N/A	N/A	N/A	75% copper 25% nickel	N/A	British monarch	Ornamental - Country/Value/Date	1981
Bermuda	BMD	25.0 mm	N/A	5.9 g	75% copper 25% nickel	Milled	British monarch	Coat of arms	1970
Canada	CAD	23.9 mm	1.6 mm	4.4 g	94% steel, 3.8% copper, 2.2% nickel plating	Milled	British monarch	Caribou	2000
Cayman Islands	KYD	24.3 mm	1.6 mm	5.1 g	Nickel-plated steel	Smooth	British monarch	Schooner "Kirk B"	1999
Dominica	XCD	24.0 mm	N/A	6.5 g	75% copper 25% nickel	Ribbed	British monarch	Value, year of minting, "East Caribbean States", sailing ship	2002
Grenada	XCD	24.0 mm	N/A	6.5 g	75% copper 25% nickel	Ribbed	British monarch	Value, year of minting, "East Caribbean States", sailing ship	2002
Liberia	LRD	23.0 mm	1.8 mm	4.5 g	Nickel Clad Steel	Reeded	Head with headress and country name	Value/Date within wreath	2000
Montserrat	XCD	24.0 mm	N/A	6.5 g	75% copper 25% nickel	Ribbed	British monarch	Value, year of minting, "East Caribbean States", sailing ship	2002
Saint Kitts and Nevis	XCD	24.0 mm	N/A	6.5 g	75% copper 25% nickel	Ribbed	British monarch	Value, year of minting, "East Caribbean States", sailing ship	2002
Saint Lucia	XCD	24.0 mm	N/A	6.5 g	75% copper 25% nickel	Ribbed	British monarch	Value, year of minting, "East Caribbean States", sailing ship	2002
Saint Vincent and the Grenadines	XCD	24.0 mm	N/A	6.5 g	75% copper 25% nickel	Ribbed	British monarch	Value, year of minting, "East Caribbean States", sailing ship	2002
The Bahamas	BSD	24.3 mm	1.7 mm	5.0 g	Nickel-plated steel	Reeded	Coat of Arms	Bahamian sloop	2007
Trinidad and Tobago	TTD	N/A	N/A	N/A	75% copper 25% nickel	N/A	Coat of Arms	Value	1976
United States and others	USD	24.3 mm	N/A	5.7 g	75% copper 25% nickel	Reeded	George Washington	Eagle	2022
Zimbabwe	N/A	23.0 mm	N/A	4.8 g	Nickel-plated steel	N/A	RBZ in various positions with coin date	Enclosed in circle with "25" surrounded by "TWENTY-FIVE CENTS BOND COIN"	2014

== See also ==
- Surinamese dollar
- Twenty-five cent coin (Netherlands)
