= Belize dollar =

Currency of Belize

- Obverse of the 2025 $2 banknote

ISO 4217
- Code: BZD (numeric: 084)
- Subunit: 0.01

Units of account
- Symbol: $
- Subunit
- 1/100: cent

Denominations
- Banknotes: $2, $5, $10, $20, $50, $100
- Coins: 1, 5, 10, 25, 50 cents, $1

Demographics
- User(s): Belize

Issuance
- Central bank: Board of Commissioners of Currency of British Honduras (1894–1976); Belize Monetary Authority (1976–1981); Central Bank of Belize (1981–)
- Website: www.centralbank.org.bz

Valuation
- Inflation: 3.1%
- Source: Statistical Institute of Belize, August 2024
- Method: Consumer price index
- Pegged with: United States dollar
- Value: 2 BZD = 1 USD

The Belize dollar (also known as the Belizean dollar), known until 1973 as the British Honduras dollar, is the official currency in Belize (currency code BZD). It is normally abbreviated with the dollar sign $, or alternatively BZ$ to distinguish it from other dollar-denominated currencies.

It is divided into 100 cents. The official value is pegged at BZ$2 = US$1.

== History ==
In 1825, an imperial order-in-council was passed for the purpose of introducing the British sterling coinage into all the British colonies. This order-in-council made sterling coinage legal tender; it set the exchange rate between sterling and the Spanish dollar at $1 = 4s 4d. This exchange rate was supposed to be based on the value of the silver in the Spanish dollars as compared to the value of the gold in the British sovereigns. The realistic exchange rate would have been $4.80 = £1 (equivalent to $1 = 4s 2d), and so the unrealistic exchange rate that was contained in the 1825 order-in-council led to the initiative being largely a failure. Remedial legislation came about in 1838 with a new order-in-council, which did not apply to the British North American colonies due to minor rebellions in Upper and Lower Canada. The 1838 legislation introduced the correct rating of $1 = 4s 2d.

When the original order-in-council of 1825 was introduced in Jamaica, Bermuda, and British Honduras, the local authorities set aside the mistaken rating of $1 = 4s 4d, and they unofficially used the alternative rating of $1 = 4s. The Bahamas would later adopt this same approach. When the 1838 remedial legislation came into force, sterling was well established in these territories, the Spanish dollar had been barred from circulation, and the authorities had no desire to adopt the devaluation that would have been associated with the correct rating of $1 = 4s 2d. The British shilling, referred to locally as a 'Maccaroni', was equal to one quarter of a dollar, and the system was working very satisfactorily.

For a period in the middle of the nineteenth century British Honduras operated the British sterling monetary system just like Jamaica and Bermuda. In the wake of the international silver crisis of 1873 the silver peso of neighbouring Guatemala drove the British currency out of circulation. In an attempt to return British Honduras to the gold standard, and influenced by the fact that most imports were coming from New Orleans in the United States, a new currency was introduced into British Honduras based on the US dollar, bringing British Honduras into line with Canada.

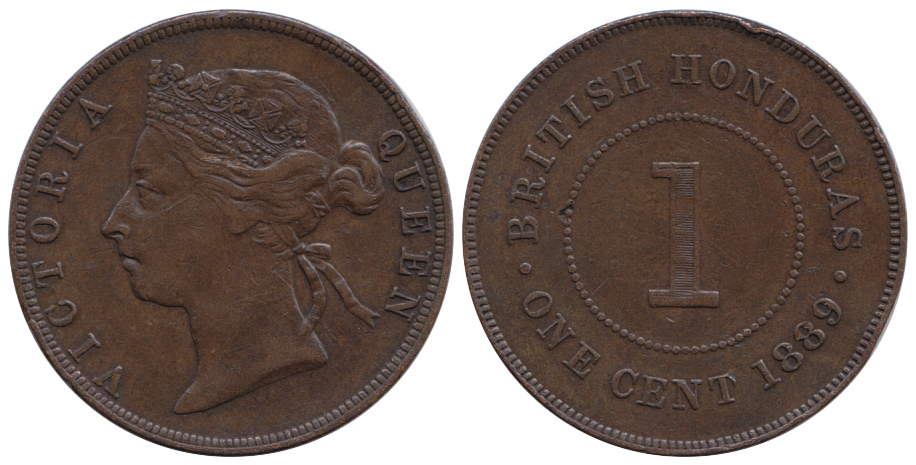
1 cent 1889 British Honduras, Queen Victoria

At that time, the Canadian dollar was on the gold standard, and one Canadian dollar was equal to one American dollar. This is the point where the currency history of British Honduras diverges from that of the rest of the British West Indies. In 1885, 1 cent coins were issued, followed by higher denominations in 1894. This year also saw the first issue of banknotes by the government and a switch from the silver Guatemalan peso to the gold U.S. dollar as the base for the currency, with $4.866 = 1 pound. The rate of $4.866 as opposed to $4.80 is explained by the fact that when the US dollar was first created in 1792, it was based on the average weight of a selection of worn Spanish dollars. Hence, the US dollar was at a slight discount in relation to the Spanish dollar. Following the introduction of the US dollar gold standard to British Honduras, the 25 cent coins were referred to as shillings due to their closeness in value to shilling sterling.

When the United Kingdom abandoned the gold standard in 1931, the British Honduras dollar continued with its attachment to the US dollar and as such it did not become part of the sterling bloc. At the outbreak of the second world war, unlike in the case of Canada, Newfoundland, and Hong Kong, British Honduras did join the sterling area even though it maintained its fixed exchange rate with respect to the US dollar. The sterling bloc should not be confused with the sterling area. The former was a group of countries who pegged their local currencies to sterling when the United Kingdom abandoned the gold standard in 1931, whereas the latter was an exchange control arrangement introduced as an emergency measure at the outbreak of the second world war.

In 1949 the British pound was devalued from US$4.03 to US$2.80. Since the British Honduras dollar was pegged to the US dollar, this caused a sudden increase in the value of the British Honduran dollar relative to the pound. Protests ensued which led to a devaluation of the British Honduran dollar to a value of 70 U.S. cents (equal to 5 shillings sterling).

Following Harold Wilson's devaluation of sterling in November 1967, the British Honduran dollar again devalued in sympathy with the British pound to 60 US cents. In 1978, the link to the British pound of BZ$4 = £1 was abandoned and once again the Belize unit was pegged to the US dollar at a fixed rate of BZ$2 = US$1. The current rate with the US dollar reflects the devaluation of 50% in relation to the original parity with the US dollar in 1885, which last applied in 1949.

== Coins ==
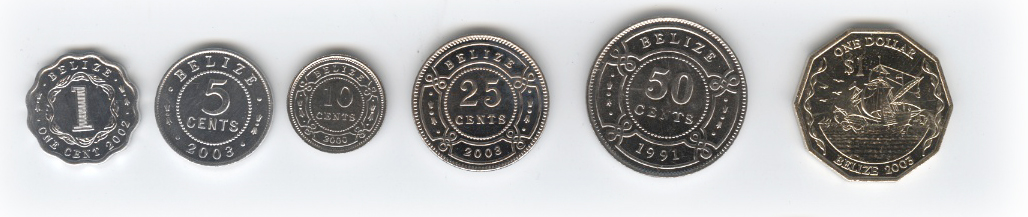
The coins of Belize

In 1885, bronze 1 cent coins were introduced, followed by silver 5, 10, 25 and 50 cents in 1894. These coins were minted at the Royal Mint and their style was similar to that of other British colonial dollar fractional coinage used in Hong Kong and Canada. Cupronickel replaced silver in the 5 cents in 1907. This was itself replaced by nickel-brass in 1942.

In 1952, cupro-nickel replaced silver in the 25 cent coins, with the same happening for the 50 and 10 cents in 1954 and 1956, respectively. Following a reduction in size in 1954, the 1 cent coin switched to a scalloped shape in 1956. In 1976, aluminium 1 and 5 cent coins were introduced. A nickel-brass, decagonal 1 dollar coin was introduced in 1990.

== Banknotes ==
Obverse of the 2003 banknote series

The Board of Commissioners of Currency operated from 1894 to 1976. In 1894, the government introduced notes in denominations of 1, 2, 5, 10, 50 and 100 dollars. Production of 50 and 100 dollars ceased after 1928. 20 dollar notes were introduced in 1952. British Honduras was officially renamed Belize in 1973, and the following year a new family of notes was introduced with the new country name. On November 1, 1976, the Monetary Authority of Belize was established, and took over note issuance. The first and only notes issued under its name were dated 1ST JUNE 1980, and included a 100-dollar note for the first time. The Central Bank of Belize was established on January 1, 1982, by the Central Bank of Belize Act No. 15 (Chapter 262 of the Laws of Belize Revised Edition 2000).

The first notes issued under its name were dated 1ST JULY 1983. Production of 50 dollar notes recommenced in 1990, the same year that the 1 dollar note was issued for the last time, and then replaced by a coin. On April 30, 2012, the Central Bank of Belize issued a $20 commemorative note dated 01.01.12 (January 1, 2012) to celebrate the 30th anniversary of the Central Bank. It is similar to the current issue $20 note, but with the addition of the jabiru stork and the commemorative text "30th anniversary Central Bank of Belize". On the back of the commemorative note is the headquarters of the Central Bank of Belize in Belize City.

The Queen of Belize, Elizabeth II, appeared on all banknotes issued by the Central Bank of Belize. In July 2023 it was decided that future Belizean dollar bills would not feature King Charles III. New bills would instead depict Belizean nationals heroes including the late Right Honourable and Father of Belize’s Independence George Cadle Price and the Father of Democracy, the late Honourable Philip Goldson. The new design was unveiled in January 2025 including modern security features, and national symbols.

2025 series
Value	Dimensions	Main colour	Description			Date of	
Value	Dimensions	Main colour	Obverse	Reverse	Watermark	printing	issue
$2	140 × 70 mm	Violet	Philip Goldson	Antelope waterfall in Mayflower Bocawina National Park	Philip Goldson and "2"	1 February 2025	4 August 2025
$5	140 × 70 mm	Red	George Cadle Price	National Assembly building at Independence Plaza in Belmopan	George Cadle Price and "5"	1 February 2025	4 August 2025
$10	140 × 70 mm	Green	Philip Goldson	Keel-billed toucan, long-billed hermit, scaly-breasted hummingbird	Philip Goldson and "10"	1 February 2025	4 August 2025
$20	140 × 70 mm	Brown	George Cadle Price	Jaguar, green iguana	George Cadle Price and "20"	1 February 2025	4 August 2025
$50	150 × 75 mm	Burgundy	Philip Goldson	Mayan ruins	Philip Goldson and "50"	1 February 2025	4 August 2025
$100	150 × 75 mm	Blue	George Cadle Price	Queen triggerfish, hawksbill sea turtle, French angelfish	George Cadle Price and "100"	1 February 2025	4 August 2025

== Exchange rate ==
Current BZD exchange rates
From Google Finance:	AUD CAD CHF CNY EUR GBP HKD JPY USD
From Yahoo! Finance:	AUD CAD CHF CNY EUR GBP HKD JPY USD
From XE.com:	AUD CAD CHF CNY EUR GBP HKD JPY USD
From OANDA:	AUD CAD CHF CNY EUR GBP HKD JPY USD

== See also ==
- Economy of Belize
- Central banks and currencies of the Caribbean
