= Economy of Belize =

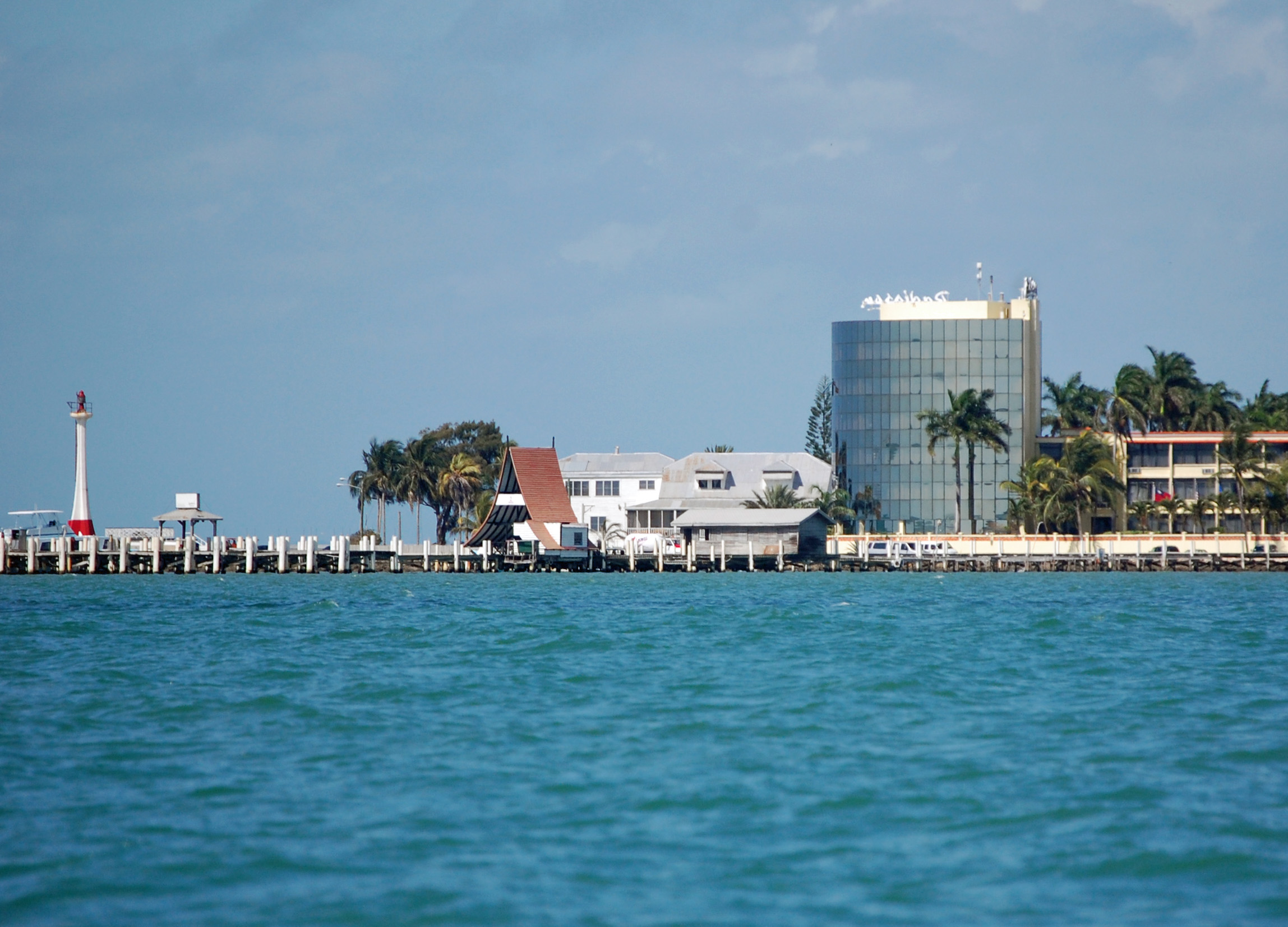
- Belize City
- Currency: Belize dollar (BZD, BZ$)
- Fiscal year: 1 April – 31 March
- Trade organisations: CARICOM, WTO
- Country group: Developing/Emerging; Upper-middle income economy

Statistics
- GDP: ▲$3.6 billion (nominal; 2025); ▲$6.67 billion (PPP; 2025)
- GDP rank: 166th (nominal; 2025); 171st (PPP; 2025)
- GDP growth: 2.5% (2026)
- GDP per capita: ▲$8,650 (nominal; 2025); ▲$15,980 (PPP; 2025)
- GDP per capita rank: 108th (nominal; 2025); 109th (PPP; 2025)
- GDP per capita growth: 2.0% (2024)
- GDP by sector: agriculture: 13%; industry: 23%; services: 64%; (2012 est.)
- Inflation (CPI): 0.294% (2018)
- Population below national poverty line: 41.3% (2009); 53% on less than $5.50/day (1999)
- Human Development Index: ▼0.683 medium (2021) (123rd); ▼0.535 low IHDI (2021)
- Labour force: ▲184,610 (2019); ▲59.8% employment rate (2017); note: shortage of skilled labor and all types of technical personnel
- Labour force by occupation: Agriculture: 10.2%; industry: 18.1%; services: 71.7%; (2007 est.)
- Unemployment: 11.1% (2016)
- Main industries: Garment production, food processing, tourism, construction, oil

External
- Exports: $633 million (2013 est.)
- Export goods: Sugar, bananas, citrus, clothing, fish products, molasses, wood, crude oil
- Main export partners: United States 21.7%; United Kingdom 16.1%; Guatemala 9.85%; Spain 7.2% (2022)
- Import goods: Machinery and transport equipment, manufactured goods, fuels, chemicals, pharmaceuticals, food, beverages, tobacco
- Main import partners: United States 33.3%; China 22.5%; Guatemala 9.28%; Mexico 7.75% (2022)
- Gross external debt: $1.048 billion (December 2013 est.)

Public finance
- Government debt: $1.229 billion (2013 est.)
- Revenue: 410.1 million (2013 est.)
- Spending: 352.4 million (2013 est.)
- Credit rating: Standard & Poor's: CC (Domestic); CC (Foreign); CC (T&C Assessment)
- All values, unless otherwise stated, are in US dollars.

Belize has a developing economy. It is a small, essentially private enterprise economy that is based primarily on agriculture, tourism, and services. The cultivation of newly discovered oil in the town of Spanish Lookout has presented new prospects and problems for this developing nation. Belize's primary exports are citrus, sugar, and bananas. Belize's trade deficit has been growing, mostly as a result of low export prices for sugar and bananas.

The new government faces important challenges to economic stability. Rapid action to improve tax collection has been promised, but a lack of progress in reining in spending could bring the exchange rate under pressure. The Belize dollar is fixed to the U.S. dollar at a rate of 2:1.

The domestic industry is limited, constrained by relatively high-cost labour and energy and a small domestic market. Tourism attracts the most foreign direct investment although significant foreign investment is also found in the energy, telecommunications, and agricultural sectors. Belize is considered a tax haven.

== History ==
Belize's economy depended on forestry until well into the 20th century. Logwood, used to make dye, was Belize's initial main export. However, the supply outstripped the demand, especially as Europeans developed man-made dyes which were less expensive. Loggers turned to mahogany, which grew in abundance in the country's forests. The wood was prized for use in cabinets, ships, and railroad carriers.

While many merchants and traders became wealthy from the mahogany industry, ups and downs in the market had a large impact on the economy. In addition, new mahogany trees weren't being planted because mahogany trees grow slowly; the rate of natural regrowth necessitated a large, long-term investment in tree farming, which was not made. As the 19th century progressed, loggers were forced to go deeper into the forests to find the trees, increasing labour costs.

Variations in mahogany exports over long periods of time were linked to the accessible supply of the resource. Thus, improvements in hauling methods helped the cutters satisfy increasing demands for mahogany by enabling them to extract timber from areas in the interior that had been previously inaccessible to them. Immediately after the introduction of cattle in the early 19th century, tractors in the 1920s, and lorries in the 1940s, production levels rose dramatically.

When the supply of accessible timber dwindled and logging became too unprofitable in the 20th century, the country's economy shifted to new sectors. Cane sugar became the principal export and recently has been augmented by expanded production of citrus, bananas, seafood, and apparel. The country has about 8,090 km^{2} of arable land, only a small fraction of which is under cultivation. To curb land speculation, the government enacted legislation in 1973 that requires non-Belizeans to complete a development plan on land they purchase before obtaining title to plots of more than 10 acres (40,000 m^{2}) of rural land or more than one-half acre (2,000 m^{2}) of urban land.

== Economic sectors ==
=== Agriculture ===
Banana production accounted for 16 percent of total Belizean exports in 1999.

Citrus fruits are Belize's second most important agricultural crop.

In 2018, Belize produced 1.7 million tons of sugarcane, being heavily dependent on this product. In addition to sugarcane, the country produced 100 thousand tons of orange, 80 thousand tons of banana, 77 thousand tons of maize, in addition to smaller productions of other agricultural products such as papaya, rice and soy.

=== Energy ===
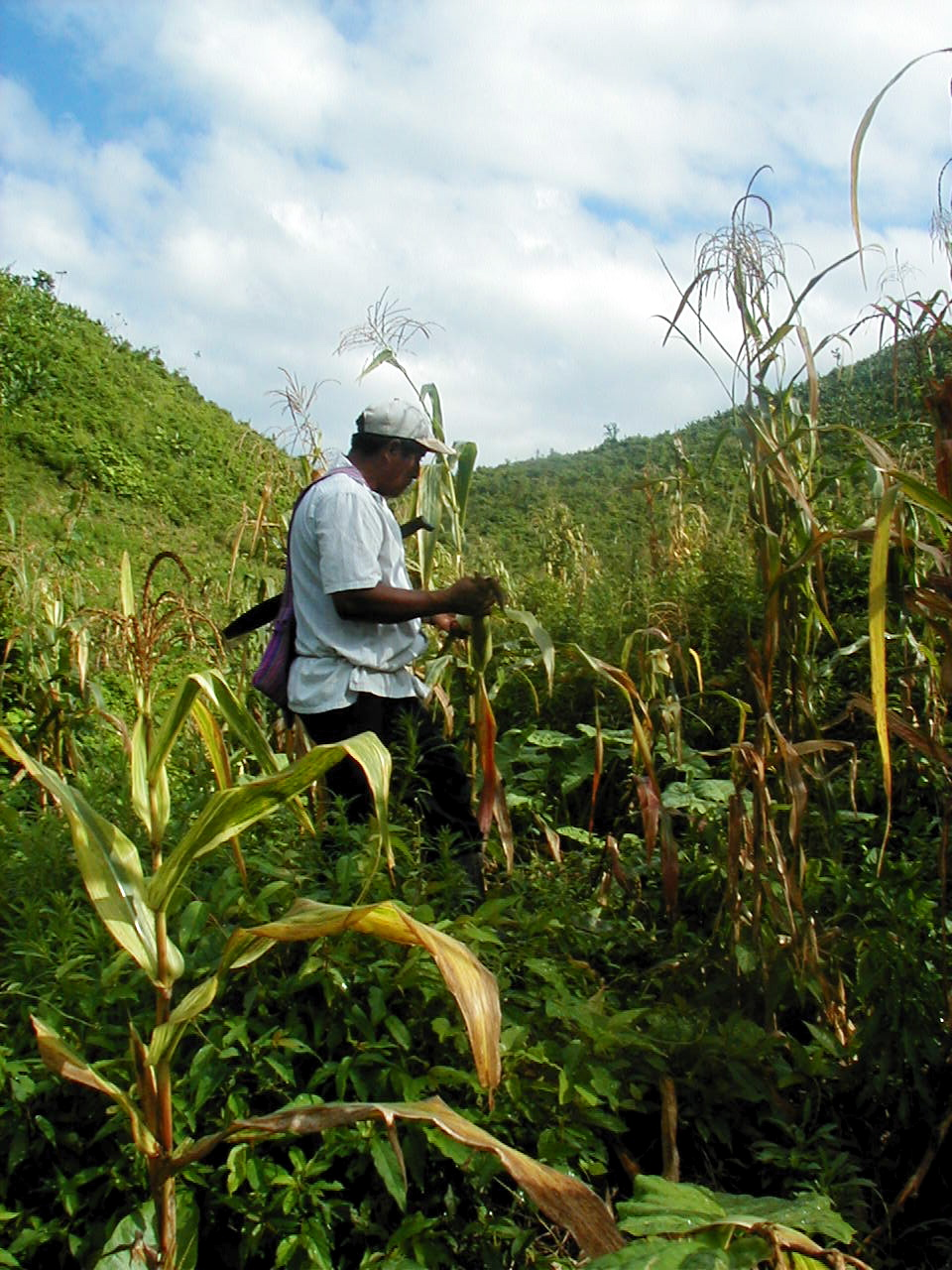
Agriculture is a key part of the economy

A major constraint on a functioning market economy in Belize continues to be the scarcity of infrastructure investments. Although electricity, telephone, and water utilities are all relatively good, Belize has the most expensive electricity in the region. Several capital projects are currently underway. The largest of these is a $15 million rural electrification program to be jointly implemented by the government and Belize Electricity Limited (BEL).

=== Tourism ===
A combination of factors—climate, the Belize Barrier Reef (longest in the Western Hemisphere), 127 offshore Cayes (islands), excellent fishing, safe waters for boating, scuba diving, and snorkeling, abundant jungle flora and fauna, and numerous Mayan ruins—support the thriving tourism and ecotourism industry. Development costs are high, but the Government of Belize has designated tourism as its second development priority after agriculture.

In 2011, tourist arrivals totaled 888,191 (mostly from the U.S.) and tourist receipts amounted to $260 million. The travel and tourism industry in 2011 directly contributed 350.6 million BZD (176 million USD) to Belize's GDP (12.0% of GDP). This primarily reflects the economic activity directly generated by industries supported by tourists, such as hotels, restaurants, leisure industries, travel agents, airlines and other transportation services. The total contribution to GDP in 2011 (including wider effects from investment, the supply chain, and induced income impacts) was 971.9 million BZD (US$486 million) (33.2% of GDP). Travel and tourism directly generated 14,500 jobs in 2011 (10.9% of total employment) and, including indirect and induced effects, supported 40,000 jobs (30.1% of total employment).

=== Transport ===
The road network in Belize consists of over 1,900 miles (3,000 km) of roads, of which approximately 357 miles (575 km) is paved. There is no active rail transport in Belize. The ports of Belize in Belize City, Dangriga, and Big Creek handle regularly scheduled shipping from the U.S. and the United Kingdom although draft is limited to a maximum of 10 feet in Belize City and 15 feet in southern ports. International air service are handled by multiple airports in Belize and is provided by WestJet, American Airlines, Delta Air Lines, United Airlines and TACA to/from gateways in Toronto, Dallas, Houston, Atlanta, Charlotte, North Carolina, Miami, and San Salvador.

== Trade ==
Exports of Belize by product category (2019) Chemical products Transportation Machines Mineral products Plastics and rubbers Metals Foodstuffs Precious metals Textiles Instruments Animal products Vegetable products Paper goods Footwear and headwear Miscellaneous Stone and glass Wood products Animal and vegetable bi-products Animal hides Arts and antiques Weapons

Belize's economic performance is highly susceptible to external market changes. Although moderate growth has been achieved in recent years, the achievements are vulnerable to world commodity price fluctuations and continuation of preferential trading agreements, especially with the U.S. (cane sugar) and UK (bananas).

Belize continues to rely heavily on foreign trade with the United States as its number one trading partner. Total imports in 2000 totaled $446 million while total exports were only $349.9 million. In 2000, the U.S. accounted for 48.5% of Belize's total exports and provided 49.7% of all Belizean imports. Other major trading partners include the European Union through the Caribbean Forum (CARIFORUM), Canada, Mexico, and Caribbean Community (CARICOM) member states. Belize established a preferential trade agreement with Guatemala in 2010.

Belize aims to stimulate the growth of commercial agriculture through CARICOM. Belizean trade with the rest of the Caribbean is small compared to that with the United States and Europe. Belize is a beneficiary of the Caribbean Basin Initiative (CBI), a U.S. Government program to stimulate investment in Caribbean nations by providing duty-free access to the U.S. market for most Caribbean products.

Significant U.S. private investments in citrus and shrimp farms have been made in Belize under CBI. U.S. trade preferences allowing for duty-free re-import of finished apparel cut from U.S. textiles have significantly expanded the apparel industry. EU and UK preferences also have been vital for the expansion and prosperity of the sugar and banana industries.

== Belize International Business Companies ==
In 1990, Belize enacted the International Business Companies Act based on the British Virgin Islands model. In ten years, Belize has registered more than 15,000 IBCs. A Belizean IBC is a corporate vehicle for international financial transactions and allows the investor to engage in activities including asset protection, operating bank accounts, brokerage accounts, ship ownership, and commission arrangements.

The IBC legislation was supplemented in 1992 with the enactment of a Trusts Act which provides for both onshore and offshore trusts.

Belize IBCs have the following features.

Progressive legislation

- The IBC Act was introduced in 1990 to implement competitive offshore legislation for Belize IBCs which was subsequently amended to reflect the changes required to provide efficient Belize offshore services.

Efficient incorporation/registration

- Belize incorporation is very efficient under normal circumstances, a Belize IBC can be incorporated in a couple of working days.

Flexibility in company structure

- There is no requirement for a secretary, resident or otherwise
- Only one director or shareholder required for the company formation
- Shareholder(s) and director(s) may be the same person
- The shareholder(s) and director(s) can be a natural person or a corporate body
- There is no requirement for appointing local shareholder(s) and director(s)

Privacy of identity of principals

- The documents for Belize offshore Incorporation do not carry the name or identity of any shareholder or director. The names or identities of these persons do not appear in any public record.

Taxation in Belize

- According to the IBC Act of 1990, offshore companies are exempted from all taxes.

== Data ==
Belize electricity supply by source

The following table shows the main economic indicators in 1980–2017.

Year	GDP (in bil. US$ PPP)	GDP per capita (in US$ PPP)	GDP (in bil. US$ nominal)	GDP growth (real)	Inflation (in Percent)	Unemployment rate (in Percent)
1980	0.20	1,367	0.23	5.0%	7.0%	...
1985	0.29	1,717	0.28	−1.4%	4.1%	...
1990	0.62	3,281	0.55	11.2%	2.0%	15.00%
1995	0.94	4,324	0.82	0.7%	2.9%	12.50%
2000	1.36	5,456	1.12	13.0%	0.6%	11.40%
2005	1.98	6,799	1.46	2.6%	3.7%	11.00%
2006	2.14	7,098	1.58	4.6%	4.2%	9.40%
2007	2.22	7,126	1.70	1.1%	2.3%	8.50%
2008	2.34	7,254	1.73	3.2%	6.4%	8.20%
2009	2.37	7,350	1.68	0.8%	−1.1%	13.05%
2010	2.48	7,668	1.74	3.3%	0.9%	13.50%
2011	2.59	7,785	1.82	2.1%	1.7%	13.95%
2012	2.73	8,017	1.90	3.7%	1.2%	14.40%
2013	2.80	7,994	2.03	0.7%	0.5%	11.70%
2014	2.96	8,295	2.14	4.0%	1.2%	11.06%
2015	3.11	8,480	2.21	3.8%	−0.9%	10.11%
2016	3.13	8,329	2.26	−0.5%	0.7%	7.97%
2017	3.21	8,324	2.29	0.8%	1.1%	8.99%

== See also ==
- List of companies of Belize
- Belize dollar
- Central Bank of Belize
- Ministry of Finance (Belize)
- National Trade Union Congress of Belize
- Economy of Central America
- List of Commonwealth of Nations countries by GDP
- List of Latin American and Caribbean countries by GDP growth
- List of Latin American and Caribbean countries by GDP (nominal)
- List of Latin American and Caribbean countries by GDP (PPP)
