= Edney Cain =

Belizean public servant (1924–2008)

Sir Edney Cain
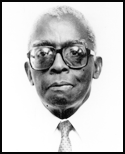
- Portrait of Sir Edney Cain
- Born: Henry Edney Conrad Cain; 2 December 1924; Belize
- Died: 17 January 2008 (aged 83); Belmopan, Belize
- Known for: Rebuilding Belize's foreign reserves
- Notable work: When the Angel Says "Write"!

Sir Henry Edney Conrad Cain OBE (2 December 1924 – 17 January 2008) was a Belizean accountant who dedicated 51 years of his life as a public servant. He was knighted in 1986 by Queen Elizabeth II and received the award of "Order of Distinguished Service" in 2006. He is recognized as a renowned Belizean because of his contribution to the stabilizing of Belize's high liquidity and payment problems in 1987 through which he rebuilt Belize's foreign reserves.

== Education ==
Sir Edney Cain began his education attending Ebenezer Primary School followed by St. George's College and St. Michael's College. He furthered his studies in 1953 and 1954 by taking courses in accountancy and audit in the United Kingdom at his own expense. He continued his professional training by receiving a certificate after sitting the Association of Certified & Corporation Accountant's Intermediate Examinations in 1954. Not stopping there, he continued his studies later receiving several accounting certificates; one being certification from the Association of Certified Corporate Accountant of the Carleton University in Ottawa, Canada.

== Government service ==
Sir Edney Cain began his service with the Government of Belize in 1940, at the age of 16, as a messenger at the Wireless Station and continued serving the government, climbing the organizational ladder. He became the first governor of the Central Bank of Belize in 1982, and, in 1984, he began his career as an ambassador and he held that title multiple times until 1990. His most significant contribution to the government was in 1987 when he joined the Ministry of Finance becoming the Financial Secretary.

This was a challenging time for Belize because of severe liquidity and payment problems that Belize was experiencing. At this time Belize was also in the middle of a Structural Adjustment Program with the International Monetary Fund. Cain resolved these problems within a period of 2 years in which he also rebuilt the foreign reserves. He continued serving the Government of Belize until he retired in December 1991.

=== Posts held ===
- Messenger at the Wireless Station, 1940
- Supernumerary Probationer and Junior clerk, 1942
- Third Class Clerk, 1945
- Second Class Clerk, 1946
- First Class Clerk at the Audit Department, 1953
- Examiner of Accounts and Sr. Examiner of Accounts, 1955
- Auditor in the Audit Department, 1959
- Assistant Accountant General, 1961
- Accountant General, 1963
- On special assignment to the Ministry of Finance and Economic Development, 1970
- First Managing Director of the Belize Monetary Authority, 1976
- First Governor of the Central Bank, 1982-1983
- Belize's first resident ambassador to the United States of America 1984
- Belize's non-resident High Commissioner to Canada, 1984
- Financial Secretary of the Ministry of Finance, 1987
- Belize's resident High Commissioner to the United Kingdom and Ambassador to France, Germany, Belgium and the Vatican, 1987–1990
- Governor of the Central Bank, 1991

== Honors ==
- Appointed a Member of the Order of the British Empire (MBE) in 1965
- Appointed an Officer of the Order of the British Empire (OBE) in 1975
- Knighted by Queen Elizabeth II in 1986
- Received the award of "Order of Distinguished Service" at Belize's 25th anniversary of Independence in 2006.
- On June 26, 2008 the New Administration Building in Belmopan was renamed to the "Sir Edney Cain Building" in his honor of being such a large contributor to the financial stability of Belize.

== Literature ==
- Collection of poems written in 1948 entitled When the Angel Says "Write"!.

== Death ==
After battling cancer for eight years, Sir Edney Cain died at the age of 83 in his home in Belmopan on 17 January 2008. Five days later, a state funeral was held for him at the Wesley Methodist Church in Belize City.
