= Joy Grant =

Belizean politician

Joy Grant CMG
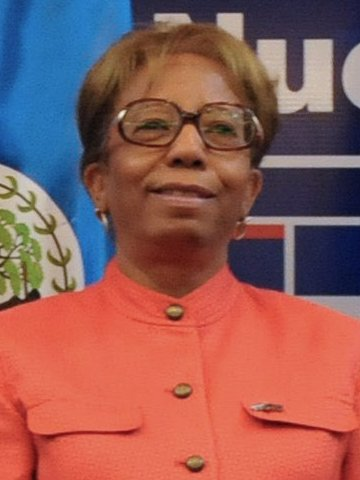
- Grant in 2012

Governor of the Central Bank of Belize
- In office October 2016 – April 3, 2021
- Preceded by: Glenford Ysaguirre
- Succeeded by: Gustavo Maunel Vasquez

Head of the Ministry of Energy, Science & Technology and Public Utilities
- In office March 13, 2012 – October 2016

Ambassdor Exemplary and Plenipotentiary at the Embassy of Belize, Brussels, Belgium
- In office 2008–2012

Vice President and Managing Director of the Atlantic Conservation Region of the Nature Conservancy
- In office 2001–2005

Personal details
- Born: Audrey Joy Grant; 5 February 1951 (age 75) Belize City, British Honduras
- Education: University of Alberta
- Occupation: Politician

Audrey Joy Grant CMG (born 1951) was the governor of the Central Bank of Belize from 2016 to 2021. She was a Belizean Senator and the head of the Ministry of Energy, Science & Technology, and Public Utilities. After beginning her career in economic development projects, she became an environmental conservationist and developed numerous projects throughout the Caribbean region to protect forests and marine life.

== Biography ==
Audrey Joy Grant was born on 5 February 1951 in Belize City, British Honduras. After attending high school in Belize City, she worked for a year at Barclay's Bank and then moved to Canada for university studies. She earned an undergraduate degree in commerce and a Master of Business Administration in International Finance from the University of Alberta, Canada. Grant moved to Barbados, where she worked on economic development projects for thirteen countries from throughout the Caribbean at the Caribbean Development Bank. After eight years, she relocated to Washington, DC and began working at the Belize Embassy.

In 1989, Grant returned to Belize to spearhead a conservation project funded by the Massachusetts Audubon Society with help from the Nature Conservancy and US scientists. The project, Programme for Belize was a co-founded by Grant and she became its first executive director, acquiring over 300,000 acres (4% of Belize's land mass) of tropical rain forest as reserve for the project. At the time, conservation programs were in their infancy and she won two different sustainability certifications for her program of ecoforestry of Belizean mahogany. After over a decade with Programme for Belize, in 2001, Grant became vice president and managing director of the Atlantic Conservation Region of the Nature Conservancy. She oversaw conservation efforts in twenty of the eastern states of the US and 10 Central American and Caribbean countries, and in 2003 launched an effort to create a program which encompassed the Caribbean marine basin from Cuba to Venezuela. Leaving the Nature Conservancy in 2005, she began working as a senior director for the Natural Capital Project. In 2008, she was appointed as Ambassador Exemplary and Plenipotentiary at the Embassy of Belize, Brussels, Belgium; Ambassador Designate to the Kingdom of Spain and to the Netherlands, Germany, and France; and Ambassador Extraordinary and Plenipotentiary to the European Commission, which she continued until 2012. Grant was appointed to the committee to design the United Nations' Green Climate Fund in 2011.

In 2012, Grant was appointed as a Belizean Senator by Prime Minister Dean Barrow and appointed as the first Minister of Energy, Science & Technology and Public Utilities. The new ministry's goals were to develop a sustainable development plan by integrating policy and regulatory laws on energy, science and technology into national decision-making processes.
