= Ministry of Energy, Science & Technology and Public Utilities =

Government ministry of Belize

Agency overview
- Formed: 2012
- Jurisdiction: Belize
- Headquarters: Belmopan
- Minister responsible: Joy Grant
- Agency executive: Dr Colin Young
- Child agencies: Department of Geology and Petroleum; Energy Unit; Science and Technology Unit

The Ministry of Energy, Science & Technology, and Public Utilities (Belize) was founded in 2012. The Ministry is currently divided into the Department of Geology and Petroleum, the Energy Unit and the Science and Technology Unit. The Ministry is represented by Senator Joy Grant and CEO Dr Colin Young, and has an office in Belmopan.

== Geology and Petroleum Department ==
The Geology and Petroleum Department was established in 1984 as part of the Ministry of Natural Resources. In 2012, the department moved to the new Ministry of Energy, Science & Technology and Public Utilities. The department is responsible for governance of the petroleum industry in Belize. The department's mission statement is to "To accelerate the development of Belize’s petroleum resources through the creation of a vibrant petroleum industry, with the assistance of international investors, cognizant of environmental costs, thereby improving the welfare of Belizeans into the 21st century."

== Energy Unit ==
The Energy Unit was established in 2012 and has responsibility for governance of the energy sector in Belize. The Unit's mission statement is to "To plan, promote and effectively manage the production, delivery and use of energy through Energy Efficiency, Renewable Energy, and Cleaner Production interventions for the sustainable development of Belize." Key activities performed by the Energy Unit include data collection for the purpose of planning Belize's future energy supplies and calculating greenhouse gas emissions, public awareness on topics such as energy efficiency, as well as regulation and market reforms that promote a sustainable future for Belize.

== Science and Technology Unit ==
The Science and Technology Unit is responsible for the promotion of science and technology in Belize. The Unit plays a key role in Belize's efforts to achieve Target 8.f in the millennium development goals. The Unit conducts a number of activities that promote engagement with Science and Technology in Belize, including through the ICT roadshow.
