= Central Bank of Belize =

Monetary Authority of Belize

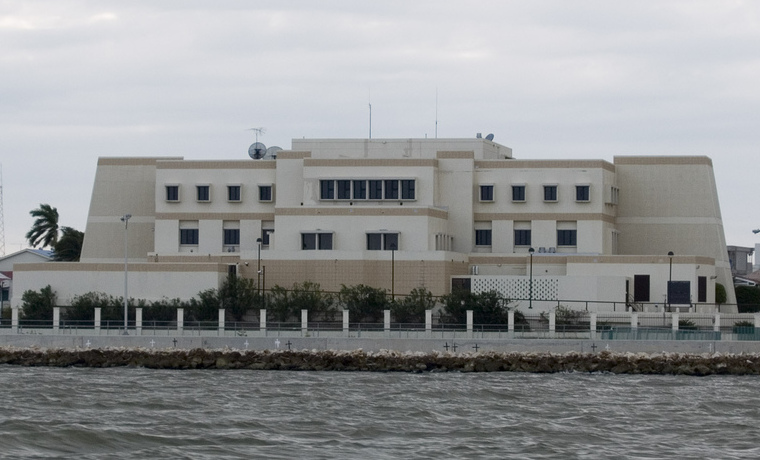
- The building of the Central Bank of Belize was built to look like a Mayan temple.
- Central bank of: Belize
- Headquarters: Belize City, Belize
- Coordinates: 17.498192°N 88.182993°W
- Established: January 1, 1982 (44 years ago)
- Ownership: 100% state ownership
- Governor: Kareem Michael
- Reserves: 400 million USD
- Preceded by: Board of Commissioners of Currency (1894–1976), Belize Monetary Authority (1976–1981)
- Website: www.centralbank.org.bz

The Central Bank of Belize (CBB) is the central bank of Belize, established in 1982. In 2021 Gustavo Manuel Vasquez was chosen to serve as Governor, replacing A. Joy Grant, who had served in the role since 2016.

== History ==
The Central Bank of Belize was established on January 1, 1982, by the Central Bank of Belize Act No. 15 (Chapter 262 of the Laws of Belize Revised Edition 2000). Its predecessors were the Board of Commissioners of Currency of Belize (1894-1976) and the Belize Monetary Authority (1976–1981). The Board of Commissioners had been held responsible for the devaluation crisis that led to the nationalist movement of the 1950s.

== Governors ==
- Edney Cain, January 1982 – October 1983
- Robert Clifton Swift, November 1983 – January 1986
- Alan Slusher, February 1986 – November 1990
- Edney Cain, January 1991 – December 1991
- Keith Arnold, January 1992 – March 2002
- Jorge Meliton Auil, April 2002 – September 2003
- Sydney Campbell, October 2003 – September 2008
- Glenford Ysaguirre, October 2008 – September 2016
- A. Joy Grant, October 2016 – April 2021
- Gustavo Manuel Vasquez, April 2021 – August 2021
- Kareem Michael, December 2021 – present

== See also ==
- Ministry of Finance (Belize)
- Belize dollar
- Economy of Belize
- List of central banks
