= Banana production in Belize =

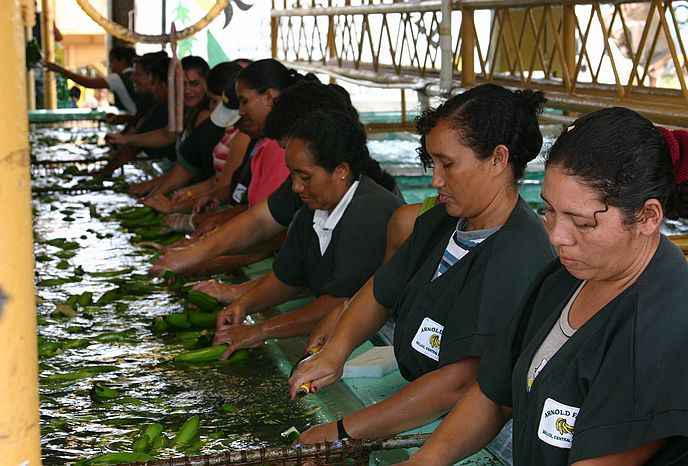
Banana sorting in Belize.

Banana production in Belize accounted for 16 percent of total Belizean exports in 1999.

Banana production was aided in the 1990s by privatization and market and production. Banana production in Belize fluctuates, falling from 68,000 metric tons (67,000 long tons; 75,000 short tons) in 1994 to 45,000 (44,000; 50,000) in 1995 before rising back to 78,000 (77,000; 86,000) in 1999.

Banana production in Belize began in the late nineteenth century when it was a British colony, when American and British investors established the first plantations. Over the last 70 years, the pattern of banana production has gradually shifted away from large scale American and British owned company production to smaller-scale localised indigenous farming primarily targeted at the European market.

== History ==
The Banana trade began between British Honduras and New Orleans. Commerce was wiped out in the 1920s by an outbreak of the Panama disease. Plantations were destroyed again by hurricanes in 1975 and 1978. The subsequent takeover of banana cultivation by the Banana Control Board, a public enterprise, had the effect of further inhibiting production.

By mid-1985, the Banana Control Board had accumulated debts of US$9 million. The government reacted to the plight of the board by selling the 880 hectares (2,200 acres) under cultivation to the private sector. Five years later, banana production had almost tripled, and the cultivated area had increased to more than 2,400 hectares (5,900 acres). The Banana Control Board was reorganized and retained the responsibility for marketing and research. In 1991 responsibility for the board was passed to the Banana Growers' Association.

Britain was the almost exclusive importer of Belizean bananas. Marketing of exports was handled by Fyffes, an Irish subsidiary of the United States company, United Fruit. The special provisions of the Lomé Convention's Banana Protocol allowed Britain to guarantee artificially high prices for bananas to the beneficiaries of the protocol. These prices were above prices in the United States and Germany. The purpose of this special provision was to protect the central export crop of some of the islands of the Lesser Antilles, members of the Commonwealth of Nations, from ruinous competition from low-cost producers in Latin America.

The preferential access to EEC markets provided by the Lomé Convention was under advisement in 1991 by the EEC in connection with its single-European-market program. It appeared that Belize would be better prepared for a drop in prices than would the islands of the Lesser Antilles, as Belizean producers received far lower prices through the protocol than did their Caribbean neighbors.

New port facilities at Big Creek in southern Stann Creek District were expected to increase banana exports. Until 1990 Belizean bananas had had to go through Puerto Cortés, Honduras, which added to overhead. Fyffes then financed the construction of Big Creek, Belize's only deep-water port. This port was designed to serve as the main shipment point for Belizean bananas.

Between 1989 and 1991, banana production was hampered by cold weather and black sigatoka disease, and production was expected to double in 1992 because of the new port, better disease control, and improved drainage and irrigation systems. The susceptibility of bananas to disease and possible changes in Belize's preferential access to the British market were factors that could limit growth in this sector.

Nearby countries have become infested with TR4. On August 27, 2019, the government banned the importation of banana materials and products from these countries in an effort to forestall its spread to this country.

== Labor practices ==
In 2013, the U.S. Department of Labor's report on the worst forms of child labor estimated that working children aged 5 to 14 represented 8.3% of Belize's population which corresponds to around 7,000 children engaged in child labor, especially in the agricultural sector. Harvesting bananas is one of the activities mentioned in the DOL report. Belize was once again classified as one of the 74 countries with significant incidence of child labor in a 2014 List of Goods Produced by Child Labor or Forced Labor published by the Bureau of International Labor Affairs.

The U.S. Department of Labor added that "important gaps remain in the country's legal framework on the worst forms of child labor [...] and the impact of many of the Government's development and education policies and programs on child labor remains unknown."
