= Mayflower Bocawina National Park =

National park in Belize

Coordinates: 16.932490°N 88.382909°W

The Mayflower Bocawina National Park is a national park in Belize that was established in 2001. This national park boasts a vast quantity of flora and fauna. The Mayflower Bocawina National Park is managed by the Friends of Mayflower Bocawina National Park and is listed as Category 2 on the IUCN list.

== Location ==
It is located on mile six on the Southern Highway, Stann-Creek District, and covers an estimated 7,000 acres of dense tropical forest.

== Sightings ==
Up to date, 3 Maya temples have been discovered and a visitor center has been constructed. The Maya Center is located on the road opposite the visitor center. Maintzunun and T'au Witz are located a short distance away from the visitor center.

== Species ==
Since its establishment as a national park, an estimated 238 species of birds have been identified. Some species include the motmot, parrot and toucan. Other than birds there is also wildlife present such as anteater, howler monkey, jaguars and tapirs.

Three waterfalls are also located within the parks 7,000 acres. Bocawina and Three Sisters falls are in close proximity to each other and are accessible by hiking around the mountain area. Antelope Falls, on the other hand, is a more difficult hike up during the rainy season. Due to the fact that Antelope Falls is close to the Mayan city, it is believed that the fall held significant importance to the city's survival.
