= Coins of the Belize dollar =

Coin

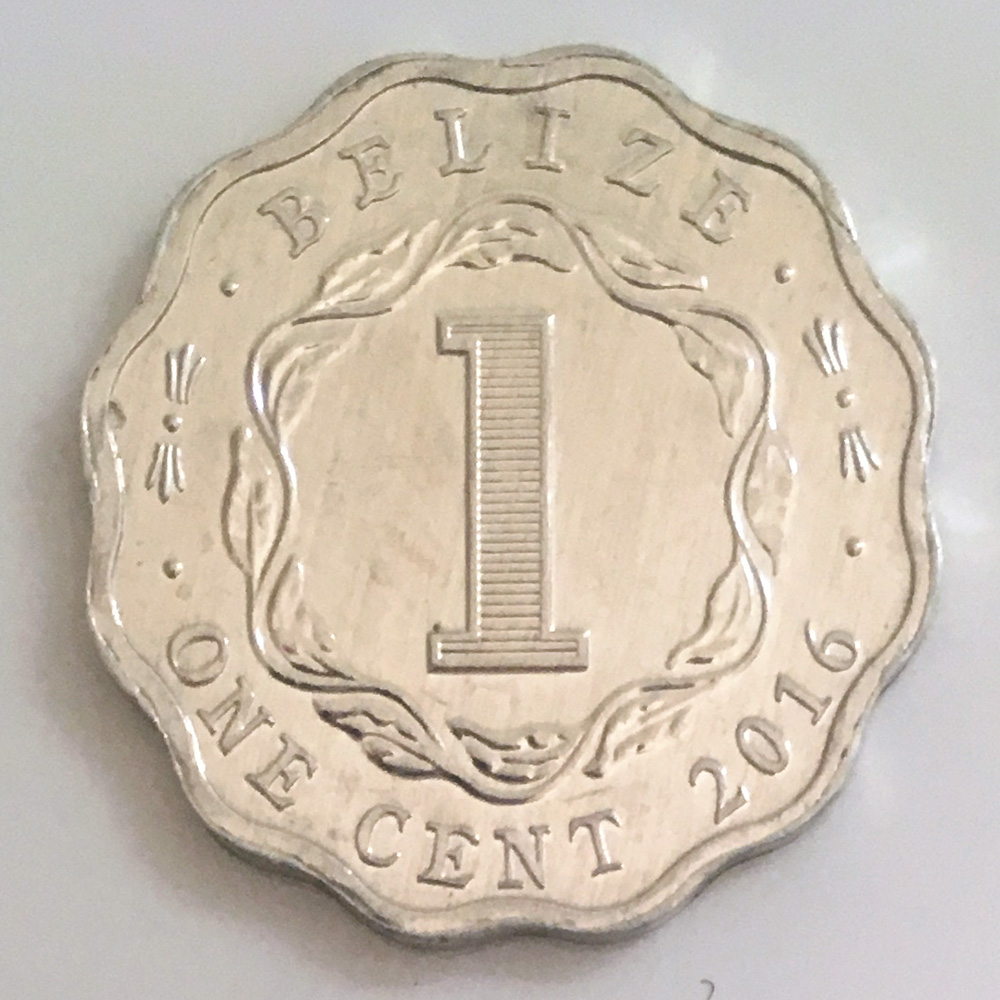
The Belize one-cent coin has a wavy edge that distinguishes it from the five-cent coin.

On June 1, 1973, the British colony of British Honduras changed its name to Belize, but its status remained unchanged until 1981, when Belize was granted independence.

== Coins of the Colony of Belize (1973–80) ==
The coins of the Colony of Belize retain the same basic designs as on the coins of British Honduras, but with the country's name changed to "Belize". These coins were struck at the Royal Mint, Llantrisant. A series of numismatic coins, depicting the Belizean Coat-of-Arms on the obverse instead of the Queen's portrait, were struck at the Franklin Mint. These coins were generally intended for American collectors, however, and did not circulate in Belize.

== Coins of Belize (1981–present) ==
The coins of the 1981 issue are regarded by collectors as being the first official coins of Belize. Most coins since independence have been struck at the Royal Mint, and still bear the British Honduras-style coin designs. Queen Elizabeth II, Belize's first head of state, is featured on Belizean coins facing right and wearing the heraldic Tudor Crown. Two types of the effigy of the Queen were used, one by Cecil Thomas for coins of 1-50 cents and one by Raphael Maklouf for the dollar coin.

=== Post independence coins ===
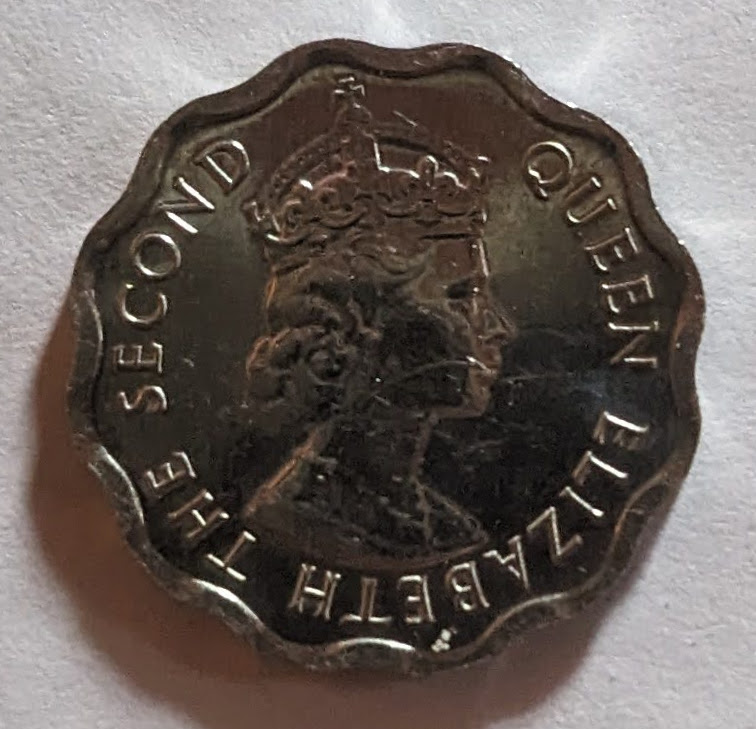
Belize 1 Cent Coin - Obverse

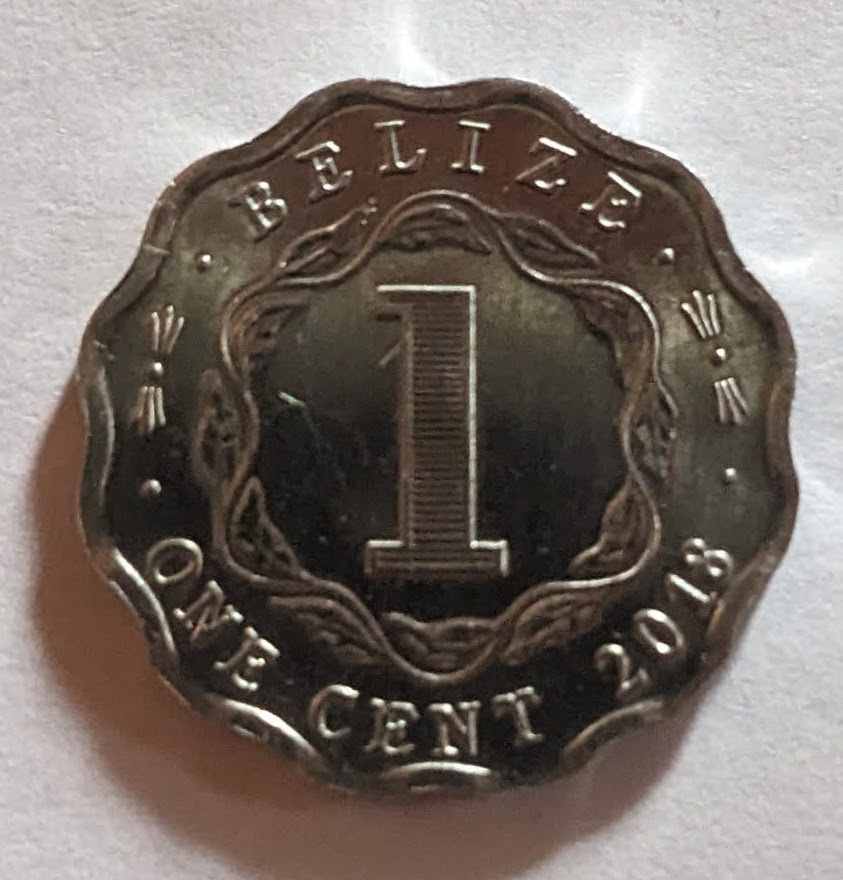
Belize 1 Cent Coin - Reverse

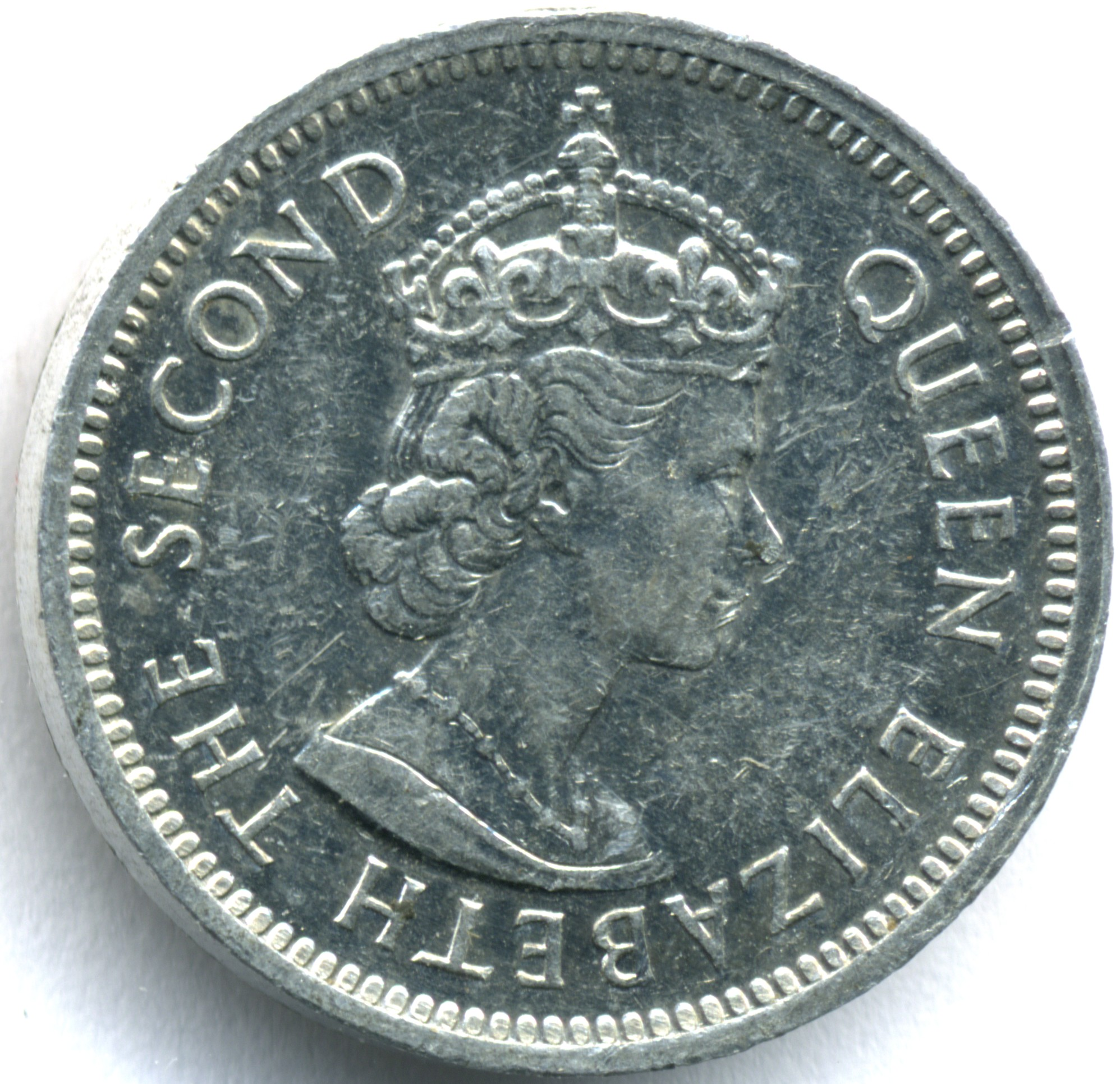
Five-cent coin obverse, though similar in size the shape distinguishes it from the one cent coin

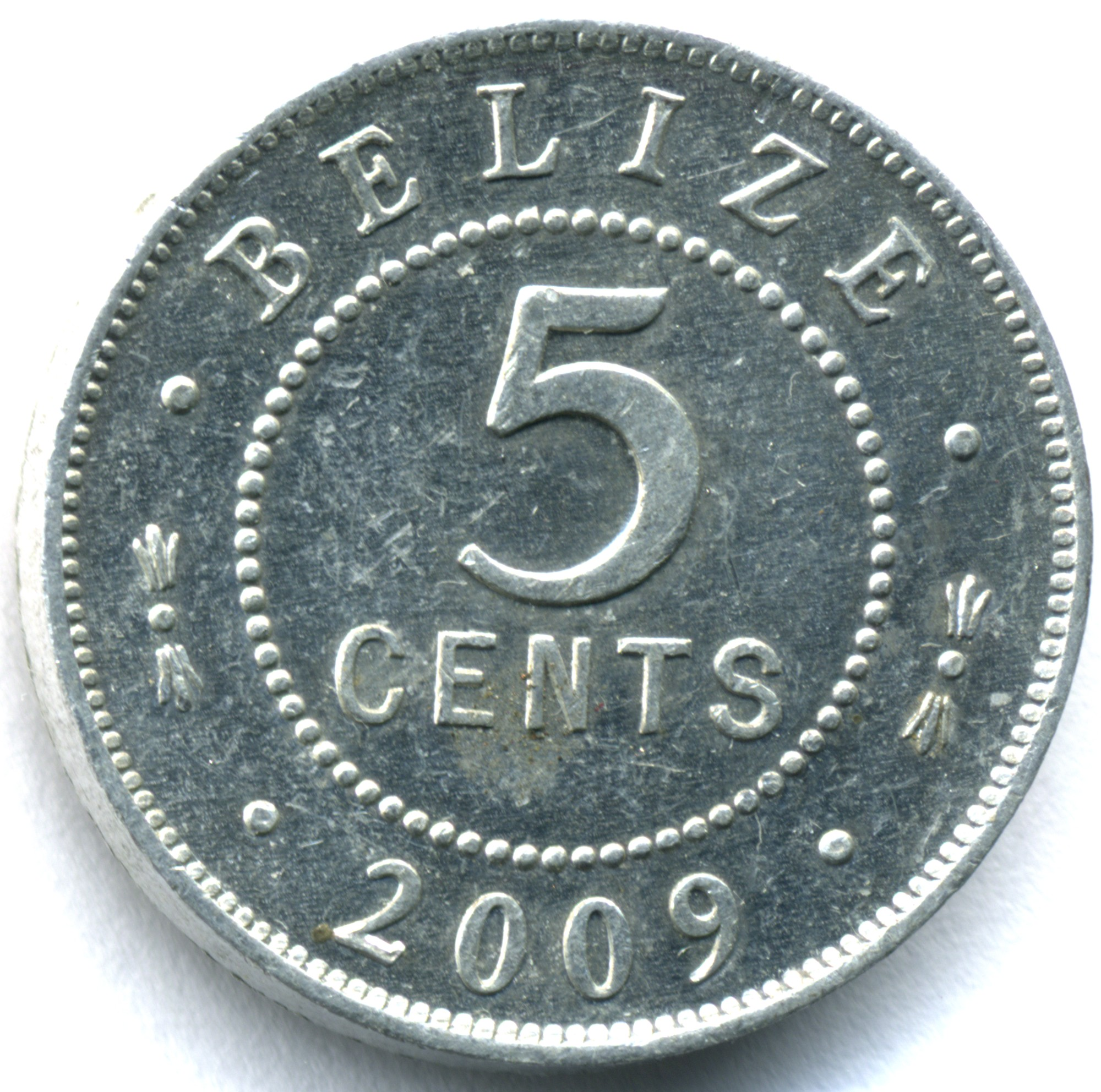
Five-cent coin reverse, made of aluminum

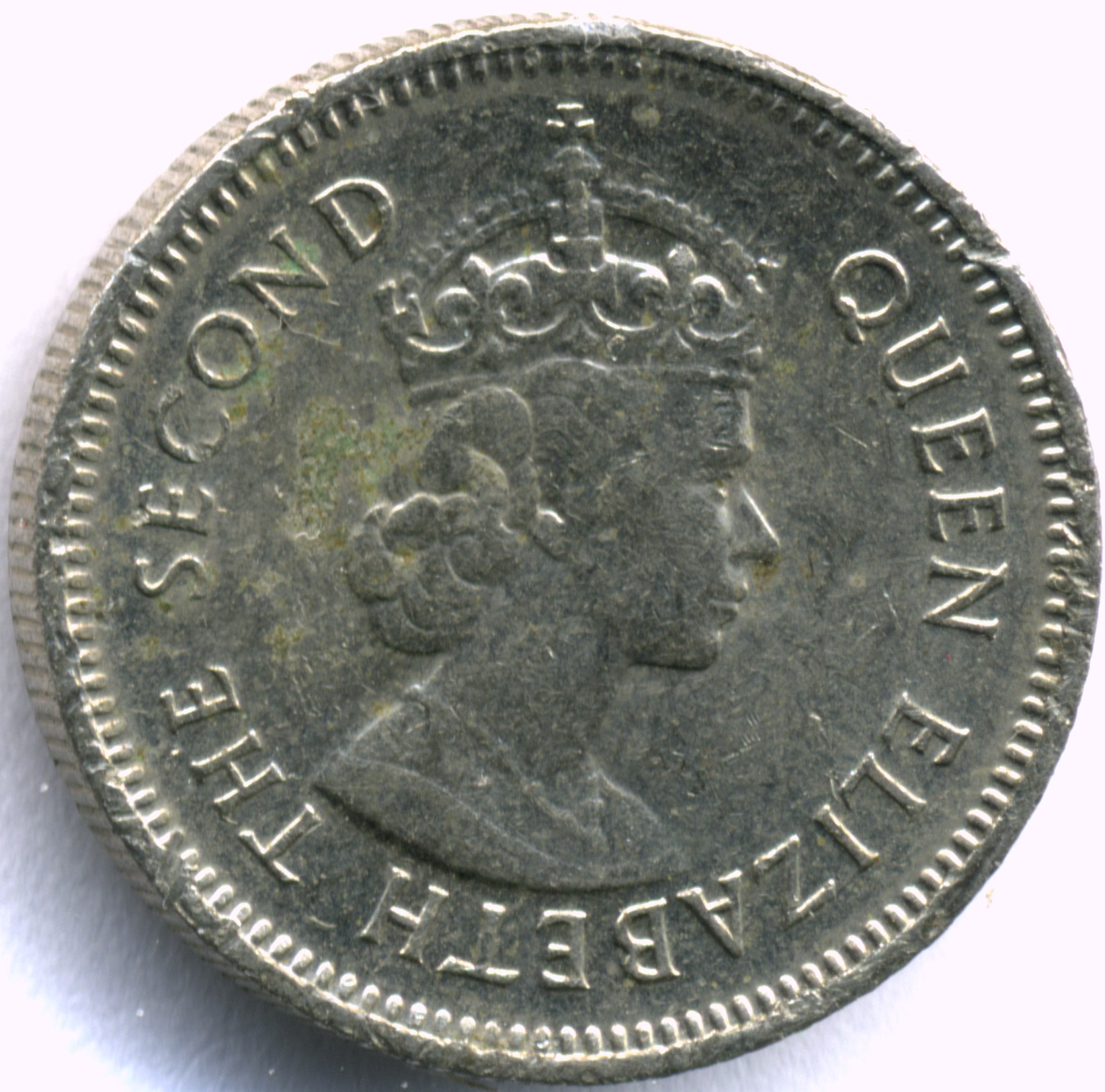
Ten-cent coin obverse, smaller size and reeded edge distinguishes it from the five cent coin

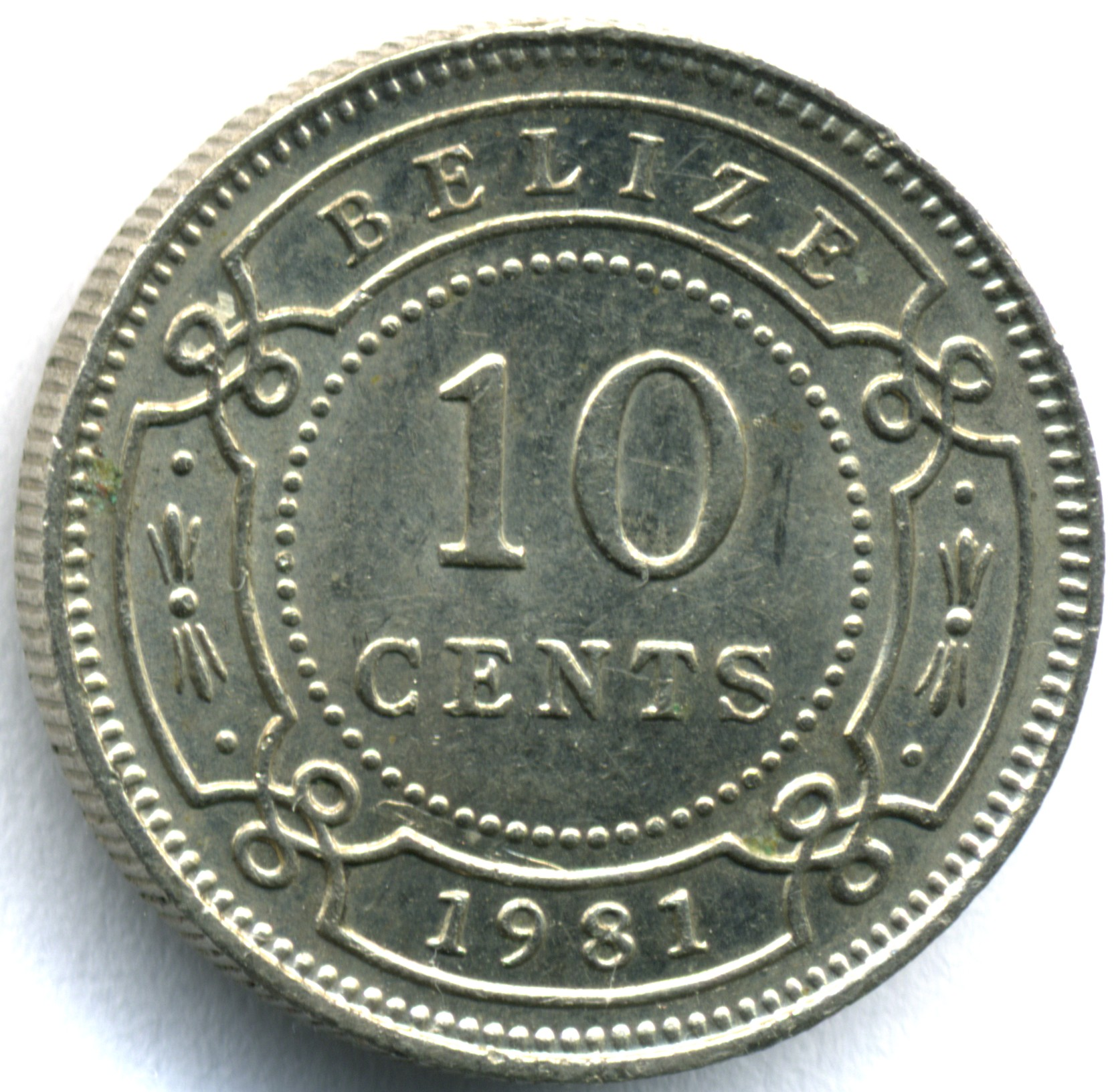
Ten-cent coin reverse

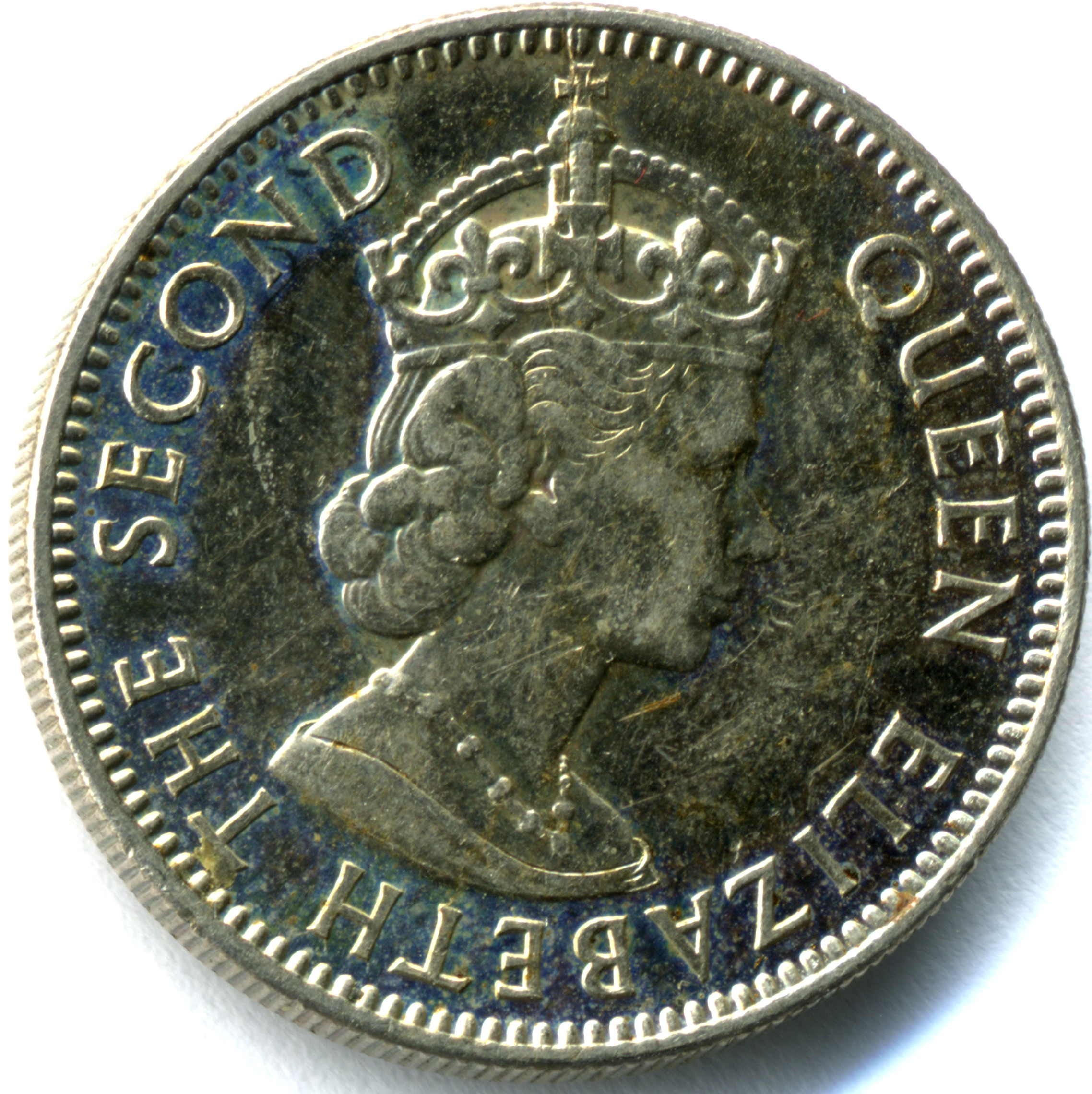
Twenty-five-cent coin obverse, larger size distinguishes this coin from the ten cent coin

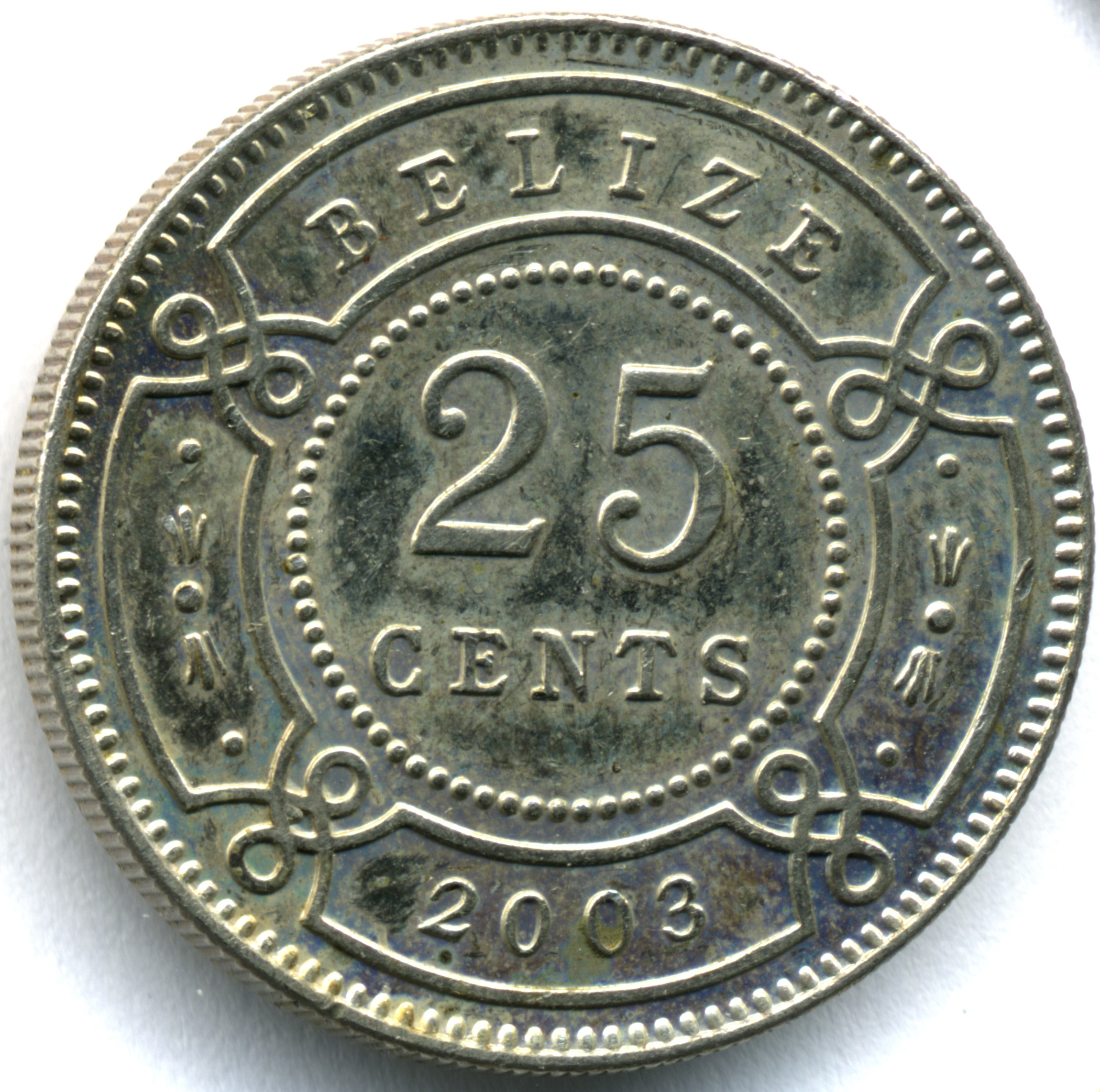
Twenty-five-cent coin reverse

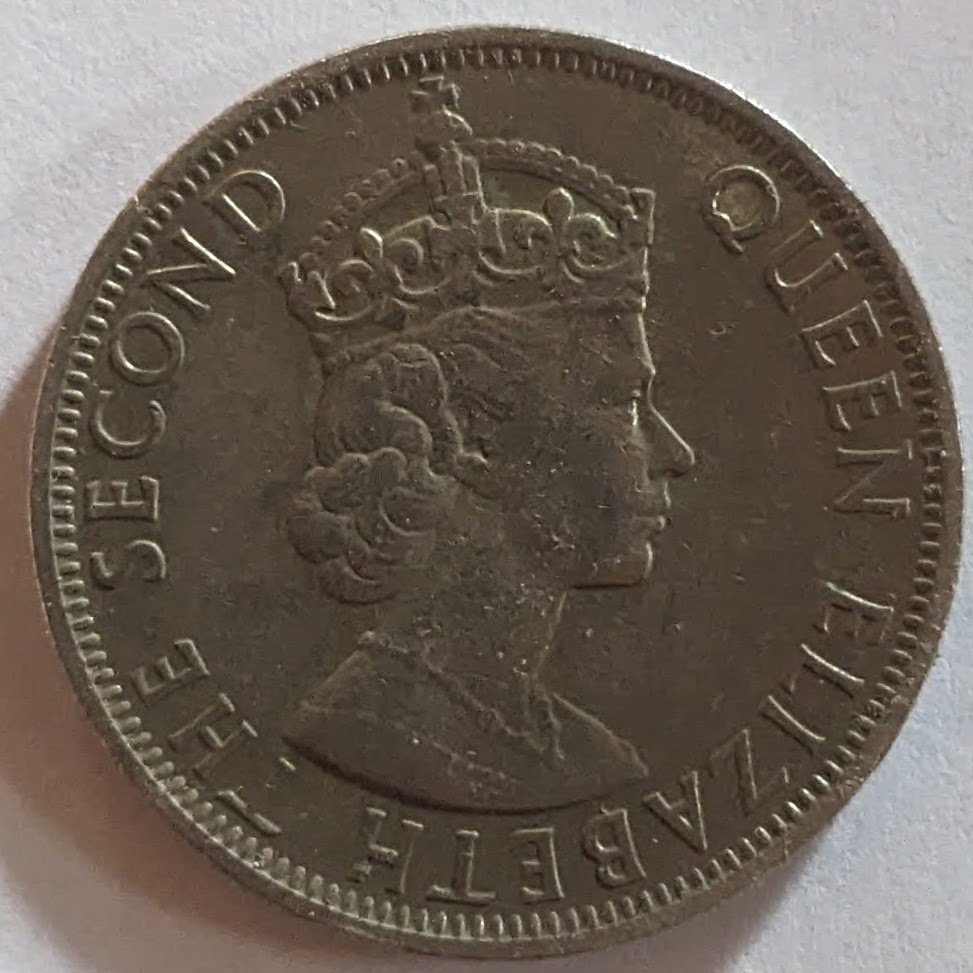
Belize 50 Cent Coin - Reverse

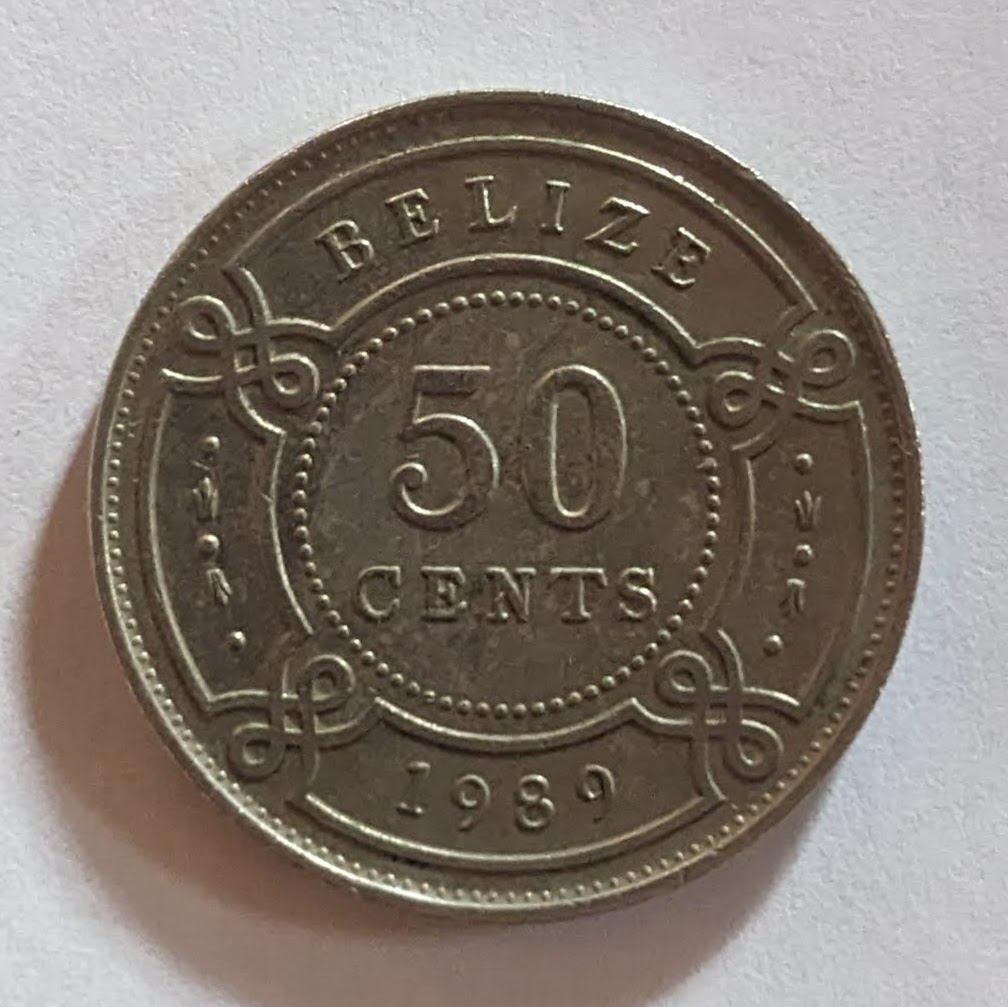
Belize 50 Cent Coin - Reverse

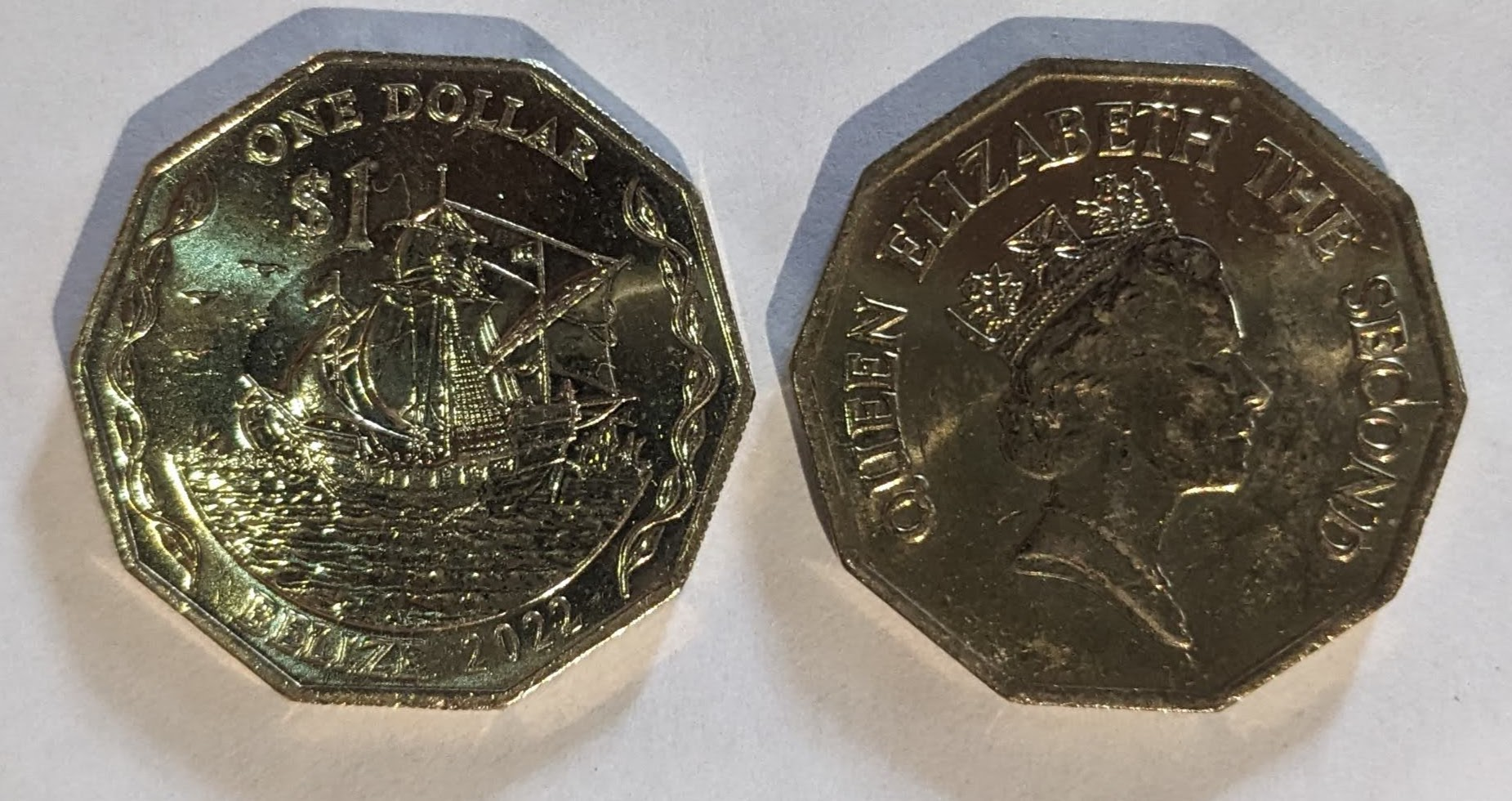
Belize 1 Dollar Coin

== Gallery ==
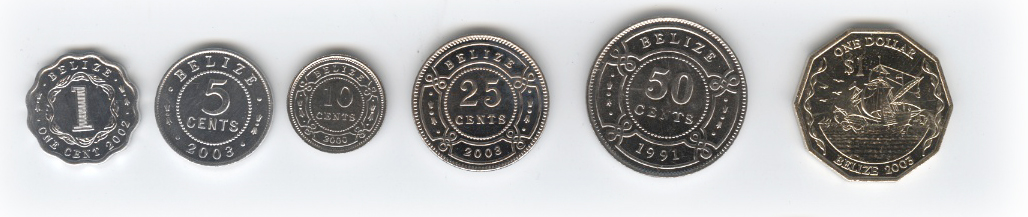
Reverse of modern Belize coins

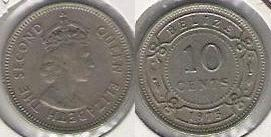
1975 10-cent coin

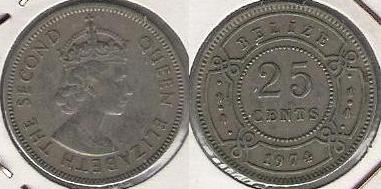
1974 25-cent coin

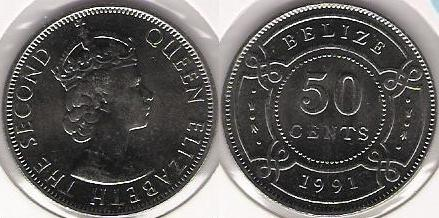
1991 50-cent coin. As seen here, coins have not drastically changed since Belize's independence in 1981.

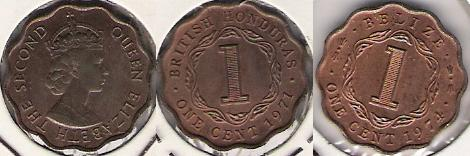
Comparison of British Honduras and Belize one-cent coins. Both types of coins share the same obverse and a very similar reverse

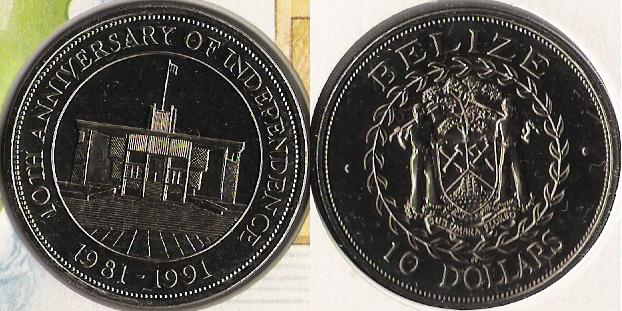
Commemorative 1991 ten-dollar coin celebrating the tenth anniversary of independence.
