= The Amazing Race Australia 6 =

Season of television series

- Season 6
- Presented by: Beau Ryan; Scott Tweedie
- No. of teams: 20
- Winners: Heath Curry & Toni Hilland
- No. of legs: 21
- Distance traveled: 55,000 km (34,000 mi)
- No. of episodes: 21

Release
- Original network: Network 10
- Original release: 29 August – 9 October 2022

Additional information
- Filming dates: 5 March – 16 April 2022

Series chronology
- ← Previous; Season 5 Next → Celebrity Edition

The Amazing Race Australia 6 (also promoted as The Amazing Race: Around the World) is the sixth season of The Amazing Race Australia, an Australian reality competition show based on the American series The Amazing Race and the third instalment of Network 10's iteration of the show. The season featured the largest cast in Amazing Race History with twenty teams of two, each with a pre-existing relationship, in a race around the world to win the grand prize of A$250,000 and two new cars (an Isuzu D-MAX and an Isuzu MU-X). Beau Ryan returned as the regular host, with presenter Scott Tweedie guest hosting for episodes 8–11 after Ryan caught COVID-19 during filming.

After the previous season was set in Australia due to the COVID-19 pandemic, this season returned to the standard travel format, visited six continents and seven countries and travelled over 55,000 kilometres (34,000 mi) during twenty-one legs. Starting in Melbourne and Sydney, racers travelled through Morocco, Greece, Turkey, Colombia, Belize, Mexico before returning to Australia, travelling through Western Australia and finishing in Broome. New twists introduced in this season include a split-city start, a no-switch Detour and an elimination during a no-rest leg. The season premiered on 29 August 2022, with the finale airing on 9 October 2022.

Married couple Heath Curry & Toni Hilland were the winners of this season, while church friends Angel Williams and Frankie Vaaua finished in second place and newlywed teachers Kelly and Georgia Baildon finished in third place.

== Production ==
=== Development and filming ===
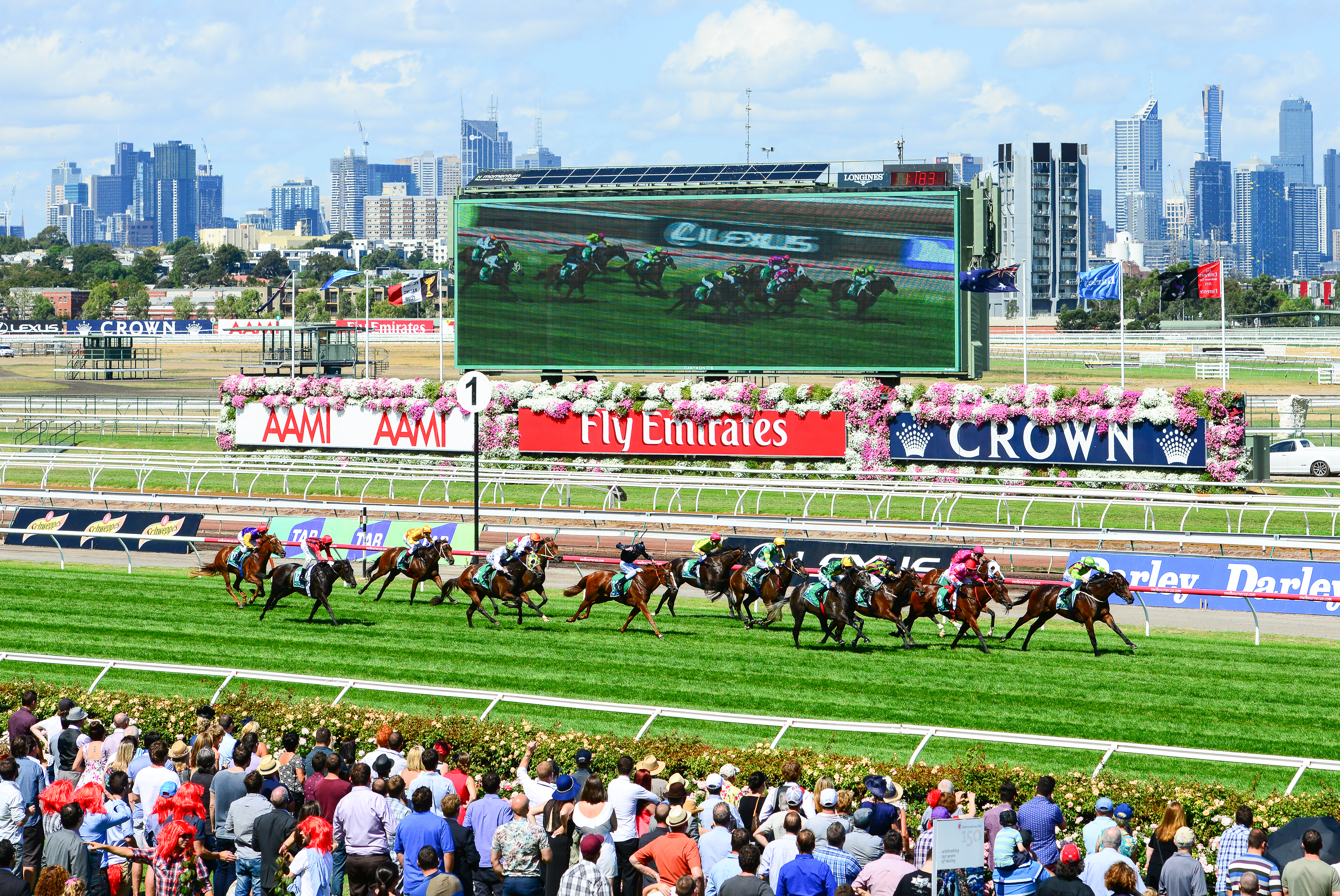
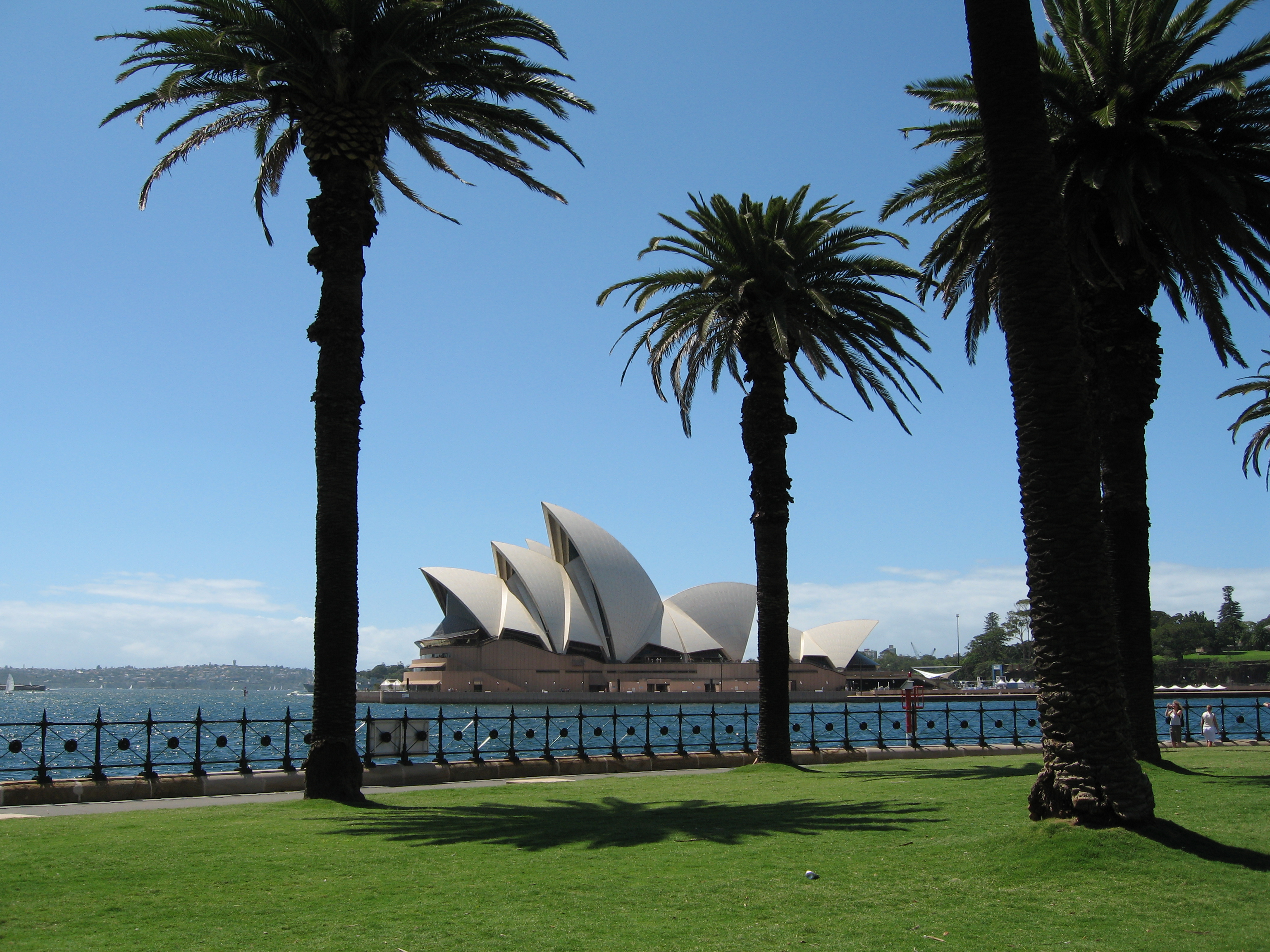
Both the Flemington Racecourse in Melbourne and Hickson Road Reserve across from the Sydney Opera House served as starting lines of The Amazing Race Australia 6.

On 20 October 2021, Network 10 announced at upfronts that a new season was set to air in the second half of 2022.

Unlike the previous season, which filmed solely in Australia due to COVID-19 restrictions, Beverley McGarvey, Executive Vice President and Chief Content Officer of Paramount Global Australia and New Zealand, stated that she intended for the show to resume travelling internationally again after the American version resumed international travel for their 33rd season in September 2021. On 2 February 2022, Daniel Monaghan, 10's Head of Programming, reaffirmed that the show would still be filming internationally as the Omicron surge began to subside.

Filming for the season began in March 2022. This season introduced a new twist involving two groups of ten teams starting The Amazing Race Australia separately, one in Sydney and one in Melbourne, each oblivious to the existence of the other, and racing separately before converging in the next leg. This twist has been used on several seasons of the Israeli edition of the Race. On 5 March 2022, Beau Ryan was spotted in Chefchaouen, Morocco. On 20 March, TV Blackbox reported that a few crew members had tested positive for COVID-19 requiring some of the crew, including Ryan, to self-isolate in hotels while the rest of the crew continued filming. From the eighth to eleventh legs, Scott Tweedie was brought in to temporarily replace Ryan as host. According to TV Tonight, Tweedie was contacted prior to the season to potentially step in as host as part of the production's COVID-safe contingency plan. The show then travelled to İzmir and Alaçatı. Filming wrapped in April 2022. In addition to Morocco, this season included first-time visits to Greece, Colombia, Belize and Mexico.

The Speed Bump, which was not in the previous season, was brought back into this season for teams that returned after self-isolating due to COVID-19.

=== Casting ===
Casting for the season began in early November 2021. Contestants were required to be fully vaccinated with filming expected to occur from February 2022 over four to seven weeks.

=== Marketing ===
Isuzu, UBank, Kathmandu and Merrell served as sponsors for this season.

== Cast ==
The cast was revealed on 22 August 2022.

| Contestants | Age | Subtitle | Hometown | Status |
|---|---|---|---|---|
| Paul Farrell | 67 | Dad & Daughter Brokers | Phillip Island, Victoria | Eliminated 1st (in Ksar Aït Benhaddou, Morocco) |
| Rachel Farrell | 33 | Dad & Daughter Brokers | Phillip Island, Victoria | Eliminated 1st (in Ksar Aït Benhaddou, Morocco) |
| Bren Wilkinson | 56 | Vegan Warriors | Western Australia | Eliminated 2nd (in Marrakesh, Morocco) |
| Anja Gramueller-Southon | 53 | Vegan Warriors | Western Australia | Eliminated 2nd (in Marrakesh, Morocco) |
| Jake O'Brien | 29 | Model Couple | Sydney, New South Wales | Eliminated 3rd (in Chefchaouen, Morocco) |
| Holly MacAlpine | 24 | Model Couple | Sydney, New South Wales | Eliminated 3rd (in Chefchaouen, Morocco) |
| Sam Trenwith | 27 | Flamboyant Friends | Adelaide, South Australia | Eliminated 4th (in Athens, Greece) |
| Alex Hill | 28 | Flamboyant Friends | Adelaide, South Australia | Eliminated 4th (in Athens, Greece) |
| Sam Kimberley | 23 | The Mullets | Perth, Western Australia | Eliminated 5th (in Arachova, Greece) |
| Stu Moorhouse | 23 | The Mullets | Perth, Western Australia | Eliminated 5th (in Arachova, Greece) |
| Crystal Tawil | 27 | Middle Eastern Mates | New South Wales | Eliminated 6th (in İzmir, Turkey) |
| Reem Chokr | 26 | Middle Eastern Mates | New South Wales | Eliminated 6th (in İzmir, Turkey) |
| Tammy Chan | 42 | Scientific Siblings | Victoria | Eliminated 7th (in Kula, Turkey) |
| Vincent Chan | 40 | Scientific Siblings | Queensland | Eliminated 7th (in Kula, Turkey) |
| Morgan Trevethan | 23 | Blonde Buddies | Gold Coast, Queensland | Eliminated 8th (in Alaçatı, Turkey) |
| Lilli Robbo | 23 | Blonde Buddies | Gold Coast, Queensland | Eliminated 8th (in Alaçatı, Turkey) |
| Kathy Alexandra | 28 | Lawyer Cousins | Sydney, New South Wales | Eliminated 9th (in Bogotá, Colombia) |
| Chace Tran | 27 | Lawyer Cousins | Sydney, New South Wales | Eliminated 9th (in Bogotá, Colombia) |
| Stuart McGrath | 31 | Baru Mates | Tiwi Islands, Northern Territory | Eliminated 10th (in Cartagena, Colombia) |
| Glennon Babui | 23 | Baru Mates | Elcho Island, Northern Territory | Eliminated 10th (in Cartagena, Colombia) |
| Felicity "Flick" Mifsud | 28 | Barista Sisters | Melbourne | Eliminated 11th (in Belize City, Belize) |
| Gabby Mifsud | 24 | Barista Sisters | Melbourne | Eliminated 11th (in Belize City, Belize) |
| Felicity "Fliss" Naughton | 20 | Country Kids | Crookwell, New South Wales | Medically removed (in San Ignacio, Belize) |
| Josephine "Tottie" O'Brienn | 20 | Country Kids | Crookwell, New South Wales | Medically removed (in San Ignacio, Belize) |
| Jodie Playford | 55 | Dragon Boat Mums | New South Wales | Eliminated 13th (in Caye Caulker, Belize) |
| Claire Thomas | 48 | Dragon Boat Mums | New South Wales | Eliminated 13th (in Caye Caulker, Belize) |
| Chelsea Keen | 26 | Engaged Parents | Queensland | Eliminated 14th (in Mérida, Mexico) |
| Jamus Maoate | 35 | Engaged Parents | Queensland | Eliminated 14th (in Mérida, Mexico) |
| Lauren Howells | 27 | Cop Couple | Western Australia | Eliminated 15th (in Ekʼ Balam, Mexico) |
| Steph McGrath | 34 | Cop Couple | Western Australia | Eliminated 15th (in Ekʼ Balam, Mexico) |
| Pako Komira | 38 | Hubbies | Sydney, New South Wales | Eliminated 16th (in Perth, Australia) |
| Mori Perez | 39 | Hubbies | Sydney, New South Wales | Eliminated 16th (in Perth, Australia) |
| Tiffany Turland | 36 | Aunty & Niece | Pilbara, Western Australia | Eliminated 17th (in Fremantle, Australia) |
| Cynthia Cameron-Turland | 21 | Aunty & Niece | Pilbara, Western Australia | Eliminated 17th (in Fremantle, Australia) |
| Kelly Baildon | 25 | Newlywed Teachers | Brisbane, Queensland | Third place |
| Georgia Baildon | 25 | Newlywed Teachers | Brisbane, Queensland | Third place |
| Angel Williams | 24 | Church Friends | Brisbane, Queensland | Runners-up |
| Frankie Vaaua | 25 | Church Friends | Gold Coast, Queensland | Runners-up |
| Heath Curry | 33 | Enduring Love | Melbourne | Winners |
| Toni Hilland | 38 | Enduring Love | Melbourne | Winners |

Future appearances

In 2023, Jake O'Brien and Holly MacAlpine appeared on the sixth season of MTV's Ex on the Beach. In 2024, O'Brien appeared on the second season of FBoy Island Australia.

== Results ==
The following teams are listed with their placements in each leg. Placements are listed in finishing order.

- A red placement with a dagger (†) indicates that the team was eliminated.
- An underlined blue placement with a double-dagger (‡) indicates that the team was the last to arrive at a Pit Stop in a non-elimination leg.
- An italicized and underlined placement indicates that the team was the last to arrive at a Pit Stop, but there was no rest period at the Pit Stop and all teams were instructed to continue racing.
- A brown ⊃ indicates that the team used the U-Turn and a brown ⊂ indicates the team on the receiving end of the U-Turn.

Team placement (by leg)
| Team | 1 (Note: The 20 teams were split into two groups. Ten of the teams left from Melbourne and completed leg 1 in Ouarzazate, Morocco, while the other ten teams left from Sydney and completed leg 2 in Marrakesh. The eighteen remaining teams converged in Chefchaouen to begin the third leg.) | 2 | 3 | 4 | 5 | 6 | 7 | 8 | 9 |
|---|---|---|---|---|---|---|---|---|---|
| Heath & Toni | | 5th | 14th | 11th | 1st | 4th | 10th | 2nd | 5th |
| Angel & Frankie | | 1st | 9th | 1st | 9th | 3rd | 1st | 1st | 1st |
| Kelly & Georgia | 1st | | 5th | 10th | 5th | 6th | 11th | 8th | 8th |
| Tiffany & Cynthia | 4th | | 15th | 6th | 15th‡ | 9th | 3rd | 10th | 7th |
| Pako & Mori | 2nd | | 2nd | 4th | 2nd | 1st | 2nd | 4th | 10th |
| Lauren & Steph | | 3rd | 8th | 2nd | 11th | 2nd | 8th | 7th | 3rd |
| Chelsea & Jamus | 9th | | 6th | 8th | 6th | 5th | 6th | 11th (Note: Chelsea & Jamus initially arrived 4th, but they could not check in at the Pit Stop because they did not have their backpacks. They had to go back to retrieve them before being allowed to check-in. Seven teams checked in during this time, dropping Chelsea & Jamus to 11th.) | 6th |
| Jodie & Claire | 6th | | 17th | 9th | 8th | 11th | 12th | 9th | 4th |
| Fliss & Tottie | 8th | | 7th | 12th | 4th | 10th | 9th | 6th | 9th |
| Flick & Gabby | 3rd | | 1st | 3rd | 3rd | 7th | 5th | 3rd | 2nd |
| Stuart & Glennon | | 8th | 10th | 7th | 13th | 14th | Removed from competition (Note: This team was temporarily removed from the competition due to COVID-19 and were subject to a Speed Bump when they returned.) | | |
| Kathy & Chace | | 2nd | 3rd | Removed from competition | | | | | |
| Morgan & Lilli | | 9th | 11th | 13th | 12th | 8th | 4th | 5th | 11th† |
| Tammy & Vincent | 5th | | 4th | 15th | 7th | 13th | 7th | 12th† | |
| Crystal & Reem | | 4th | 16th | 5th | 14th | 12th | 13th† | | |
| Sam & Stu | | 7th | 12th | 14th | 10th | 15th† | | | |
| Sam & Alex | | 6th | 13th | 16th† | | | | | |
| Jake & Holly | 7th | | 18th† (Note: Jake & Holly initially arrived 1st, but were issued a 30-minute penalty for refusing to complete the dance challenge. All of the other teams checked in during this penalty time, dropping Jake & Holly to last.) | | | | | | |
| Bren & Anja | | 10th† | | | | | | | |
| Paul & Rachel | 10th† | | | | | | | | |

Team placement (by leg)
| Team | 10 | 11 | 12 | 13 | 14 | 15 | 16 | 17 | 18 | 19 | 20 | 21 |
|---|---|---|---|---|---|---|---|---|---|---|---|---|
| Heath & Toni | 5th | 6th‡ | 2nd | 2nd | 1st | 1st | 2nd | 2nd⊃ (Note: Heath & Toni chose to use the U-Turn on Tiffany & Cynthia.) | 1st | 1st | 3rd | 1st |
| Angel & Frankie | 1st | 2nd | 3rd (Note: Angel & Frankie initially arrived 2nd, but did not walk through the marked tunnel to the Pit Stop as had been indicated in the clue. They were required to go back and walk through the marked tunnel. Heath & Toni checked in while they went back, dropping Angel & Frankie to 3rd.) | 4th | 3rd | 3rd | 3rd | 3rd | 4th | 4th | 2nd | 2nd |
| Kelly & Georgia | Removed from competition | | | | 5th | 5th | 5th (Note: Kelly & Georgia initially arrived 4th, but were issued a 10-minute penalty for quitting the piñata task. Tiffany & Cynthia checked-in during this penalty time, dropping Kelly & Georgia to 5th.) | 1st | 5th | 3rd | 1st | 3rd |
| Tiffany & Cynthia | Removed from competition | | | | 6th | 4th | 4th | 6th⊂ | 3rd | 2nd | 4th† | |
| Pako & Mori | 4th | 1st | 1st | 3rd | 2nd | 2nd | 1st | 4th⊃ (Note: Pako & Mori chose to use the U-Turn on Lauren & Steph.) | 2nd | 5th† (Note: Pako & Mori initially arrived 4th at the Pit Stop but were issued a 15-minute penalty because they chose to quit the inverted hanging task at Optus Stadium. Angel & Frankie checked in during this penalty time, dropping Pako & Mori to last.) | | |
| Lauren & Steph | Removed from competition | | | | | 7th | 6th | 5th⊂ | 6th† | | | |
| Chelsea & Jamus | 3rd | 5th (Note: Chelsea & Jamus initially arrived 3rd, but were issued a 10-minute penalty for quitting the Brew Detour task. Two teams (Stuart & Glennon and Flick & Gabby) checked in during this penalty time, dropping Chelsea & Jamus to 5th.) | 5th | 1st | 4th | 6th | 7th (Note: This team arrived last at the Pit Stop, but they were instructed to continue racing.) | 7th† | | | | |
| Jodie & Claire | Removed from competition | | | | 7th (Note: Jodie & Claire arrived last at the Pit Stop but were not eliminated on account of Fliss & Tottie having been medically removed from the race.) | 8th† | | | | | | |
| Fliss & Tottie | Removed from competition | | | | † (Note: Fliss & Tottie were medically removed from the competition after Fliss sprained her ankle on the way to the Detour.) | | | | | | | |
| Flick & Gabby | 2nd | 4th | 4th | 5th† | | | | | | | | |
| Stuart & Glennon | 6th | 3rd (Note: Stuart & Glennon initially arrived 2nd, but were issued a 15-minute penalty for submitting another team's work at the Bunch Detour task. Angel & Frankie checked in during this penalty time, dropping Stuart & Glennon to 3rd.) | 6th† | | | | | | | | | |
| Kathy & Chace | 7th† | | | | | | | | | | | |

== Race summary ==
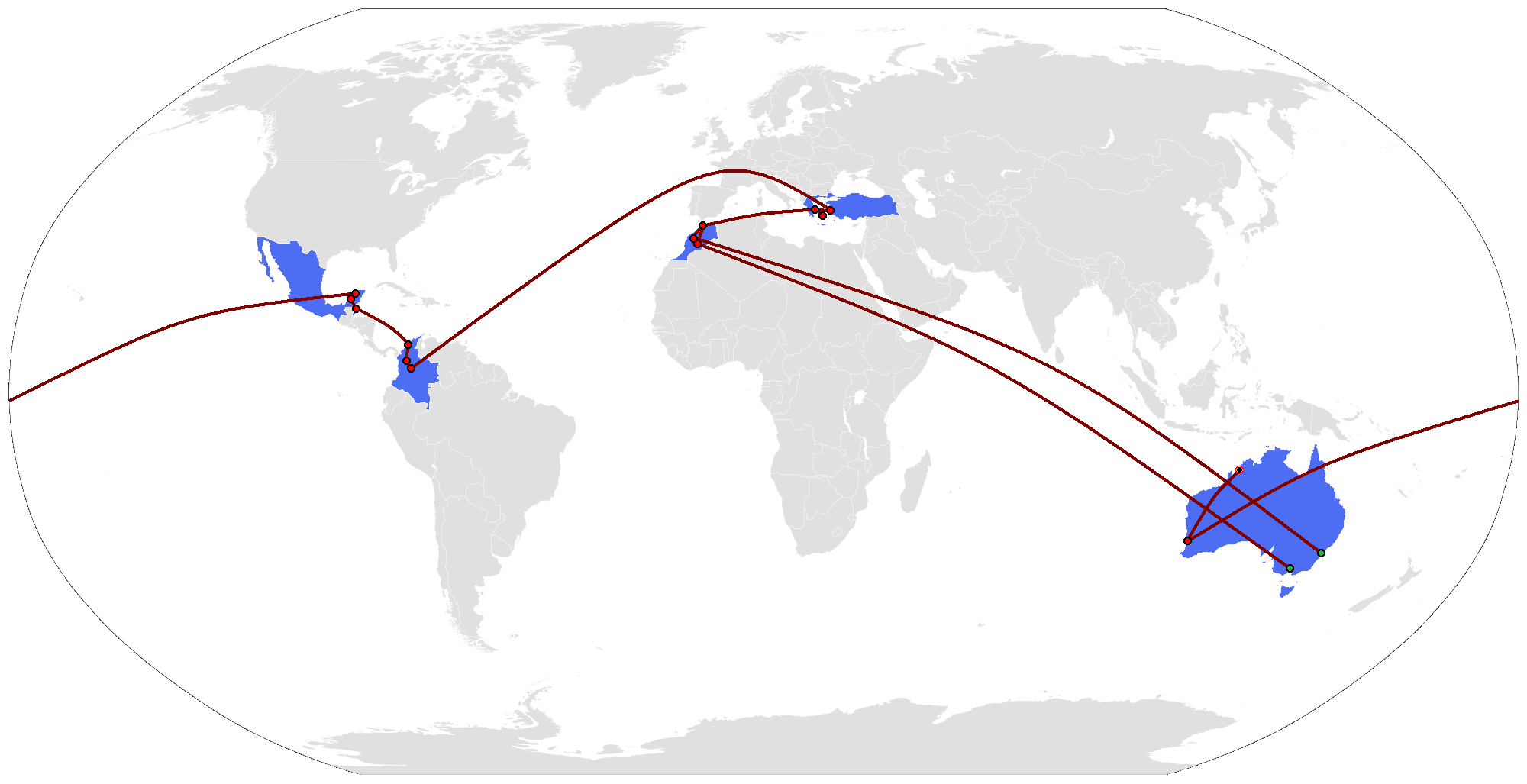
The complete route of The Amazing Race Australia 6.

| Destinations | Air travel Rail travel Water travel Bus travel Helicopter travel Bicycle travel Gondola travel |
| Route Markers | Detour Roadblock U-Turn Speed Bump Pit Stop |

=== Leg 1 (Australia → Morocco) ===
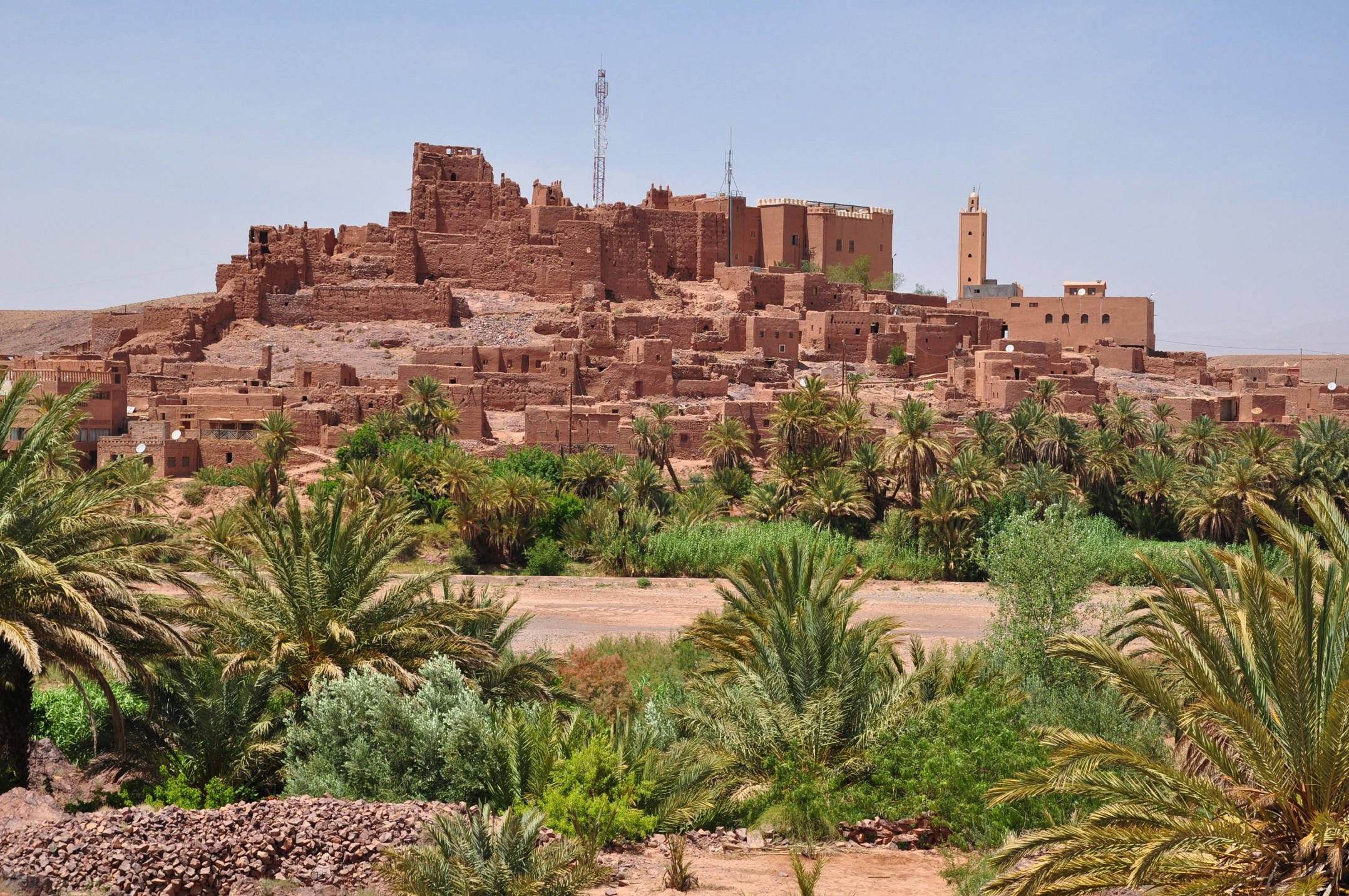
Teams encountered their first task in Morocco at the Kasbah of Tifoultoute.

- Episode 1 (29 August 2022)
- Prize: A holiday to the Mornington Peninsula (awarded to Kelly & Georgia)
- Eliminated: Paul & Rachel

Locations

- Melbourne (Flemington Racecourse) (1st Starting Line)
- Melbourne → Ouarzazate, Morocco
- Tifoultoute (Kasbah of Tifoultoute)
- Ouarzazate (Old Town)
- Ouarzazate (Atlas Studios)
- Ksar Aït Benhaddou (Riverbed)

Episode summary

- At the start of this leg, ten teams were instructed to fly to Ouarzazate, Morocco. Once there, teams had to travel to the Kasbah of Tifoultoute, where they had to identify five spices by taste to receive their next clue.
- This season's first Detour was a choice between In a Line or Off the Line. In In a Line, teams had to find a specific date vendor and order five dates from least expensive to most expensive to receive their next clue. In Off the Line, teams had to sort a pile of laundry by identifying five family name tags written in Arabic and then fold each set of clothing to receive their next clue.
- In this season's first Roadblock, one team member had to complete a series of challenges relating to the filming of The Mummy at Atlas Studios: mummifying themselves using bandages with assistance from their partner, walking on hot coals with a torch, carrying a spear across a balance beam and placing the spear on a statue, jumping through three fiery hoops and then smashing through a brick wall. Once they completed the stunt course within 45 seconds, they received their next clue. For safety reasons, racers had to start over if their bandages came off during the sequence.
- After the Roadblock, teams had to find the 16 sphinxes at Atlas Studios, identify the king using a riddle and then retrieve a rock below the king to receive their next clue, which directed teams to the Pit Stop: a riverbed at Ksar Aït Benhaddou.

=== Leg 2 (Australia → Morocco) ===
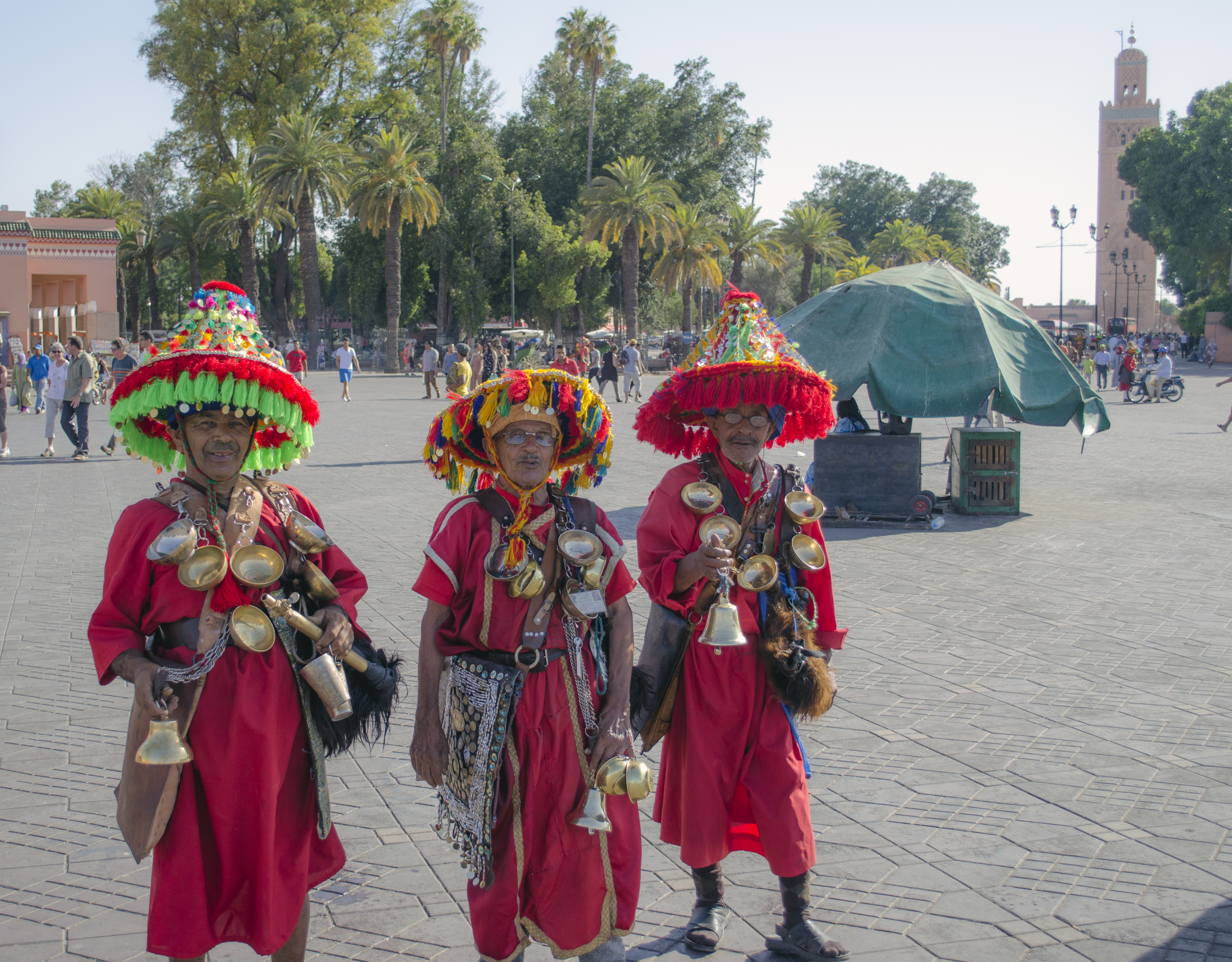
For one Detour option in Marrakesh, teams had to search Jemaa el-Fnaa for water sellers.

- Episode 2 (30 August 2022)
- Eliminated: Bren & Anja

Locations

- Sydney (Hickson Road Reserve) (2nd Starting Line)
- Sydney → Marrakesh, Morocco
- Marrakesh (Koutoubia Mosque)
- Marrakesh (Jemaa el-Fnaa or Souk Kharrazine El bali)
- Marrakesh (Hotel Cecil)
- Marrakesh (Souk Zitoun Place)
- Marrakesh (Dar Dbagh Lakbira Tannery)
- Marrakesh (Koutoubia Gardens)

Episode summary

- At the start of this leg, ten new teams who did not compete in the first leg were instructed to fly to Marrakesh, Morocco. Once there, teams had to travel to the Koutoubia Mosque, where they had to load a cart with forty clay pots and then transport them through the alleyways of the souk to a pottery shop to receive their next clue.
- This leg's Detour was a choice between Splash or Dash. In Splash, teams had to find six water sellers wearing red and yellow tassels and total the brass cups that they were wearing to receive their next clue. In Dash, teams had to find one of four lanterns flashing Morse code and translate the message – ENLIGHTENING – to receive their next clue.
- In this leg's Roadblock, teams first had to sign up for a departure time at the Hotel Cecil. Once at the Souk Zitoun Place, one team member had to eat three preserved lemons to receive their next clue.
- At the Dar Dbagh Lakbira tannery, teams had to scrape the hairs off of five goat hides and lay them out to dry to receive their next clue, which directed them to the Pit Stop: the Koutoubia Gardens.

=== Leg 3 (Morocco) ===
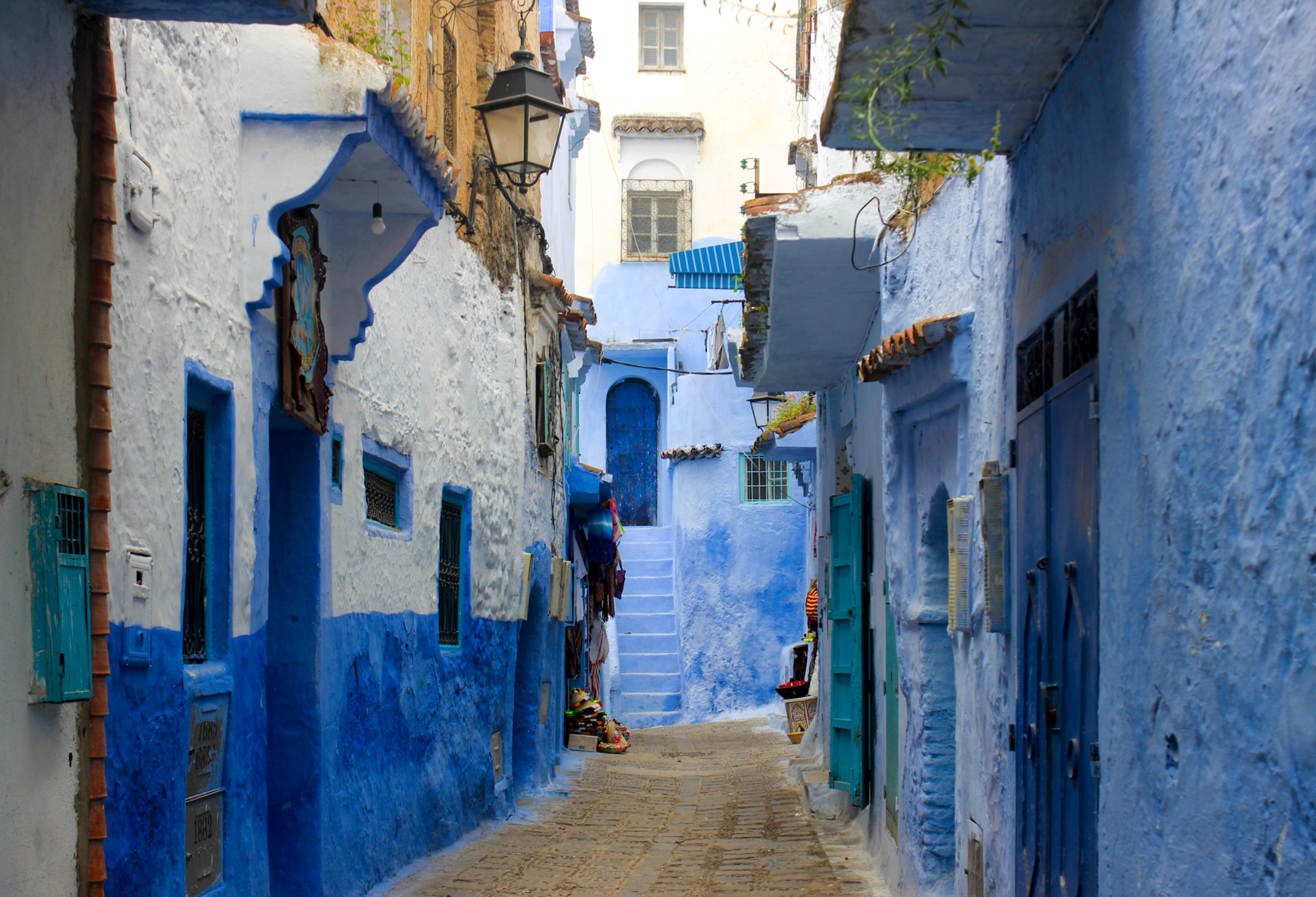
In Northern Morocco, teams explored the medina of Chefchaouen.

- Episode 3 (31 August 2022)
- Prizes: Two pairs of Samsung Galaxy S22 Ultras, Galaxy Watches and Galaxy Buds (awarded to Flick & Gabby)
- Eliminated: Jake & Holly

Locations

- Chefchaouen (Spanish Mosque)
- Chefchaouen (Plaza Uta el Hamman)
- Chefchaouen (La Botica de la Abuela Aladdin)
- Chefchaouen (Stairs)
- Chefchaouen (Place El Haouta)
- Chefchaouen (Restaurant Triana)

Episode summary

- At the start of this leg, both groups of racers from the first two legs met at the Spanish Mosque in Chefchaouen. Teams were then instructed to travel to the Plaza Uta el Hamman, where they had to join a group of Gnawa dancers and both team members had to use their heads to continuously twirl the tassel on a fez for 90 seconds to receive their next clue.
- In this leg's Roadblock, teams had to find La Botica de la Abuela Aladdin and choose a number. They entered the shop the next morning in groups of three, where one team member had two minutes to search for a stack of Moroccan black soaps marked with an Amazing Race flag; otherwise they had to go to the back of the queue before they could try again. After memorising the stack, they had to replicate it using the soaps outside to receive their next clue.
- After the Roadblock, teams had to use small paintbrushes to paint a step with blue colour wash to receive their next clue.
- At Place El Haouta, teams had to choose a book with pictures of doors, search the streets for three doors from their book and write down the street numbers to receive their next clue, which directed them to the Pit Stop: the Restaurant Triana.

Additional note

- Moroccan singer Dalal Barnoussi appeared as the Pit Stop greeter for this leg.

=== Leg 4 (Morocco → Greece) ===
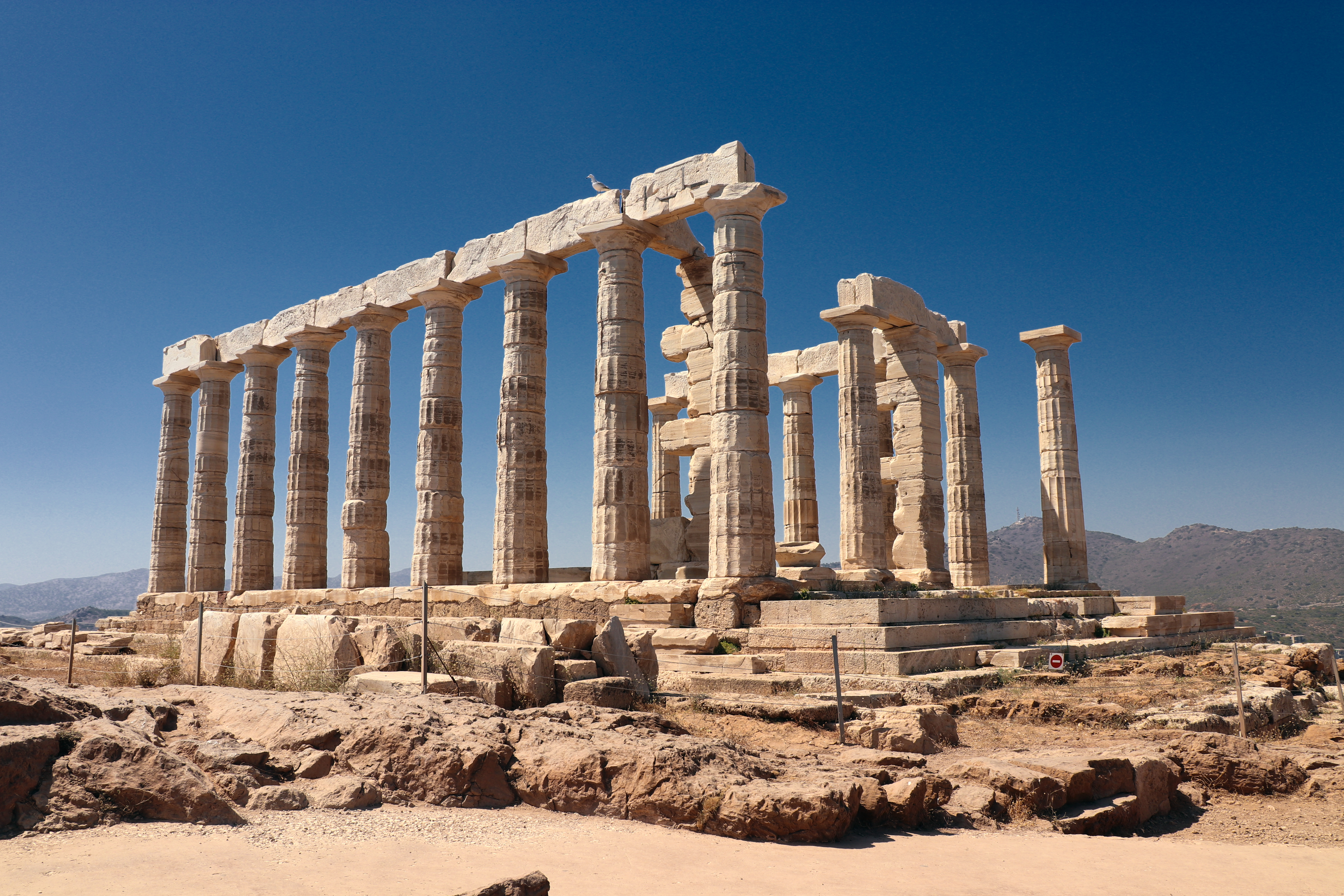
At the Temple of Poseidon, teams had to recite the fable of "The Tortoise and the Hare".

- Episode 4 (4 September 2022)
- Eliminated: Sam & Alex

Locations

- Chefchaouen (Place El Haouta – Chefchaouen Clock)
- Tangier → Athens, Greece
- Athens (Attica Grove Theatre)
- Cape Sounion (Temple of Poseidon)
- Athens (Technopolis)
- Athens (Taverna Platanos)
- Athens (Kotzia Square)

Episode summary

- At the start of this leg, teams were instructed to fly to Athens, Greece. Once there, teams departed from the airport in the order that they had arrived at the previous Pit Stop and had to travel to the Attica Grove Theatre. There, teams had to use a bow and arrow to hit the center of a target to receive their next clue.
- At the Temple of Poseidon, teams had to memorise and then recite in unison the story of "The Tortoise and the Hare", one of Aesop's fables, to receive their next clue from Poseidon.
- This leg's Detour was a choice between Step Up or Step Down. In Step Up, teams had to perform the changing of the guard routine of the Greek Presidential Guards to receive their next clue. In Step Down, teams had to make two pairs of classic Greek sandals and then complete a three-legged race to receive their next clue.
- At the Taverna Platanos, teams had to eat an entire serving of spanakopita by feeding each other half to receive their next clue, which directed them to the Pit Stop: Kotzia Square.

Additional notes

- Kathy & Chace were temporarily removed from the competition due to COVID-19.
- Mister Supranational Greece 2021 Spyros Nikolaidis appeared as the Pit Stop greeter for this leg.

=== Leg 5 (Greece) ===
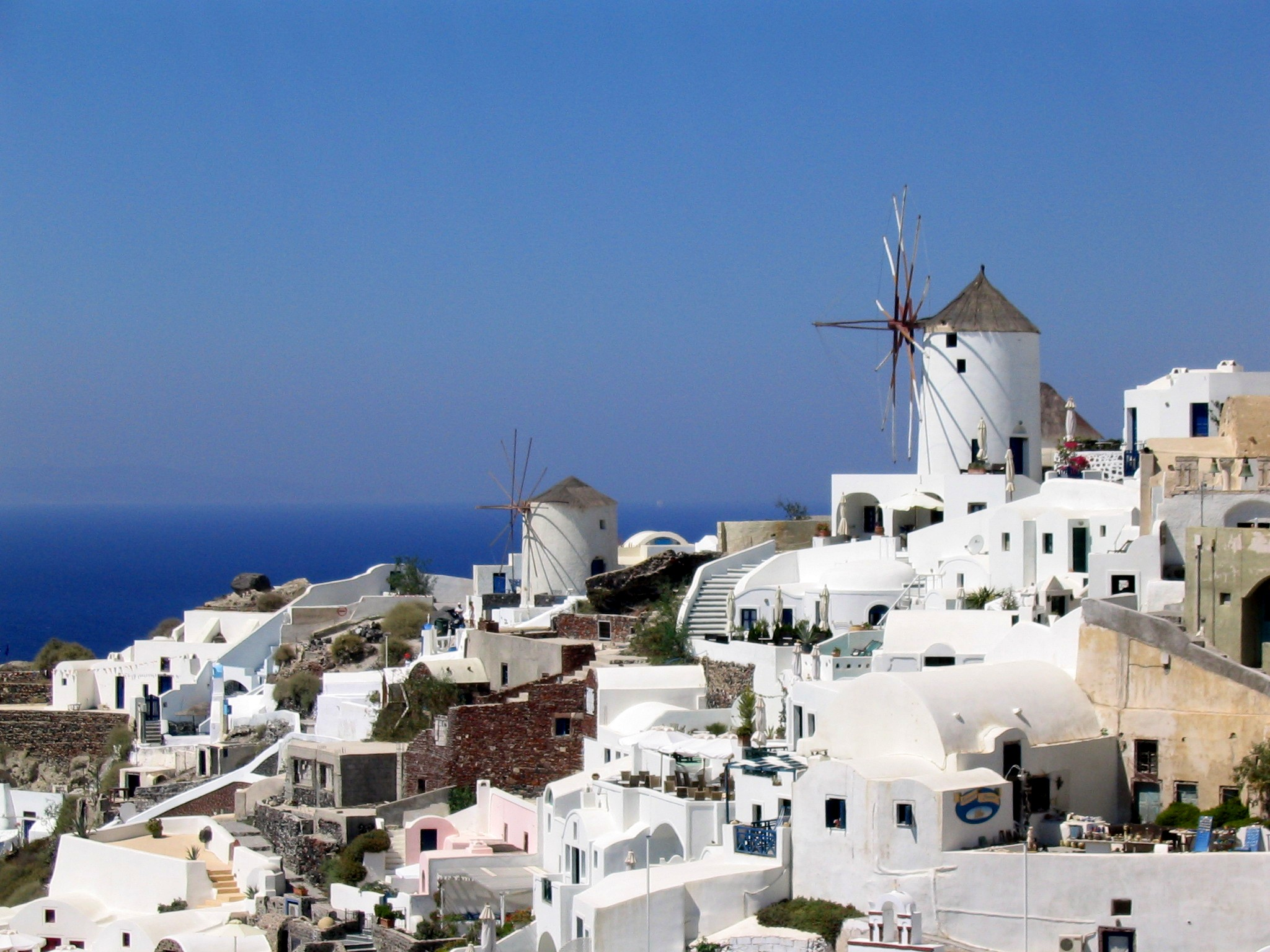
The windmills of Oia in Santorini served as the backdrop for the Roadblock.

- Episode 5 (5 September 2022)
- Prize: A A$5,000 travel voucher (awarded to Heath & Toni)

Locations

- Athens → Kamari (Santorini International Airport)
- Vlychada (Vlychada Fishing Port)
- Fira (Three Bells of Fira → Old Port)
- Fira (Karavolades Stairs)
- Oia (Glitzy Windmill)
- Oia (Church of Panagia Akathistos Hymn)

Episode summary

- During the Pit Stop, teams were flown to Santorini and began the leg outside the airport.
- This leg's Detour was a choice between Hustle or Bustle. In Hustle, teams had to sort through a pile of fish and extract 1.5 kilograms (3.3 lb) of octopus, one kilogram (2.2 lb) of bass and two kilograms (4.4 lb) of sardines to receive their next clue. In Bustle, teams had to repair five metres (16 ft) of damaged fishing net to receive their next clue.
- After the Detour, teams had to travel by gondola to the Old Port of Fira. There, teams had to carry 15 kilograms (33 lb) of luggage to the top of the Karavolades Stairs while also leading a donkey to receive their next clue.
- In this leg's Roadblock, one team member had to correctly perform three out of five parkour moves to receive their next clue directing them to the Pit Stop: the Church of Panagia Akathistos Hymn in Oia.

Additional note

- This was a non-elimination leg.

=== Leg 6 (Greece) ===
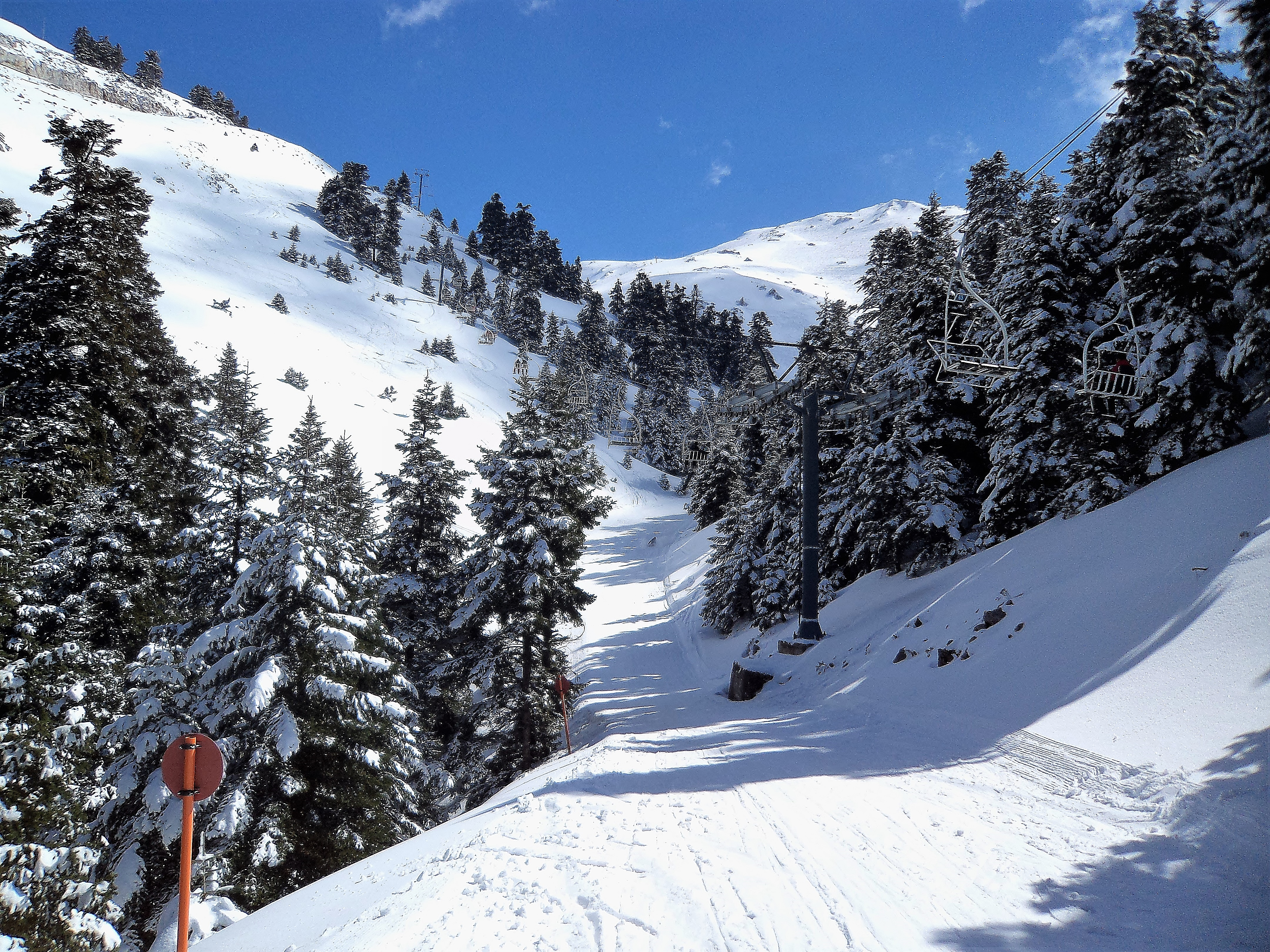
Mount Parnassus was the setting for the third leg in Greece.

- Episode 6 (6 September 2022)
- Eliminated: Sam & Stu

Locations

- Kamari → Athens
- Arachova (Egarsios Steps)
- Arachova (Church of Saint George (in Greek))
- Arachova (Clock Tower Overlook → Mount Parnassus)
- Arachova (Mount Parnassus → Arachova Outskirts)
- Arachova (Church of Saint George)

Episode summary

- During the Pit Stop, teams were flown back to Athens and began the leg at the Egarsios Steps in Arachova. Teams began climbing the steps in the order that they had finished the previous leg.
- At the Church of Saint George, teams had to dress as a bride and groom, and then the "groom" had to pin €10,000 onto the "bride" using 50 euro notes. Once the "bride" could spin three times without any of the notes falling off, the teams could then receive their next clue.
- Teams had to board one of two buses to Mount Parnassus. The first bus departed after eight teams boarded and the second departed once the remaining teams boarded. Once at Mount Parnassus, teams would have had to board the chair lift and toss snow bombs until one landed in a target to receive their next clue. Due to unfavourable weather conditions, this task was cancelled; teams instead had to build a snowman that was as tall as a shepherd's staff to receive their next clue.
- After travelling by bus back to Arachova, teams had to run two kilometres (1.2 mi) to the Pit Stop at the Church of Saint George.

Additional note

- Greek Winter Olympian Maria Ntanou appeared as the Pit Stop greeter for this leg.

=== Leg 7 (Greece → Turkey) ===
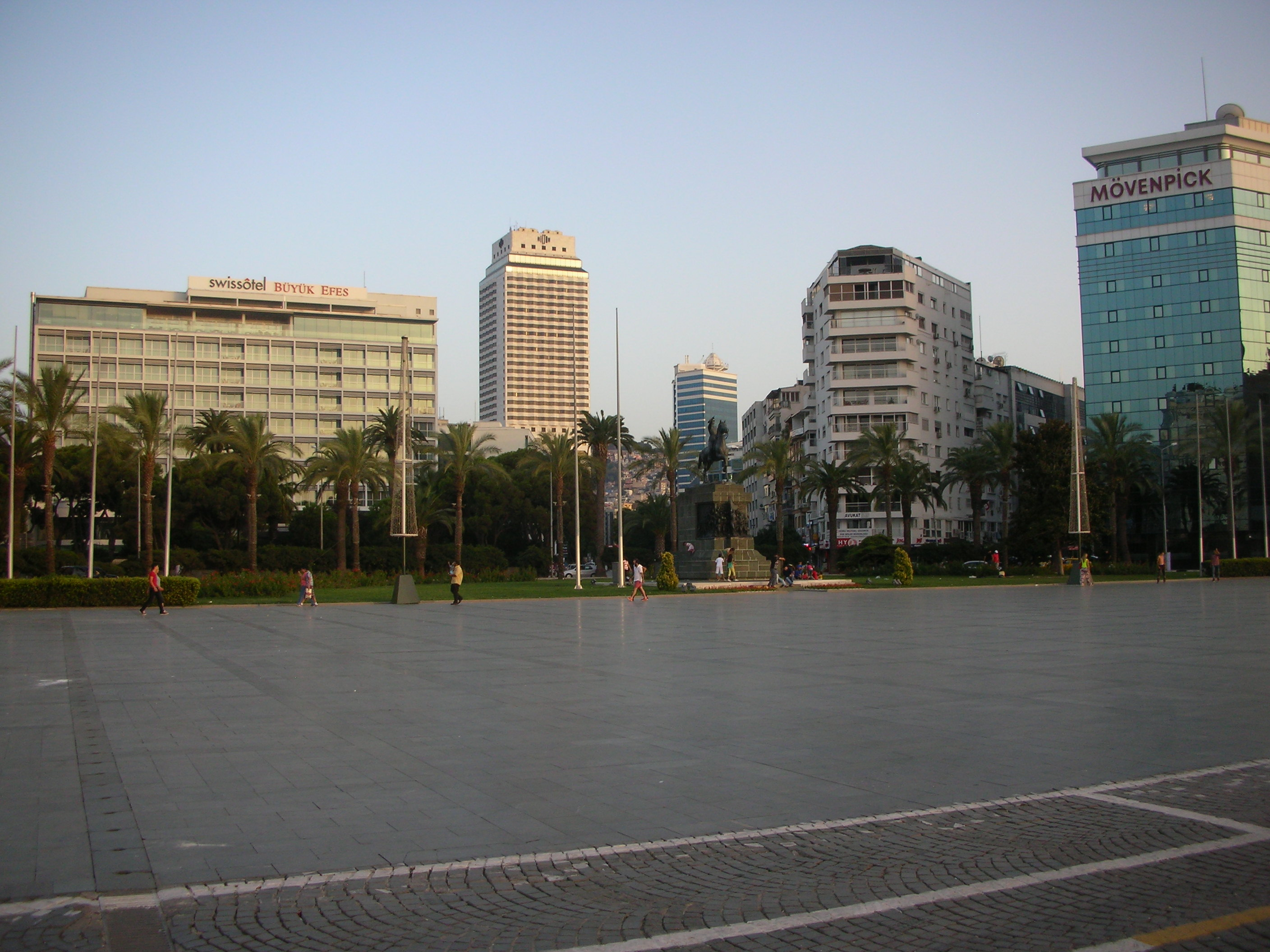
Cumhuriyet Meydanı served as the Pit Stop for the leg in İzmir.

- Episode 7 (11 September 2022)
- Prize: A trip for two to Nickelodeon Land at Sea World in Gold Coast, Queensland (awarded to Angel & Frankie)
- Eliminated: Crystal & Reem

Locations

- Arachova (Clock Tower Overlook)
- Athens → İzmir, Turkey
- İzmir (L'Agora Old Town Hotel)
- İzmir (Dr. Mustafa Enver Bey Cd.)
- İzmir (Kokoreççi Asim Usta)
- İzmir (Havra Sokağı → Kızlarağası Hanı (in Turkish))
- İzmir (Cumhuriyet Meydanı)

Episode summary

- At the start of this leg, teams were instructed to fly to İzmir, Turkey. Once there, teams had to travel to L'Agora Old Town Hotel, where they had to perform a Turkish belly dance while dressed in traditional costumes and Isis wings to receive their next clue. Teams were then directed to the Dr. Mustafa Enver Bey Cd., where one team member had to ride on a magic carpet – a carpet attached to an electric skateboard – through a marked street course, while their partner controlled the speed, to receive their next clue.
- In this leg's Roadblock, one team member had to prepare kokoreç by tightly wrapping sheep intestines and stomach lining onto a skewer and then eat a serving of to receive their next clue.
- Teams had to use poles to carry 100 gevreks from Havra Sokağı to a street vendor outside Kızlarağası Hanı without dropping the bread to receive their next clue, which directed them to the Pit Stop: the Cumhuriyet Meydanı.

Additional notes

- Stuart & Glennon were temporarily removed from the competition due to COVID-19.
- Akinrobotics' humanoid robot ADA, filling in for Beau Ryan who was in isolation due to COVID-19, appeared as the Pit Stop greeter for this leg.

=== Leg 8 (Turkey) ===
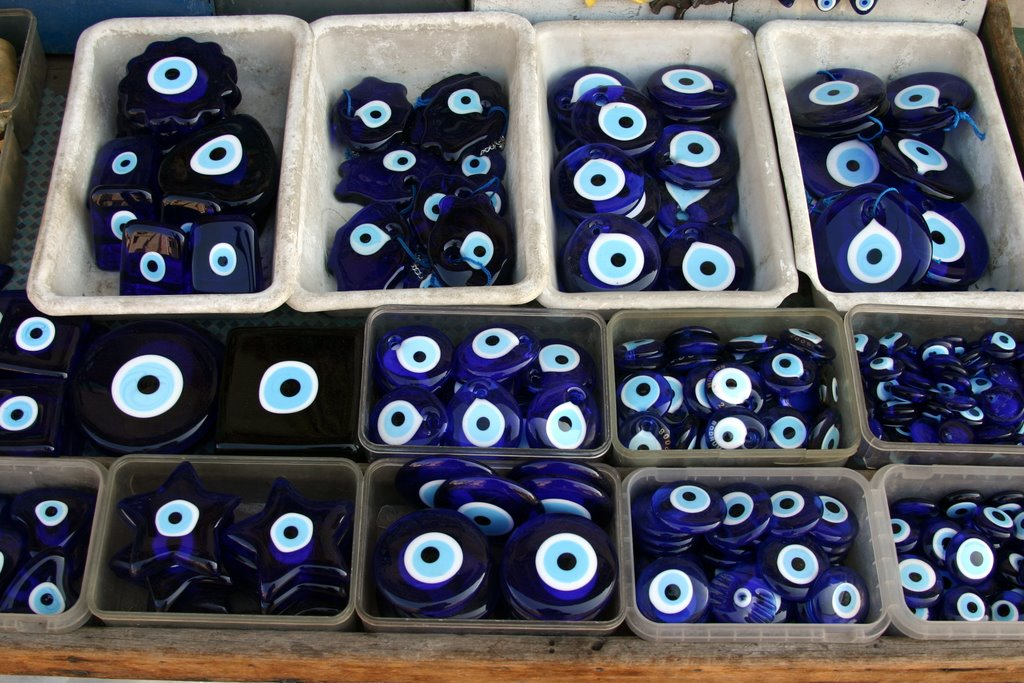
For the Roadblock in the Aegean Region, racers had to make a nazar boncuğu.

- Episode 8 (12 September 2022)
- Eliminated: Tammy & Vincent

Locations

- İzmir (Konak Square – İzmir Clock Tower)
- Nazarköy (Kimiz Farm)
- Nazarköy (Workshop)
- Kula (Streets or Essanlar Konağı)
- Kula (Gentlemen's House)

Episode summary

- At the start of this leg, teams had to input coordinates into a mobile navigation app to find Kimiz Farm, where they had to move a Turkish oil wrestler out of ring within three minutes to receive their next clue.
- In this leg's Roadblock, one team member had to make a nazar boncuğu, a glass talisman meant to ward off the evil eye, to receive their next clue.
- This leg's Detour was a choice between Street Procession or Sweet Obsession. In Street Procession, teams had to dress in festival attire and then perform a Turkish folk dance in a parade to receive their next clue. In Sweet Obsession, one team member had to wrap mesir paste sweets and toss them over their shoulder from a balcony. Their partner had to use an umbrella to catch 50 sweets to receive their next clue.
- After the Detour, teams had to check in at the Pit Stop: the Gentlemen's House in Kula.

Additional note

- Scott Tweedie temporarily replaced Beau Ryan as host after Ryan tested positive for COVID-19 and was required to self-isolate.

=== Leg 9 (Turkey) ===
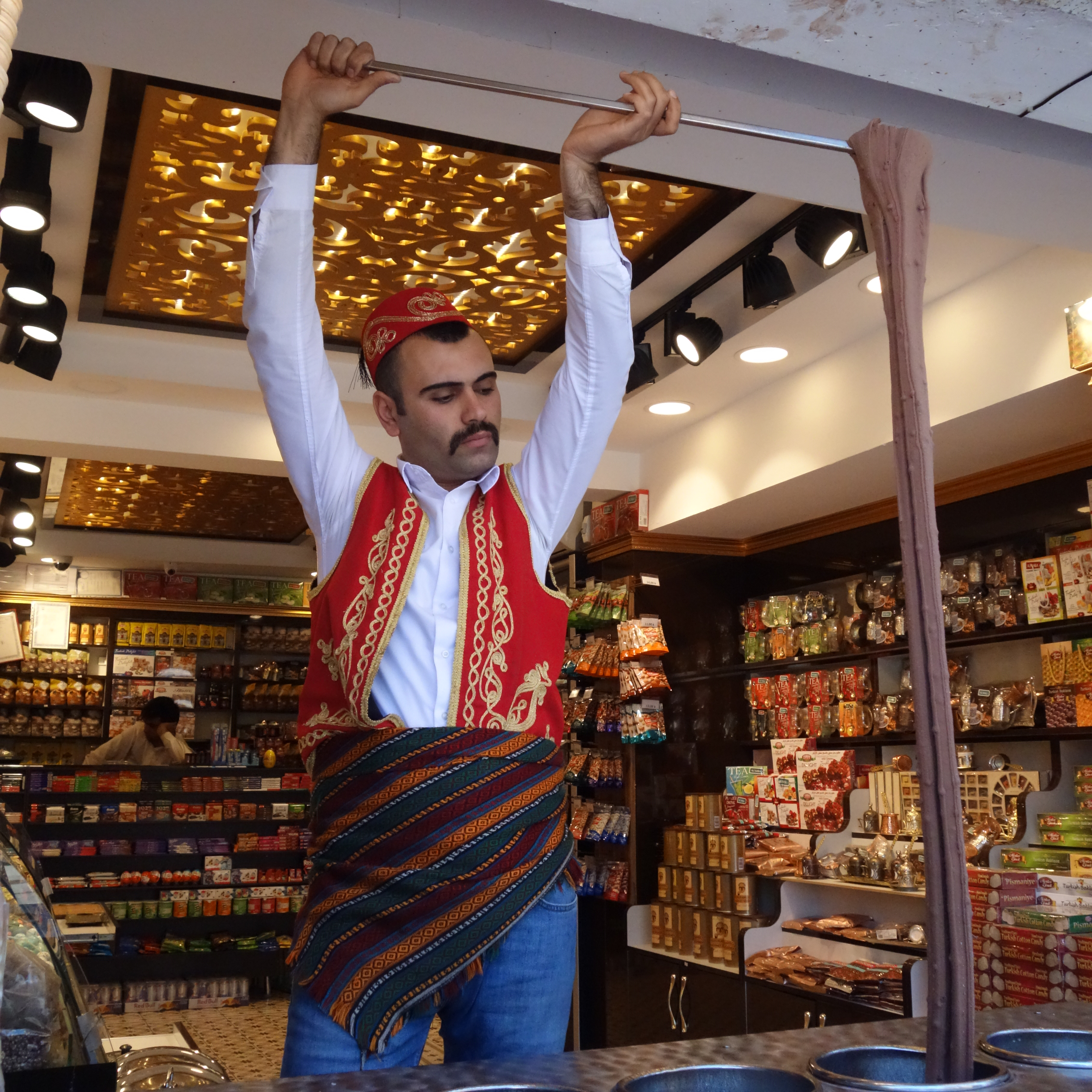
In Alaçatı, teams had to grab ice cream cones from a vendor.

- Episode 9 (13 September 2022)
- Prize: A six-night trip to Darwin, Northern Territory, Litchfield National Park, and Kakadu National Park (awarded to Angel & Frankie)
- Eliminated: Morgan & Lilli

Locations

- Alaçatı (Town Square)
- Alaçatı (Aya Yorgi Bay)
- Alaçatı (Bum Alaçatı)
- Alaçatı (Alaçatı Değirmenleri)

Episode summary

- At the start of this leg, teams had to travel to the town square in Alaçatı and grab two Maraş ice cream cones undamaged from a vendor to receive their next clue.
- In this leg's Roadblock, which was simply presented to viewers as an additional task, one team member had to drive a JetCar, an amphibious sports car, through a marked course and then perform a figure eight and two doughnuts within 90 seconds to receive their next clue.
- After the Roadblock, teams had to travel to Bum Alaçatı, where they had to use their faces to search a large bowl of icing sugar until they found a yellow Turkish delight to receive their next clue, which directed them to the Pit Stop: Alaçatı Değirmenleri.

=== Leg 10 (Turkey → Colombia) ===
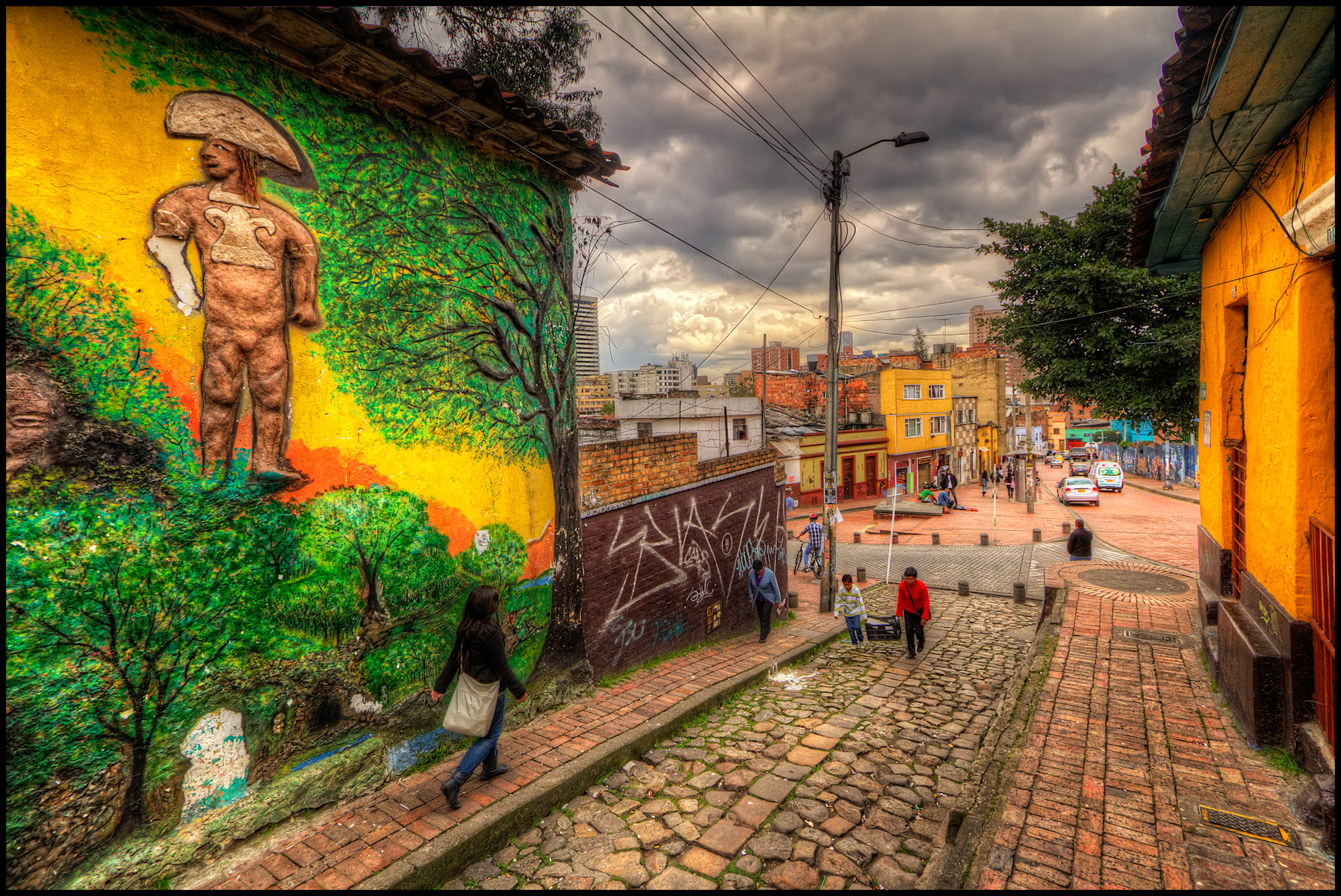
In Bogotá, teams explored the street art of La Candelaria.

- Episode 10 (18 September 2022)
- Eliminated: Kathy & Chace

Locations

- Çeşme (Radisson Blu Resort & Spa)
- İzmir → Bogotá, Colombia
- Bogotá (Parque de los Periodistas (in Spanish) – Templete al Libertador)
- Bogotá (La Candelaria – Calle del Embudo)
- Bogotá (Emerald District or Parque La Concordia)
- Bogotá (Club De Tejo La 76)
- Bogotá (Samper Mendoza Market)
- Bogotá (Parque Bicentenario)

Episode summary

- At the start of this leg, teams were instructed to fly to Bogotá, Colombia. Once there, teams had to travel to the Templete al Libertador in Parque de los Periodistas, where they found their next clue and a cellphone. Teams then had to take selfies of three graffiti artworks made by street artist Guache in La Candelaria that had to include the teams, the art and the artist's signature to receive their next clue.
- This leg's Detour was a choice between Sparkle or Spoke. In Sparkle, teams had to correctly sort real and synthetic emeralds to receive their next clue. In Spoke, teams had to play bike polo and score a goal against a defender within ten minutes to receive their next clue.
- After the Detour, teams had to play tejo at Club De Tejo La 76 by tossing iron discs until one landed on a gunpowder-filled target to receive their next clue, which directed them to the Samper Mendoza Market. There, teams had to purchase specified amounts of seven herbs to receive their next clue. Teams had to order the ingredients in Spanish without showing the list to the vendors.
- Kathy & Chace and Stuart & Glennon were cleared to return to the competition. As a result, both teams had to complete a Speed Bump: purchasing three additional herbs at the market.
- Teams had to check in at the Pit Stop: Parque Bicentenario.

Additional note

- Kelly & Georgia, Tiffany & Cynthia, Lauren & Steph, Jodie & Claire, and Fliss & Tottie were temporarily removed from the competition due to COVID-19.

=== Leg 11 (Colombia) ===
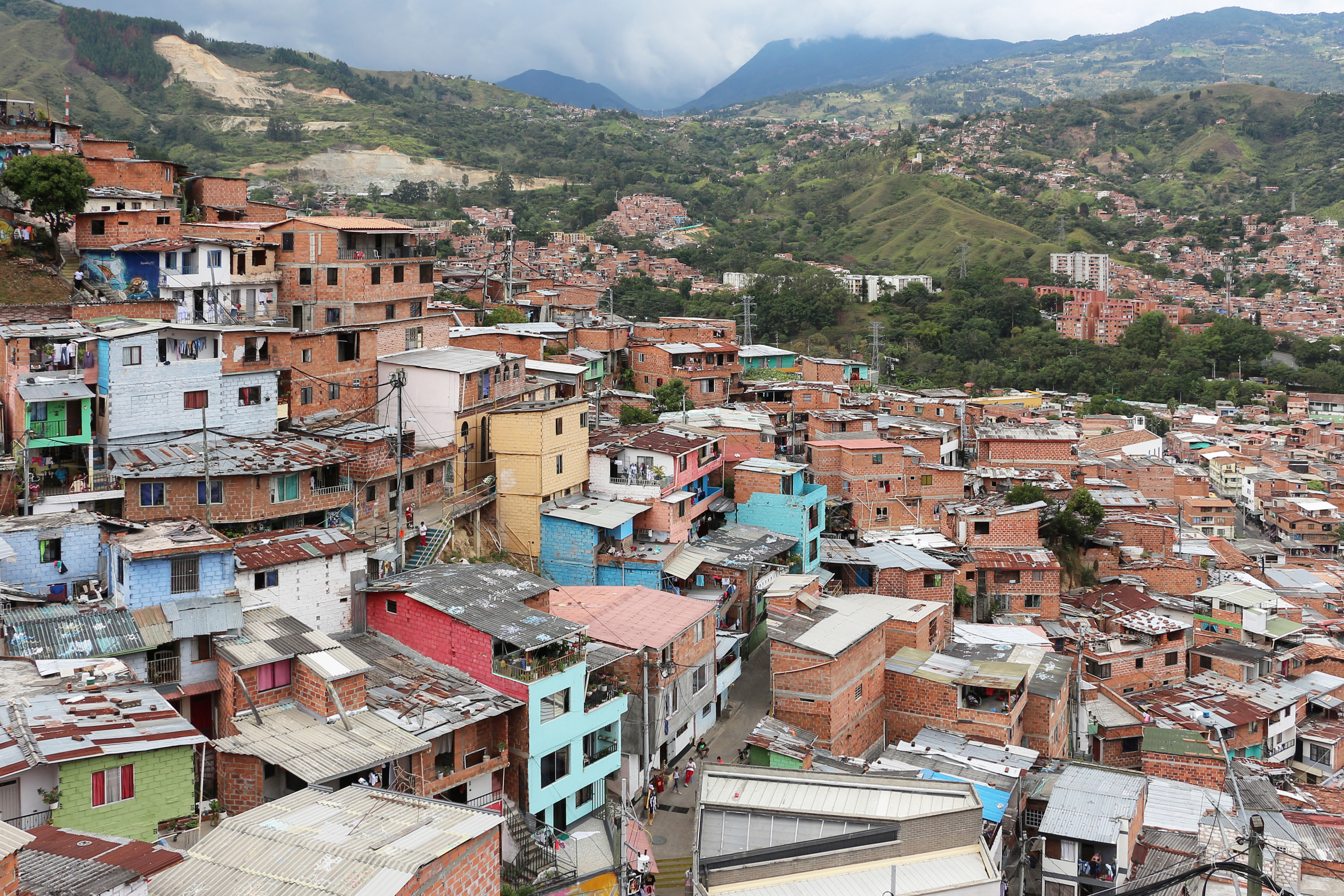
The Roadblock and Pit Stop in Medellín were located in Comuna 13.

- Episode 11 (19 September 2022)
- Prize: A$5,000 (awarded to Pako & Mori)

Locations

- Bogotá → Medellín (José María Córdova International Airport)
- Guatapé (El Peñól)
- Medellín (Finca Torremolino)
- Medellín (Comuna 13)
- Medellín (Comuna 13 – Fonda Familia 13)

Episode summary

- During the Pit Stop, teams were flown to Medellín and began the leg outside the airport. Teams exited the airport in the order that they had finished the previous leg. Teams had to travel to El Peñón de Guatapé, where they had to climb over 700 stairs to reach their next clue at the summit.
- This leg's Detour was a choice between Brew or Bunch. In Brew, teams had to search through a nine-kilogram (20 lb) sack of coffee beans and find five beans that had the necessary letters to spell AROMA to receive their next clue. In Bunch, teams had to collect flowers and recreate a flower arrangement called a silleta. After placing the silleta on a team member's back, teams received their next clue.
- In this leg's Roadblock, one team member had to eat an eyeball salad and tripa de cerda, which included pig intestines and tongue, to receive their next clue directing them to the Pit Stop: Fonda Familia 13 in Comuna 13.

Additional note

- This was a non-elimination leg.

=== Leg 12 (Colombia) ===
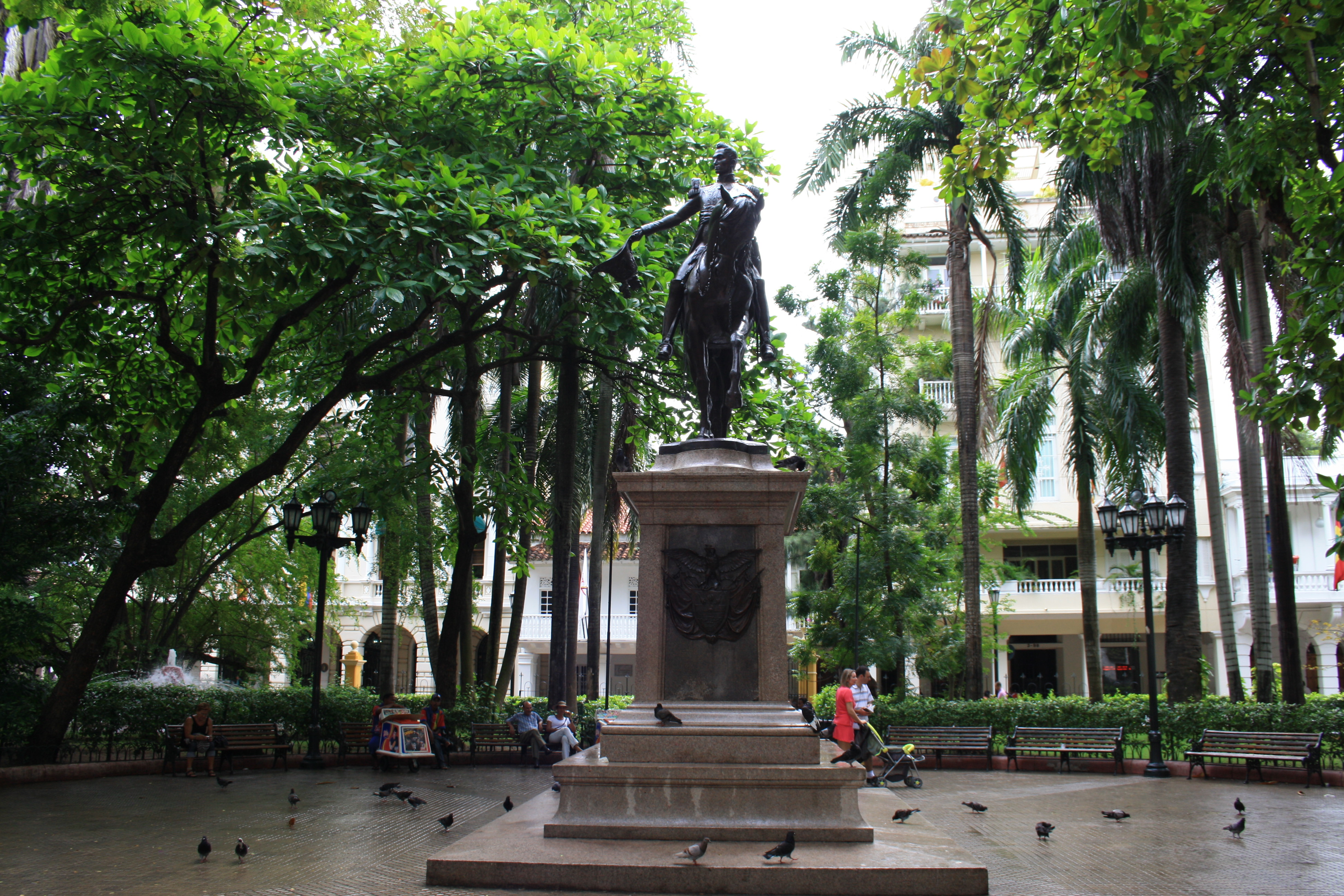
Teams performed a salsa dance at Parque de Bolívar in Cartagena, Colombia.

- Episode 12 (20 September 2022)
- Eliminated: Stuart & Glennon

Locations

- Medellín → Cartagena (Rafael Núñez International Airport)
- La Boquilla (La Perla Negra)
- La Boquilla (La Boquilla Community Centre)
- Cartagena (Parque San Diego)
- Cartagena (Parque de Bolívar (in Spanish))
- Cartagena (Castillo San Felipe de Barajas)

Episode summary

- During the Pit Stop, teams were flown to Cartagena and began the leg outside the airport. Teams had to travel to La Perla Negra, where they had to make ten arepas and then deliver them to the community centre to receive their next clue.
- At Parque San Diego, teams had to place a bowl of fruit on a team member's head and sell COL$20,000 (approximately A$6.90) worth of fruit to receive their next clue.
- At Parque de Bolívar, teams had to perform a Colombian-style salsa to receive their next clue, which directed them to the Pit Stop: Castillo San Felipe de Barajas.

Additional note

- Beau Ryan returned as host after missing the previous five legs due to COVID-19.

=== Leg 13 (Colombia → Belize) ===
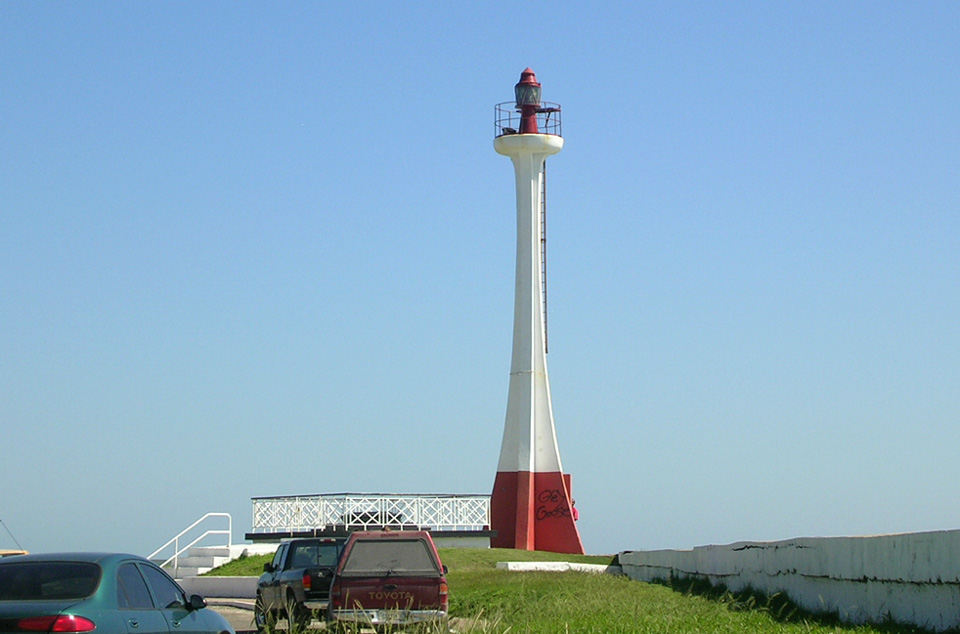
Baron Bliss Lighthouse hosted the Pit Stop in Belize City.

- Episode 13 (25 September 2022)
- Prize: A trip for two to Cradle Coast, Tasmania (awarded to Chelsea & Jamus)
- Eliminated: Flick & Gabby

Locations

- Cartagena → Belize City, Belize or Cancún, Mexico
- Belize City (Philip S. W. Goldson International Airport)
- Rockstone Pond (Belize Exotic Adventures)
- Belize City (Travellers Liquors Distillery)
- Belize City (Best Western)
- La Democracia (Belize Zoo)
- Belize City (Dario's Meat Pies or Digi Park)
- Belize City (Baron Bliss Lighthouse)

Episode summary

- At the start of this leg, teams were instructed to fly to Belize City, Belize. At the airport, teams received their next clue and were instructed to use a provided electronic navigator to direct a driver to Belize Exotic Adventures, where they had to search for a bag of firewood and a bag of cashew nuts. Teams then had to roast and shell the nuts to receive their next clue.
- In this leg's Roadblock, one team member had to clean 36 recycled rum bottles and then place them on drying racks to receive their next clue.
- Teams had to travel to the Best Western hotel in Belize City. Teams then travelled to the Belize Zoo the following morning in the order that they had arrived at the hotel. There, teams had to feed a tapir its breakfast; and then drain, clean and refill the tapir's waste pool to receive their next clue. As tapirs can become aggressive, teams could only perform this task while the tapirs were eating.
- This leg's Detour was a choice between Heat or Beat. For this leg, once teams chose a task they could not switch. In Heat, teams had to eat 25 hot meat pies to receive their next clue. Teams had to put the pot's lid back on after grabbing a pie; otherwise they had to start over. In Beat, teams had to learn to play "Waltzing Matilda" on the steelpan and then play in unison with the Pantempters Steel Orchestra to receive their next clue.
- After the Detour, teams had to check in at the Pit Stop: the Baron Bliss Lighthouse.

Additional notes

- Angel was bumped from the flight to Belize and diverted to Cancún, Mexico. She then travelled by private car to Belize City, where she met up with Frankie in the middle of the leg. Frankie had to perform all of the tasks by himself until Angel arrived.
- Belize City mayor Bernard Wagner appeared as the Pit Stop greeter for this leg.

=== Leg 14 (Belize) ===
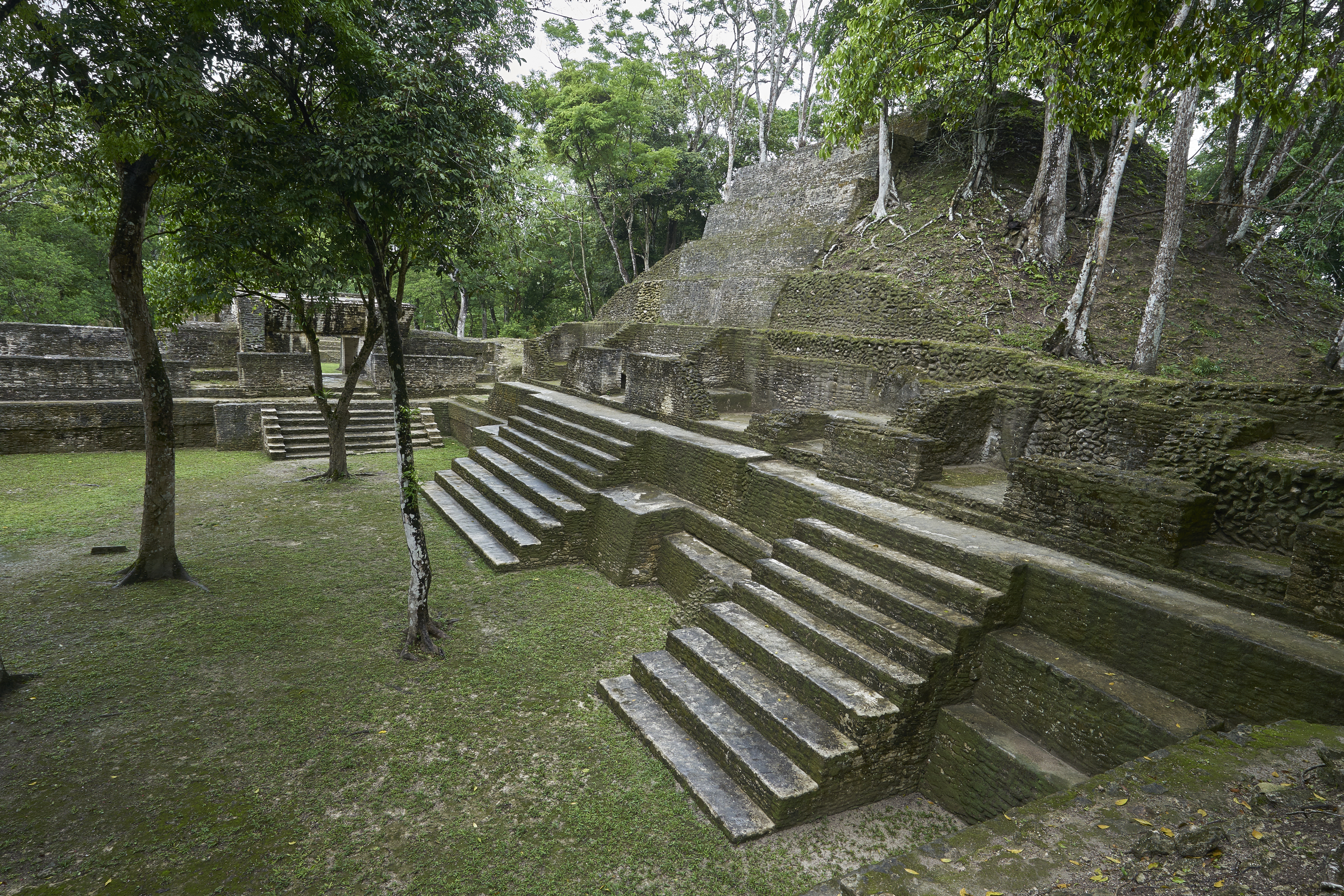
The Detour at the ruins of Cahal Pech were based on Mayan traditions.

- Episode 14 (26 September 2022)
- Prize: A three-night holiday to Bali, Indonesia (awarded to Heath & Toni)
- Medically Removed: Fliss & Tottie

Locations

- Belize City (Battlefield Park)
- Santa Cruz (Santa Cruz School)
- San Ignacio (Cahal Pech)
- San Ignacio (Hawkesworth Bridge)
- Cayo District (Xunantunich)

Episode summary

- Teams began this leg by departing Battlefield Park at the same time. Teams had to travel to the Santa Cruz School, where they had to weed a plotted section of a greenhouse, plant ginger, lemongrass and chili so that they matched a sample plot and repair a section of roof and siding to receive their next clue.
- Fliss & Tottie, Jodie & Claire, Kelly & Georgia, and Tiffany & Cynthia were cleared to return to the competition. As a result, they all had to complete a Speed Bump before they could continue racing: cleaning ten pieces of school furniture.
- This leg's Detour was a choice between Score or Solve. In Score, teams had to play pok-a-tok and score a goal by getting a ball through a ring without using their hands to receive their next clue. If teams missed after six attempts, they had to go to the back of the queue before they could try again. In Solve, teams had to solve a puzzle by spinning 36 movable pieces, each of which featured Maya numerals, so that each number appeared only once in any direction to receive their next clue.
- After the Detour, teams had to travel to the Hawkesworth Bridge, where they had to memorise the 18 months on a Maya calendar. Teams then had to paddle a canoe down the Macal River, find 18 stones engraved with the months and place them in chronological order on a blank calendar to receive their next clue. Teams then had to check in at the Pit Stop: Xunantunich.

=== Leg 15 (Belize) ===
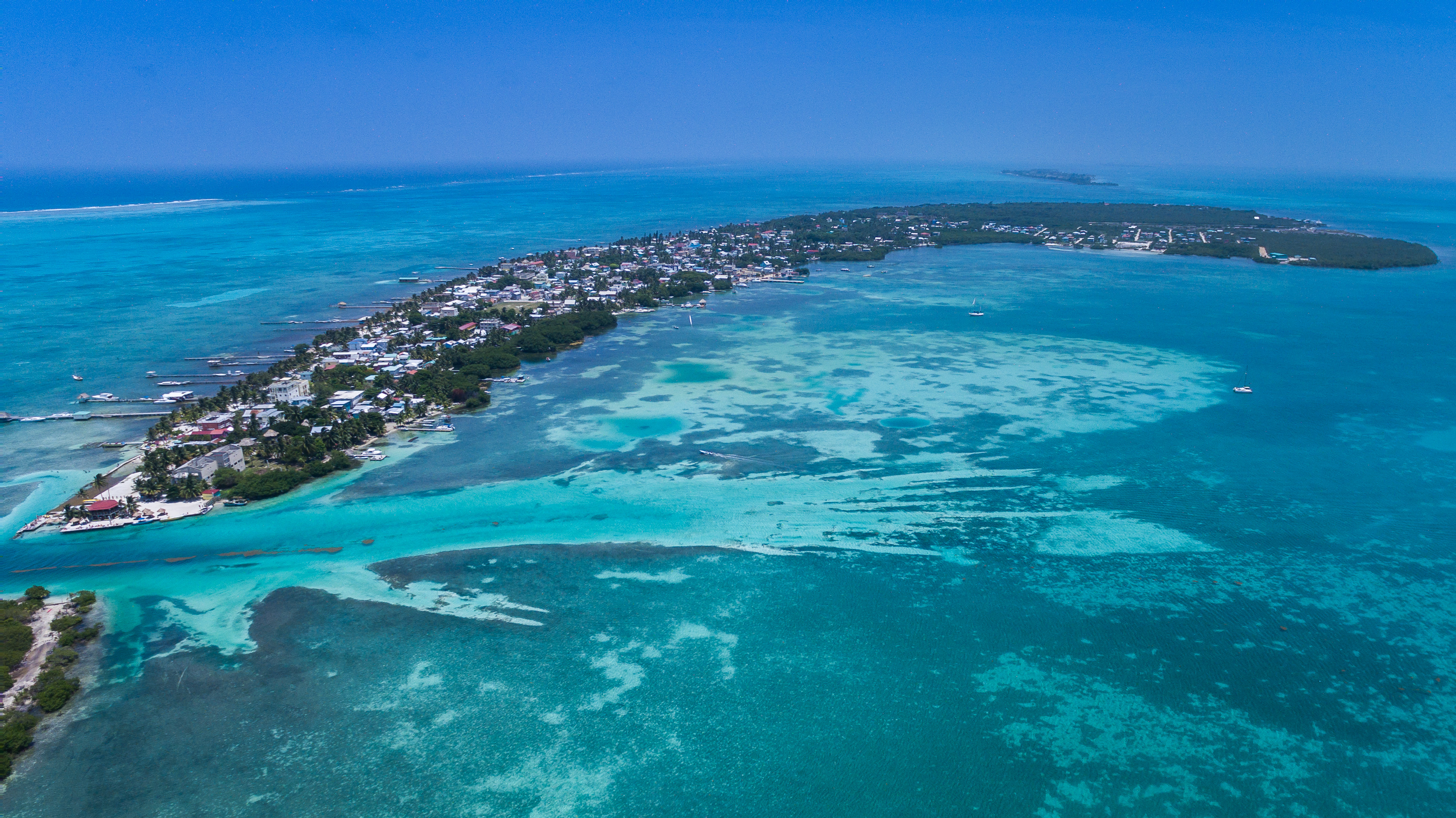
The third leg in Belize took place on Caye Caulker in the Belize Barrier Reef.

- Episode 15 (27 September 2022)
- Prizes: Two 4K televisions (awarded to Heath & Toni)
- Eliminated: Jodie & Claire

Locations

- Belize City (Radisson Fort George)
- Belize City → Caye Caulker (Feeding Dock)
- Caye Caulker (Shark Ray Alley)
- Caye Caulker (Da Real Macaw or The Lazy Lizard)
- Caye Caulker (Il Pellicano Cucina Italiana)
- Caye Caulker (The Split)
- Caye Caulker (Northside Beach Bar)

Episode summary

- At the start of this leg, teams had to run to a marina to board one of two boats, each of which carried four teams, to Caye Caulker. Once there, teams had to feed tarpons at the feeding dock to receive their next clue.
- In this leg's first Roadblock, one team member had to swim in shark-inhabited waters and find a conch marked with Amazing Race colours to receive their next clue.
- This leg's Detour was a choice between Twirl It or Twerk It. In Twirl It, teams had to braid a woman's hair with eight cornrows to receive their next clue. In Twerk It, teams had to perform a soca dance to receive their next clue.
- In this leg's second Roadblock, one team member, regardless of who performed the first Roadblock, had to slowly pedal a bike for 150 seconds to the end of a short, bumpy road to receive their next clue.
- Lauren & Steph were cleared to return to the competition. As a result, they had to complete a Speed Bump before they could continue racing: the team member who did not perform the second Roadblock also had to complete it.
- After the second Roadblock, teams had to travel by ferry across The Split and then travel on foot to the Pit Stop: the Northside Beach Bar.

=== Leg 16 (Belize → Mexico) ===
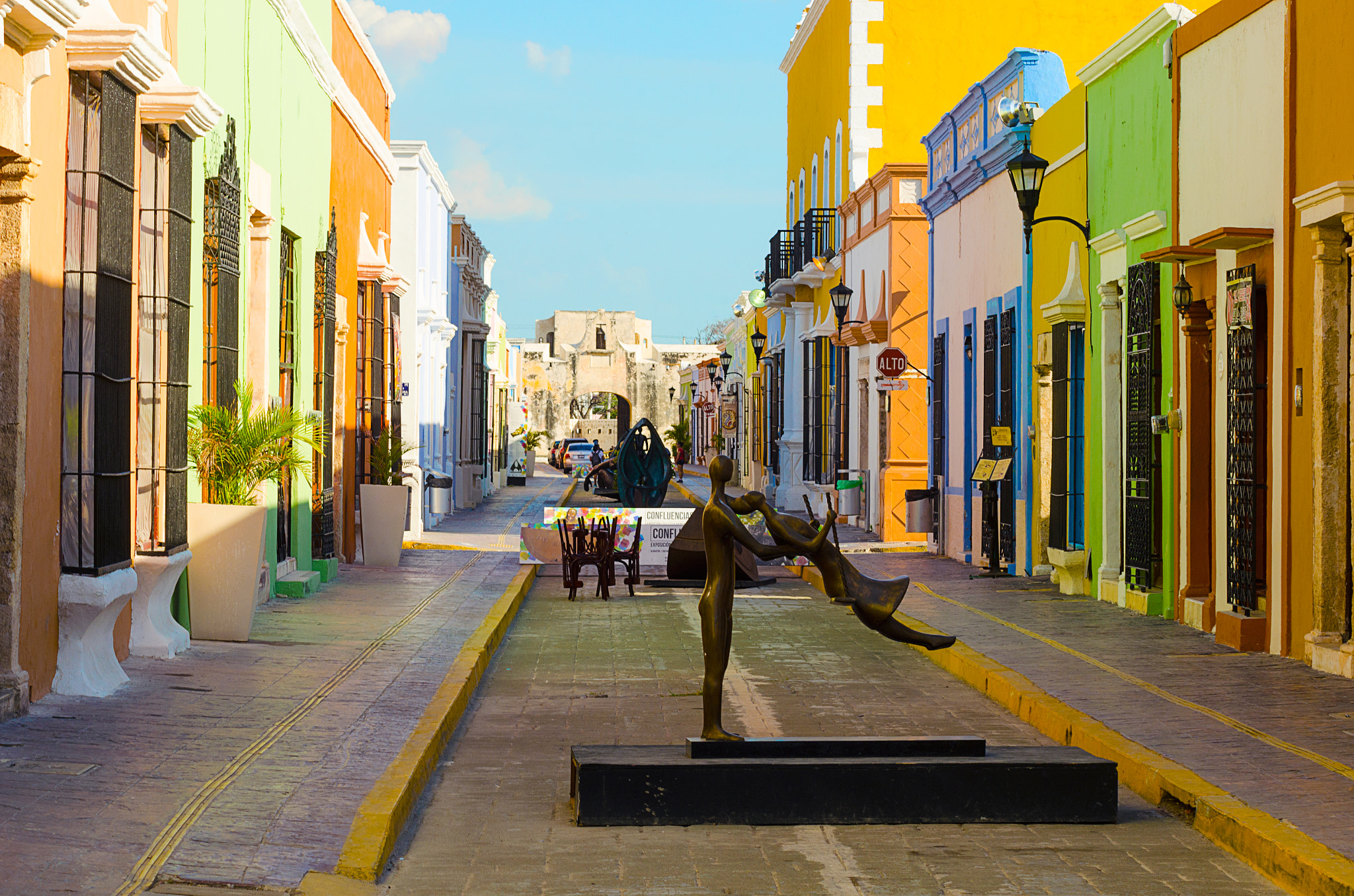
While in Campeche City, teams had to memorise the colours of the buildings on Calle 59.

- Episode 16 (28 September 2022)

Locations

- Belize City → Campeche City, Mexico (Salon Rincón Colonial)
- Campeche City (Parque San Roman)
- Campeche City (Calle 59)
- Sotuta de Peón (Hacienda Sotuta de Peón)
- Sotuta de Peón (Sotuta Cenote)
- Sotuta de Peón (Hacienda Sotuta de Peón)

Episode summary

- At the start of this leg, teams were instructed to travel by bus to Campeche City, Mexico. At the Salon Rincón Colonial, one team member had to feed their blindfolded partner crickets, a desert scorpion, a tarantula and a hissing cockroach. After eating, they had to correctly identify all four to receive their next clue. If they got any wrong, both team members had to eat a piece of hot pepper before trying again.
- Teams then had to travel to Parque San Roman, where they had to use a large slingshot to shoot balls at two piñatas. After they dropped both piñatas, teams had to use sticks to break them open to find the one Amazing Race-coloured lolly that they could exchange for their next clue.
- On Calle 59, teams had to memorise the colours of 25 houses on one side of the street and then place colour swatches on a board in the correct order to receive their next clue. Teams were then directed to Hacienda Sotuta de Peón, where they had to carry two bundles of henequen to a factory, comb the plant's fibers and then spin the fibers into five metres (16 ft) of rope to receive their next clue.
- In this leg's Roadblock, one team member had to freedive to the bottom of a cenote to retrieve their next clue directing them to the nearby Pit Stop at Hacienda Sotuta de Peón.

Additional note

- There was no elimination at the end of this leg; all teams were instead instructed to continue racing.

=== Leg 17 (Mexico) ===
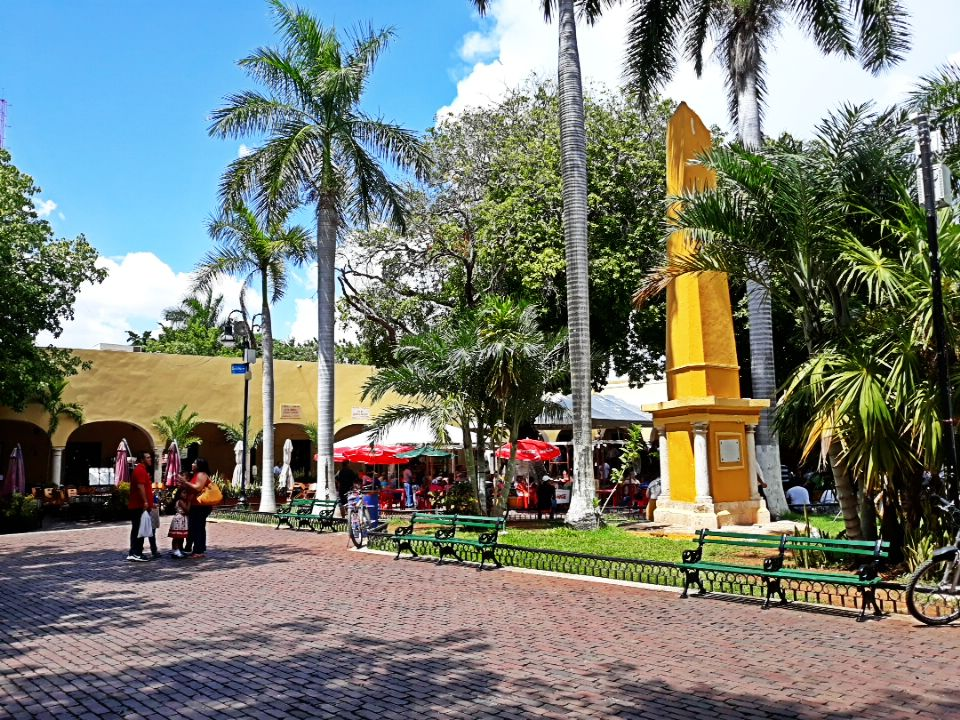
For one Detour option in Mérida, teams had to sing with a mariachi band at Parque de Santa Lucía.

- Episode 17 (29 September 2022)
- Prize: A four-night holiday for two to Cairns, Queensland and the Great Barrier Reef (awarded to Kelly & Georgia)
- Eliminated: Chelsea & Jamus

Locations

- Mérida (Palacio Municipal de Mérida)
- Mérida (Taqueria La Lupita or Parque de Santa Lucía)
- Mérida (Cementerio General)
- Mérida (Calle 64)
- Mérida (El Minaret)

Episode summary

- At the start of this leg, teams were instructed to drive to Mérida and find their next clue at Palacio Municipal de Mérida.
- This season's final Detour was a choice between Cactus or Chorus. In Cactus, teams had to make five cactus tacos to receive their next clue. In Chorus, teams had to sing "La Cucaracha" with a mariachi band to receive their next clue.
- After the Detour, teams had to travel to the Cementerio General, where each team member had to paint a Day of the Dead calavera design onto their partner's face to receive their next clue.
- In this leg's Roadblock, one team member had to count the number of light pink-coloured papel picados strung among 3,000 to receive their next clue, which directed them to the Pit Stop: El Minaret.

Additional notes

- This leg featured a Double U-Turn. Heath & Toni chose to use the U-Turn on Tiffany & Cynthia, while Pako & Mori chose to use the U-Turn on Lauren & Steph.
- Boxers Yéssica Montiel and Katya Martel Ayala appeared as the Pit Stop greeters for this leg.
- Although the last team to arrive at the Pit Stop was eliminated, there was no rest period at the end of the leg and all of the remaining teams were instead instructed to continue racing.

=== Leg 18 (Mexico) ===
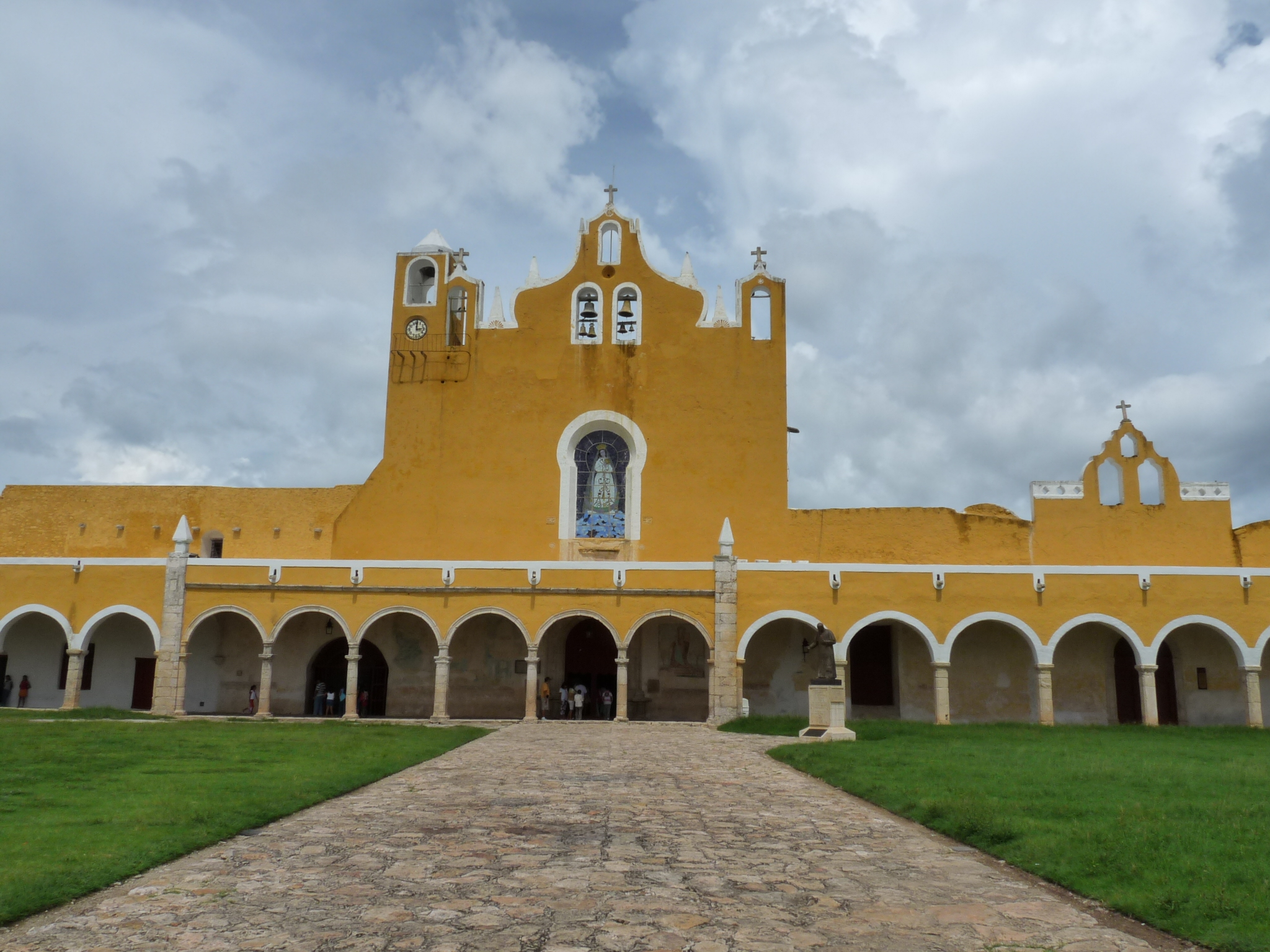
After arriving in Izamal, teams travelled to Convento de San Antonio de Padua.

- Episode 18 (2 October 2022)
- Prize: A A$5,000 RedBalloon voucher (awarded to Heath & Toni)
- Eliminated: Lauren & Steph

Locations

- Izamal (Convento de San Antonio de Padua (in Spanish))
- Izamal (Intersection of Calles 24 & 31)
- Sudzal (Calle 5)
- Ekʼ Balam (Cenote X'Canché)

Episode summary

- At the start of this leg, teams had to drive to the Convento de San Antonio de Padua in Izamal, where they had to perform a Yucatecan dance, which involved balancing a beer bottle on their heads, to receive their next clue. Teams then had to count the number of interior and exterior arches in the convent, travel by going horseback riding to the street intersection with the same numbers and knock on a door to receive their next clue.
- In this leg's Roadblock, one team member had to complete a flower embroidery to receive their next clue.
- At Cenote X'Canché, teams had to ride a zipline, drop into the cenote and then swim to the Pit Stop.

=== Leg 19 (Mexico → Australia) ===
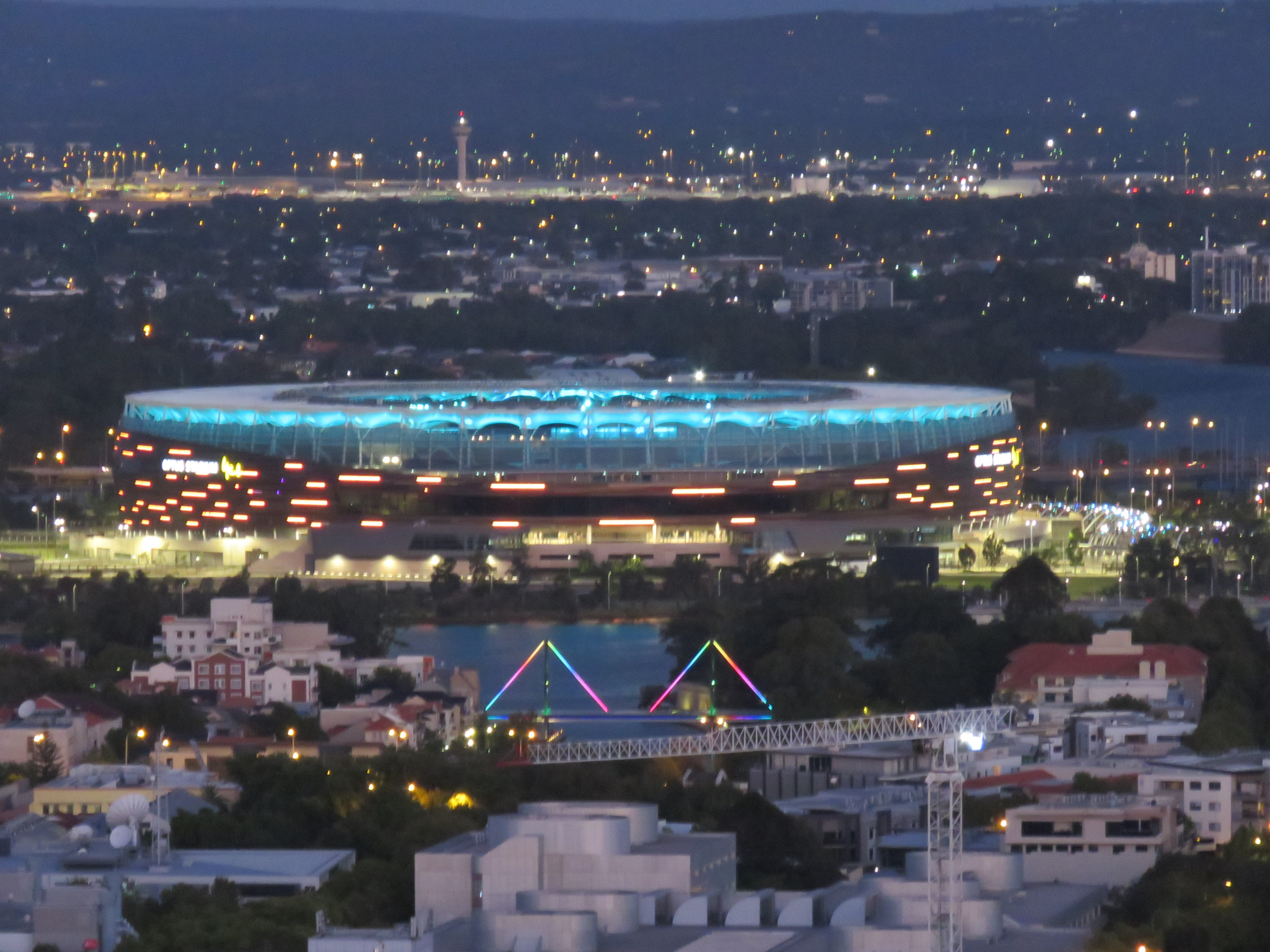
The final task in Perth was set at Optus Stadium.

- Episode 19 (3 October 2022)
- Eliminated: Pako & Mori

Locations

- Valladolid (Real Hispano)
- Mérida → Perth, Western Australia
- Perth (Jandakot Airport – Royal Aero Club)
- Perth (Swan Bells Tower)
- Perth (Murray Street Mall – Ready Team One)
- Perth (Optus Stadium)
- Perth (Perth Mint)

Episode summary

- At the start of this leg, teams were instructed to fly to Perth, Western Australia. Once there, teams had to travel to the Royal Aero Club at Jandakot Airport to find their next clue.
- In this leg's Roadblock, one team member had to memorise Australian aviation trivia during an aerobatics flight. After returning to the ground, they had to correctly answer five questions to receive their next clue.
- At the Swan Bells Tower, teams had to ring two bells simultaneously four times within four minutes to receive their next clue. Teams then had to travel to Ready Team One, where they had to play a virtual reality game and kill an alien to receive their next clue.
- At Optus Stadium, teams had to hang upside-down and memorise the six seasons of the Noongar calendar to receive their next clue, which directed them to the Pit Stop: the Perth Mint.

=== Leg 20 (Australia) ===
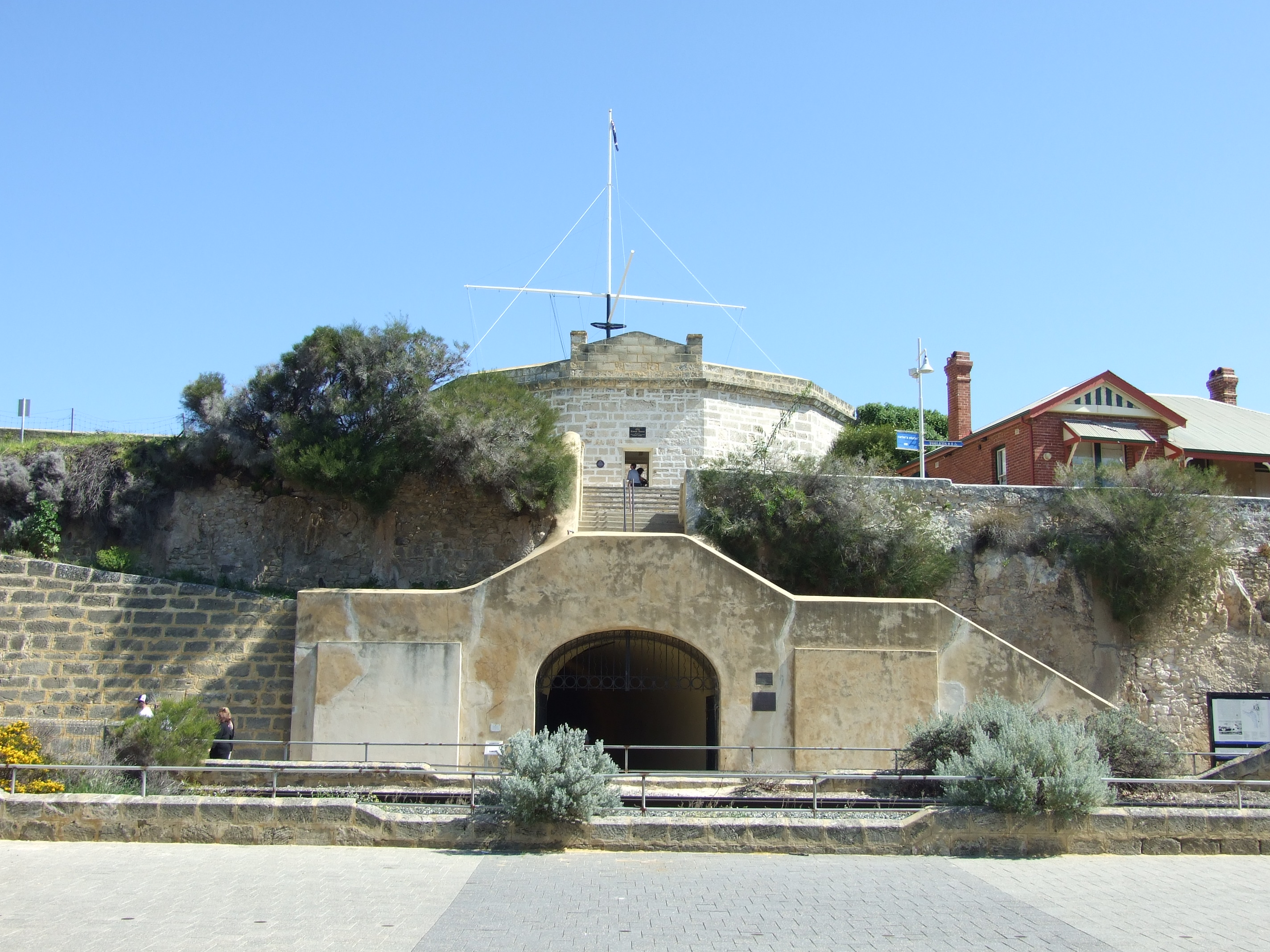
Racers had to toss food to their partner locked in a pillory at Round House.

- Episode 20 (4 October 2022)
- Eliminated: Tiffany & Cynthia

Locations

- Fremantle (Fremantle Town Hall)
- Fremantle → Rottnest Island
- Rottnest Island (Rottnest Island Airport – Geronimo Skydive)
- Rottnest Island (Army Jetty)
- Rottnest Island → Fremantle
- Fremantle (Gage Roads Brewing Company)
- Fremantle (Round House)
- Fremantle (Fremantle Fishing Boat Harbour – Statue of Bon Scott)
- Fremantle (South Mole Lighthouse)

Episode summary

- At the start of this leg, teams boarded a ferry to Rottnest Island and received their next clue on the ferry. Teams were released from the ferry in the order that they had finished the previous leg.
- In this leg's Roadblock, both team members had to travel by Segway to the island's airfield, where one team member had to perform a 15,000-foot (4,600 m) skydive before reuniting with their partner to receive their next clue.
- Teams had to travel by ferry back to Fremantle and make their way to Gage Roads Brewing Company. There, teams had to carry 0.5 tonnes (0.49 long tons; 0.55 short tons) of malt to a loading dock. Both team members then had to drink a yard glass of non-alcoholic beer to receive their next clue.
- At the Round House, one team member was locked in a pillory and had to catch a piece a bread and a piece of Spam tossed to them by their partner before consuming them with lime juice. Teams then had to ring the curfew bell to receive their next clue.
- Teams had to travel to the statue of Bon Scott at the Fremantle Fishing Boat Harbour to find their next clue, which directed them to the Pit Stop: the South Mole Lighthouse.

=== Leg 21 (Australia) ===
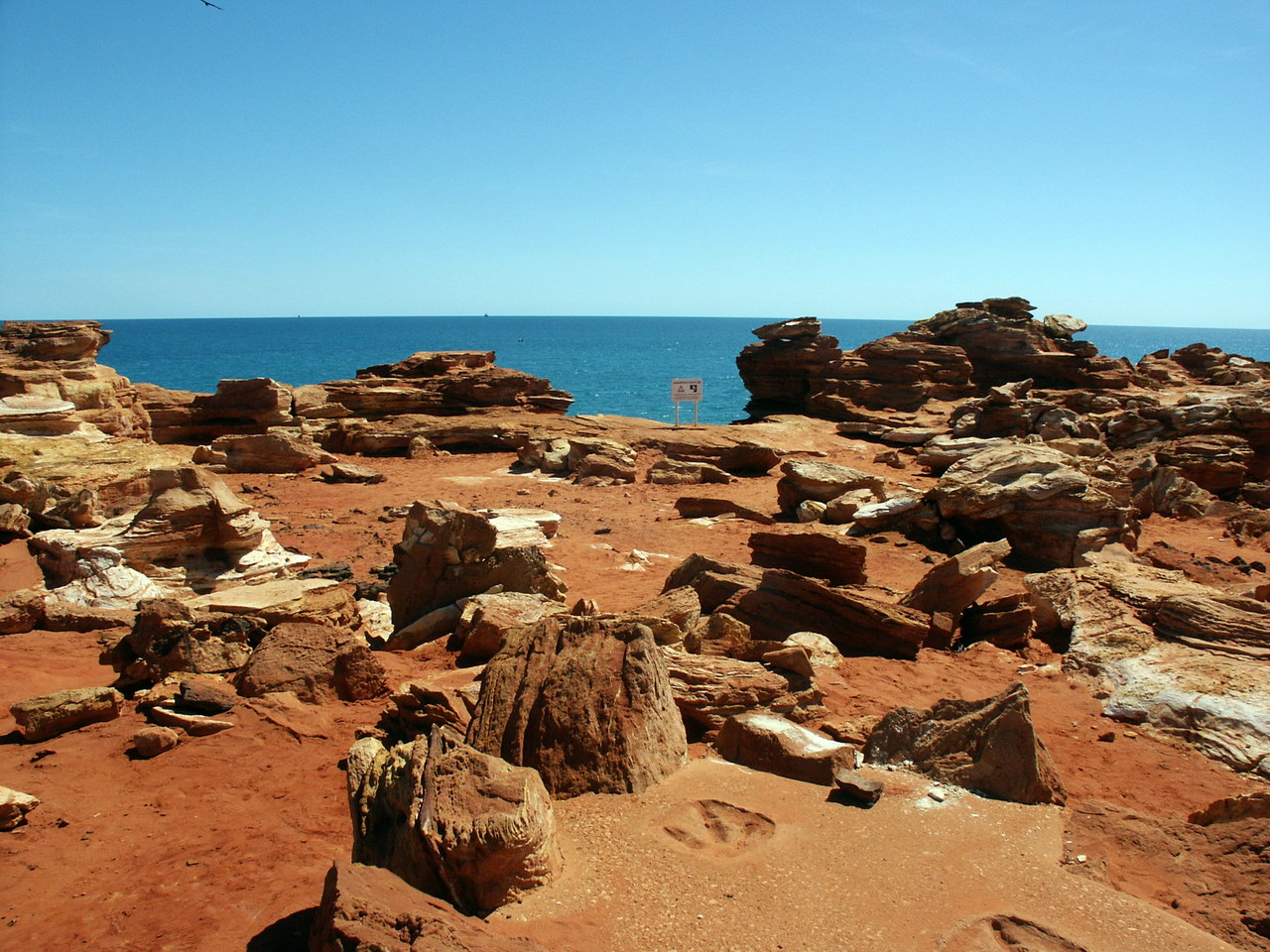
The final leg in the Kimberley concluded at Gantheaume Point.

- Episode 21 (9 October 2022)
- Prizes: A$250,000, an Isuzu D-MAX and an Isuzu MU-X (awarded to Heath & Toni)
- Winners: Heath & Toni
- Runners-up: Angel & Frankie
- Third place: Kelly & Georgia

Locations

- Perth → Broome
- Broome (Chinatown – Sun Picture Gardens)
- Waterbank (Willie Creek Pearl Farm)
- Waterbank (Willie Creek Sandbank)
- Broome (Mangroves)
- Broome (Mantra Frangipani & Simpsons Beach)
- Broome (Gantheaume Point)

Episode summary

- At the start of this leg, teams were instructed to fly to Broome. Once there, teams had to travel to Sun Picture Gardens, where they had to feed each other sweet and sour pork using 2.4-metre (7.9 ft) chopsticks to receive their next clue.
- In this leg's first Roadblock, one team member had to collect a panel of eight oysters, submerge them in water, coax four to open and insert a peg in each. When they found a pearl, teams could exchange it for their next clue.
- After the first Roadblock, teams travelled to the Willie Creek Sandbank, where one team member had to write the Yawuru word for dust storm – GUJUGUJU – in the sand, and their partner had to identify the word from a helicopter within three minutes to receive their next clue. Teams then travelled to the mangroves in Broome, where they had to find 20 snails, cook two using Aboriginal methods and then eat them to receive their next clue.
- In this season's final Roadblock, one team member, regardless of who performed the first Roadblock, had to collect a bucket and spade from Mantra Frangipani and then drive to Simpsons Beach. They then had to search through 200 sandcastles until they found a button to receive their next clue.
- Teams travelled to Gantheaume Point, where they had to arrange six replica clock towers based on the order that they visited them during the race. Teams that were observant would have seen TIME in all capital letters in several clues during the season. Once correct, teams received six clock faces representing the times that they were at each clock tower. After placing the times in order, they had to create a six-digit code that could unlock a chest containing their final clue, which directed them to the nearby finish line.

| Order | Clock | Country |
|---|---|---|
| 1 | Chefchaouen Clock | Morocco |
| 2 | Arachova Clock Tower | Greece |
| 3 | İzmir Clock Tower | Turkey |
| 4 | Supreme Court of Belize | Belize |
| 5 | Palacio Municipal de Mérida | Mexico |
| 6 | Fremantle Town Hall | Australia |

== Reception ==
=== Ratings ===
Rating data is from OzTAM and represents the viewership from the 5 largest Australian metropolitan centres (Sydney, Melbourne, Brisbane, Perth and Adelaide).

| Week | Episode | Air date | Timeslot | Overnight ratings | | Consolidated ratings | Total ratings | | Source |
| Week | Episode | Air date | Timeslot | Viewers | Rank | Viewers | Viewers | Rank | Source |
|---|---|---|---|---|---|---|---|---|---|
| 1 | 1 | 29 August 2022 | Monday 7:30 pm | 451,000 | 14 | 110,000 | 841,000 | 13 | |
| 1 | 2 | 30 August 2022 | Tuesday 7:30 pm | 316,000 | 16 | 107,000 | 672,000 | 13 | |
| 1 | 3 | 31 August 2022 | Wednesday 7:30 pm | 342,000 | 16 | 124,000 | 719,000 | 14 | |
| 2 | 4 | 4 September 2022 | Sunday 7:30 pm | 315,000 | 10 | 103,000 | 625,000 | 9 | |
| 2 | 5 | 5 September 2022 | Monday 7:30 pm | 386,000 | 16 | 89,000 | 694,000 | 16 | |
| 2 | 6 | 6 September 2022 | Tuesday 7:30 pm | 338,000 | 14 | 74,000 | 612,000 | 13 | |
| 3 | 7 | 11 September 2022 | Sunday 7:30 pm | 319,000 | 9 | 58,000 | 572,000 | 9 | |
| 3 | 8 | 12 September 2022 | Monday 7:30 pm | 353,000 | 18 | 75,000 | 653,000 | 14 | |
| 3 | 9 | 13 September 2022 | Tuesday 7:30 pm | 342,000 | 14 | 60,000 | 613,000 | 13 | |
| 4 | 10 | 18 September 2022 | Sunday 7:30 pm | 291,000 | 10 | 95,000 | 585,000 | 10 | |
| 4 | 11 (Note: Episode 11 aired the same night as the funeral of Queen Elizabeth II – which was broadcast on all other Free to Air primary channels in Australia, as well as on 10's secondary channel, 10 Bold.) | 19 September 2022 | Monday 7:30 pm | 185,000 | >20 | 95,000 | 459,000 | 16 | |
| 4 | 12 | 20 September 2022 | Tuesday 7:30 pm | 286,000 | 18 | 85,000 | 600,000 | 13 | |
| 5 | 13 | 25 September 2022 | Sunday 7:30 pm | 291,000 | 10 | 74,000 | 543,000 | 9 | |
| 5 | 14 | 26 September 2022 | Monday 7:30 pm | 332,000 | 17 | 66,000 | 597,000 | 16 | |
| 5 | 15 | 27 September 2022 | Tuesday 7:30 pm | 326,000 | 16 | 79,000 | 605,000 | 14 | |
| 5 | 16 | 28 September 2022 | Wednesday 7:30 pm | 309,000 | 17 | 93,000 | 595,000 | 14 | |
| 5 | 17 | 29 September 2022 | Thursday 7:30 pm | 292,000 | 16 | 97,000 | 596,000 | 13 | |
| 6 | 18 (Note: Episode 18 aired the same night as 2022 NRL Grand Final.) | 2 October 2022 | Sunday 7:30 pm | 291,000 | 12 | 73,000 | 540,000 | 12 | |
| 6 | 19 | 3 October 2022 | Monday 7:30 pm | 331,000 | 17 | 72,000 | 616,000 | 16 | |
| 6 | 20 | 4 October 2022 | Tuesday 7:30 pm | 308,000 | 16 | 74,000 | 570,000 | 14 | |
| 7 | 21 (Note: The final episode was coded into two programs – "Grand Finale" and "The Finish Line". Because of this, two separate sets of ratings were produced.) | 9 October 2022 | Sunday 7:30 pm | 376,000 | 11 | 51,000 | 628,000 | 12 | |
| 7 | 21 | 9 October 2022 | Sunday 7:30 pm | 438,000 | 9 | 64,000 | 744,000 | 9 | |
