= Gantheaume Point =

Promontory in Western Australia

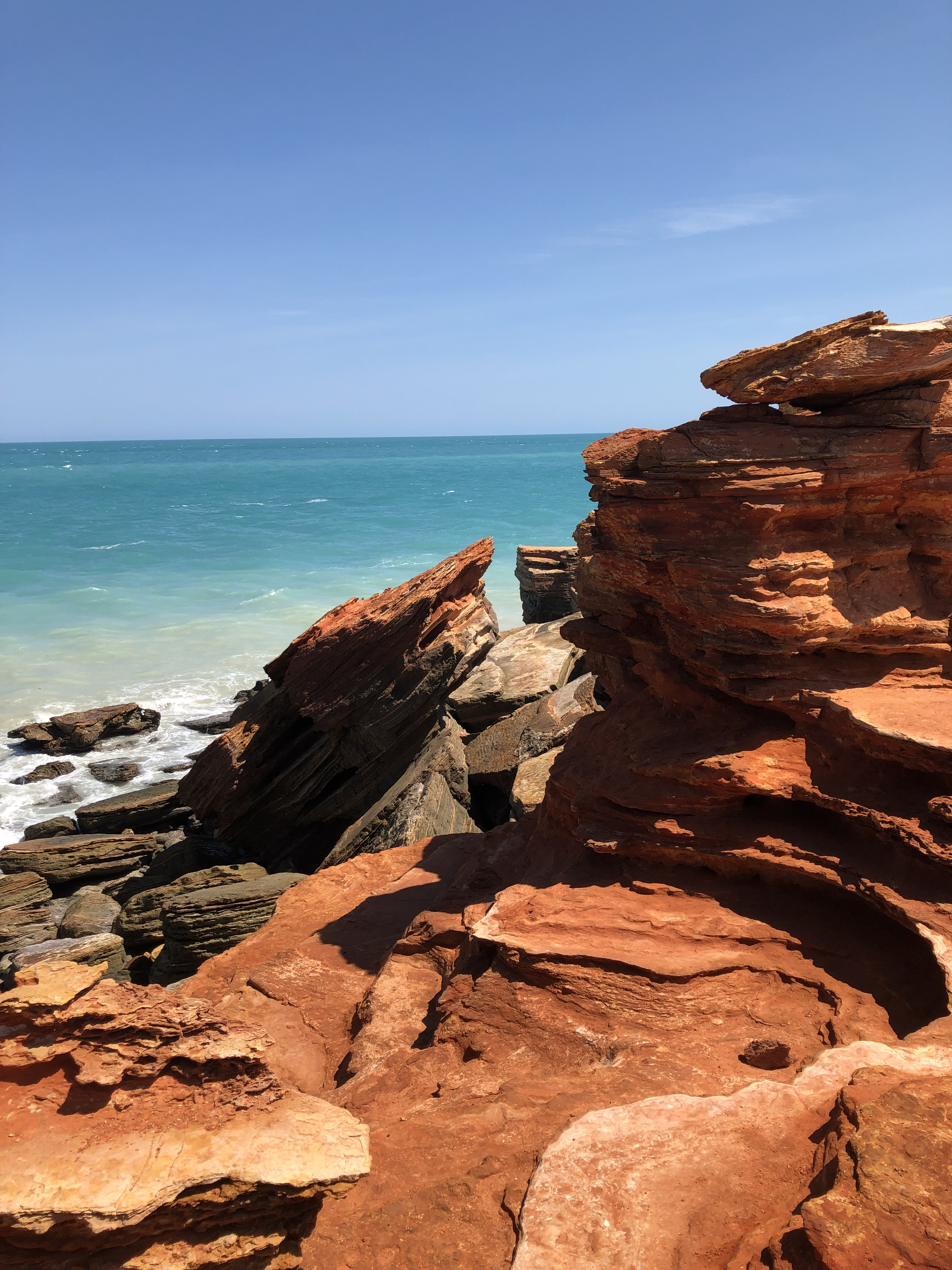
- The Indian Ocean at Gantheaume Point

- Coordinates: 17.9733°S 122.1780°E
- Country: Australia
- State: Western Australia
- Region: Kimberley
- Location: 6 km (3.7 mi) SW of Broome, Western Australia; 1,680 km (1,040 mi) NE of Perth

Gantheaume Point is a promontory about 6 kilometres (3.7 mi) from Broome, Western Australia.

It was named on 24 July 1801 for Honoré Joseph Antoine Ganteaume, by Nicolas Baudin during the Baudin expedition to Australia: this was a French expedition to map the coast of Australia, then known as New Holland.

There are outcrops of Broome Sandstone, deposited in shallow water in this area in the Early Cretaceous period, about 130 million years ago. Footprints from dinosaurs of that time, and plant fossils, are preserved in the sandstone. At very low tide, dinosaur footprints can be seen about 30 metres (98 ft) out to sea.

The mountain top was the finish line on the sixth season of The Amazing Race Australia.

== See also ==
- Anastasia's Pool, a sea bath at the promontory which was destroyed by a storm in 2014
