= Atlas Corporation Studios =

Film studio in Morocco

Coordinates: 30°56′30″N 6°58′0″W

Atlas Corporation Studios استوديوهات أطلس
- Company type: Private
- Industry: Film industry
- Founded: 1983
- Headquarters: Ouarzazate

Atlas Studios is a film studio located 5 kilometres (3.1 mi) west of the city of Ouarzazate in Morocco. Most of the property lies in the nearby desert and mountains. Many sets from the filming of various movies remain in place and, because of this, the studio also operates with guided tours and has become a popular tourist destination.

The company was founded in 1983 by entrepreneur Mohamed Belghmi. Since then it has been able to expand, thanks to reliable climate and weather conditions, and because the area is of a nature that can mimic the natural environments of many countries well.

== Productions ==
Films and TV series that have used the services of the studio include:

- The Jewel of the Nile
- The Living Daylights
- Aladdin
- The Mummy
- Gladiator
- Kingdom of Heaven
- Asterix & Obelix: Mission Cleopatra
- Babel
- Game of Thrones
- Atlantis
- The Amazing Race 10
- The Amazing Race Australia 6
- The Grand Tour
- Vikings
- Prison Break
- The Old Guard
