= Kasbah of Tifoultoute =

Kasbah in Ouarzazate Province, Morocco

- قصبة تيفولتوت
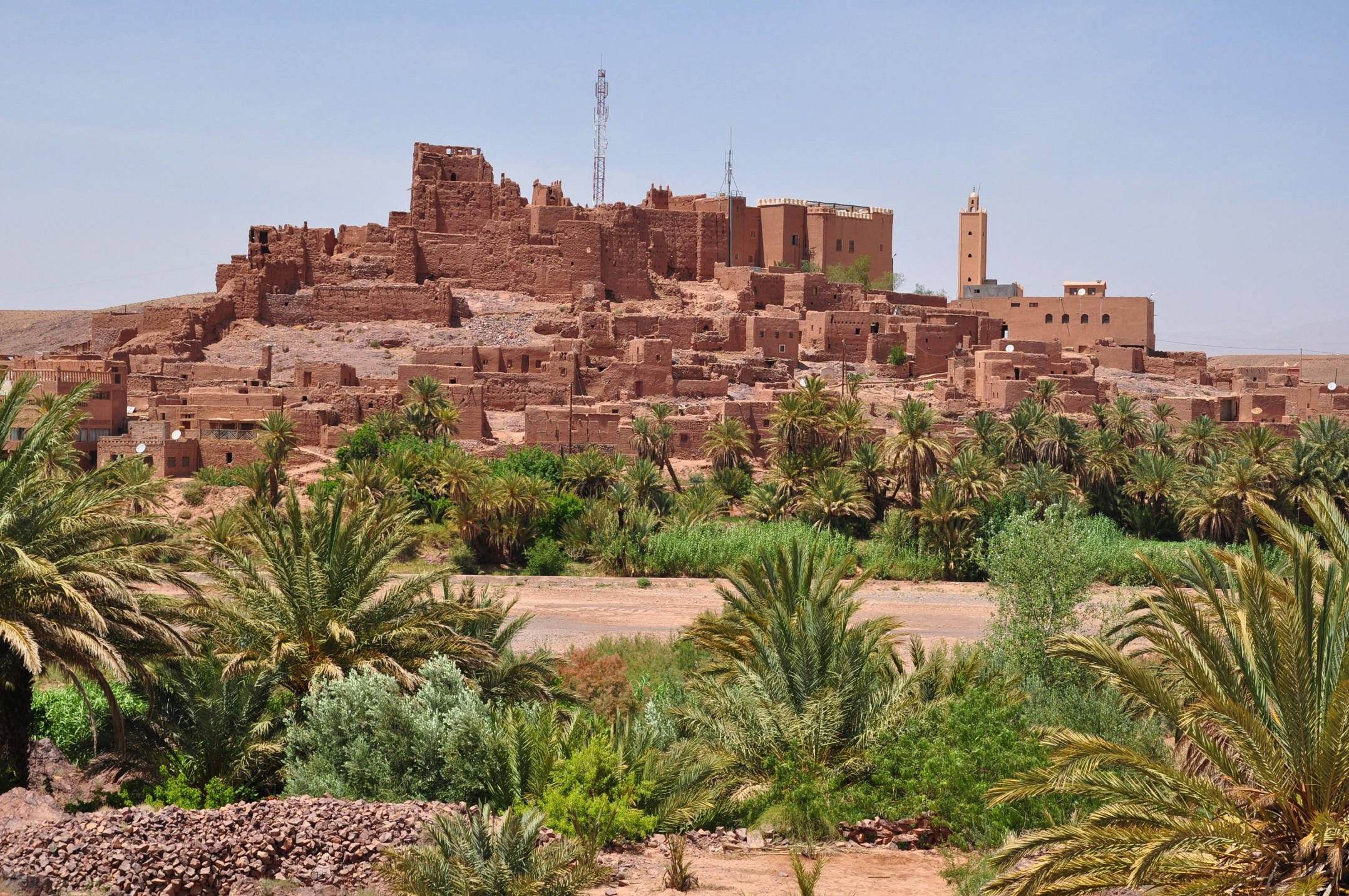
- General view
- Interactive map of the Kasbah of Tifoultoute area

General information
- Location: Ouarzazate, Morocco

The Kasbah of Tifoultoute is a kasbah in Ouarzazate Province, Morocco located 8 kilometres (5 mi) west of the city of Ouarzazate.

== History ==
This fortress belonged to the family of Thami El Glaoui, Pasha of Marrakesh from 1912 to 1956.
