= Baron Bliss Light =

Lighthouse in Belize

Baron Bliss
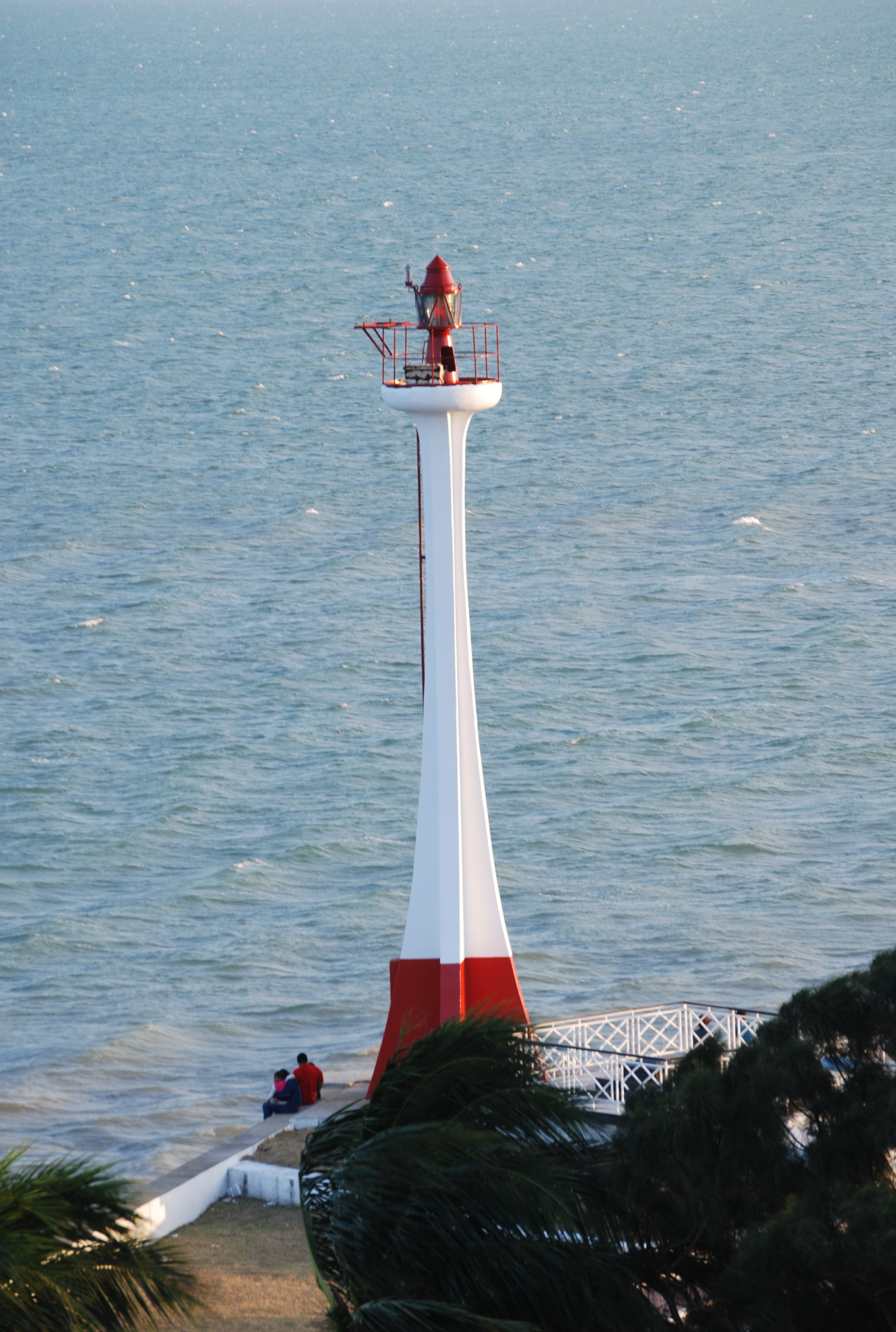
- Baron Bliss Light in Belize City
- Location: Fort George; Belize City; Belize
- Coordinates: 17°29′29.2″N 88°10′53.2″W

Tower
- Constructed: 1885 (first)
- Construction: concrete tower
- Height: 15 metres (49 ft)
- Shape: tapered pillar tower with balcony and no lantern
- Markings: white tower and red band at the base, red balcony

Light
- Focal height: 16 metres (52 ft)
- Range: 8 nmi (15 km; 9.2 mi)
- Characteristic: F R 5s.

Baron Bliss Lighthouse is a lighthouse in Belize City. Established in 1885 on the former site of a Spanish fortress which was extremely damaged after the Battle of St. George's Caye in September 1798, it has a focal plane of 16 m (52 ft) and is painted white and red. It is named after one of Belize's greatest benefactors, Baron Bliss, who is known to have never actually set foot on Belizean shores but was impressed with the people's warm hospitality. He was a sailor and fisherman who traveled the world aboard his yacht the "Sea King". On March 9, 1926, Baron Bliss died leaving instructions that he be buried in a granite tomb near the sea, enclosed with an iron fence with a lighthouse built nearby. This is why this monument was constructed (in remembrance of him) and also at the location where it stands today.

== Uses of the lighthouse ==
The lighthouse, among its main purpose of serving as a traffic warning for boats travelling nearby, has also been used for advertisement purposes as well. It is featured on one of Belikin's most popular alcoholic beverage named "The Lighthouse lager". This in return has placed the lighthouse image on billboards, coasters, cups, mugs and other promotional items around the country of Belize. It is also a major tourist attraction in Belize when it comes to sight seeing and it was listed at #20 of top 53 things to do in Belize on tripadvisor website.

== See also ==
- List of lighthouses in Belize
