= Panagia Episkopi =

Church in Santorini, Greece

- Panagia tis Episkopis (Παναγία της Επισκοπής); Church of Episkopi Thiras (Ναός Επισκοπής Θήρας)
- Παναγία Επισκοπή
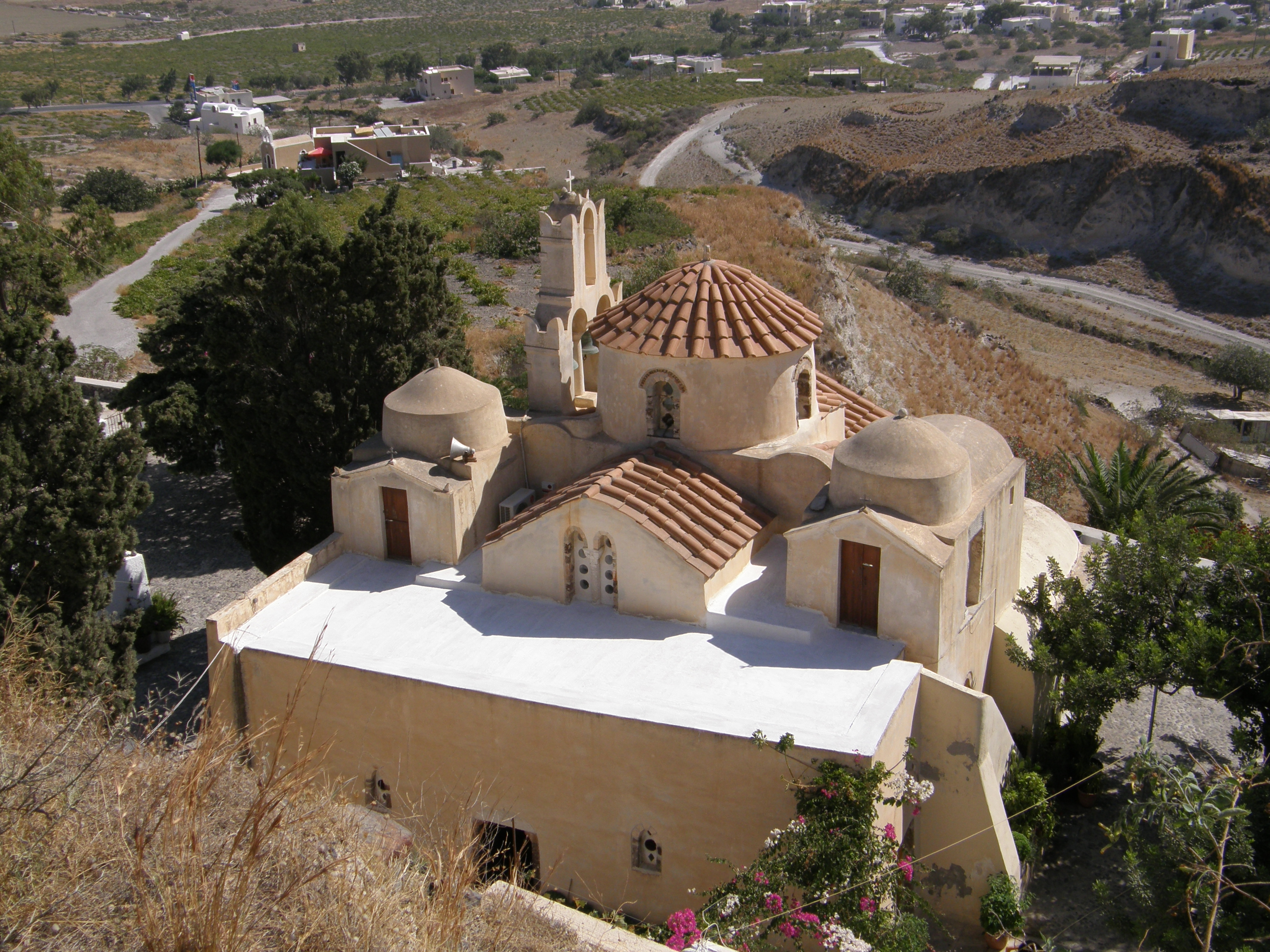
- West side of the church

- Location of the church in Greece
- 36°22′39″N 25°27′51″E
- Location: Mesa Gonia, Santorini
- Country: Greece
- Language: Greek
- Denomination: Greek Orthodox
- Previous denomination: Roman Catholic (1207–1537)

History
- Status: Cathedral: – (c. 11th – c. 12th-centuries–1207); – (1537–1827); Church: – (1207–1537); – (since 1827– )
- Founder: Alexios I Komnenos
- Dedication: Panagia (Virgin Mary)
- Events: Feast of the Assumption

Architecture
- Functional status: Active
- Architectural type: Church
- Style: Byzantine
- Completed: c. 11th – c. 12th-centuries

Specifications
- Length: 14 m (46 ft)
- Width: 11.1 m (36 ft)
- Materials: Stone; tiles; marble; timber

Administration
- Province: Constantinople
- Metropolis: Santorini (it)

The Panagia Episkopi (Greek: Παναγία Επισκοπή) is a middle-Byzantine Greek Orthodox former cathedral, now church, on the island of Santorini (Thira), in the Cyclades region of Greece. It is also called Panagia tis Episkopis (Παναγία της Επισκοπής) or Church of Episkopi Thiras (Ναός Επισκοπής Θήρας). According to an old, now almost completely destroyed inscription, the building of the church was commissioned by the Byzantine Emperor Alexios I Komnenos at the end of the 11th century, and took the place of a previous three-aisled early Byzantine-era basilica. The church was dedicated to the Panagia ("All-holy"), a Greek Orthodox appellation for the Virgin Mary. The second part of the name (Episkopi) means "episcopal". The Panagia Episkopi was the seat of the Orthodox diocese of Santorini until 1207 and again from 1537 to 1827.

== Location ==
The church was built in the northern foothills of the Profitis Ilias (Προφήτης Ηλίας), the highest mountain on Santorini. It is approximately 600 metres (2,000 ft) southeast of the township of Mesa Gonia (Μέσα Γωνιά), which is also referred to as Episkopi Gonias (Επισκοπή Γωνιάς), the name of the previous Episcopal seat. The eastern coast of the island at Kamari (Καμάρι) is approximately 2 kilometres (1.2 mi) from the church, and Fira (Φηρά), the capital of the island, is 5 kilometres (3.1 mi) to the northwest. Mesa Gonia is connected to the Panagia Episkopi via a partially paved road, which ends in a parking area directly north of the church.

== Architecture ==
The Panagia Episkopi is a beige-washed cross-in-square domed church with peripheral structures. The floor plan takes the shape of a Greek cross that is 14 metres (46 ft) long and 11.1 metres (36 ft) wide, and the crossing supports a dome upon a tholobate. The church roof is covered with red tiles or simply plastered. The building has five entrances, two each to the north and the south, and a main entrance to the west.

The east-facing cross-arm of the church contains the altar, and also contains a half-round apse that is recognisable from outside. The apse contains a mullion which, like the two smaller windows next to the apse, is filled with colourful glass bricks. The red, green, yellow and blue glass bricks provide the only exterior light into the chancel, that is otherwise only lit through the opened doors of the iconostasis, or through it from the inner part of the church. North of the chancel, at the northeast side of the building, is a narrow bell-gable with four bells that can be rung from outside using bell ropes.

On the flat roof of the western annex, accessible from a narrow staircase on the south, there are two chapels. They were completed over the entrance hall during the early 20th century, and were dedicated to the prophet Daniel and Gregory of Nazianzus.

Due to the addition of annexes, the interior of the Panagia Episkopi has a number of larger and smaller rooms, which gives the church a labyrinthine appearance. The floor is covered with marble tiles of various sizes. A relatively low synthronon is integrated into the apse. In front of the west side of the central church area there is an entrance hall (narthex), that extends the full width of the church. Originally there were, besides the main entrance in the western wall of the church, two side entrances; one to the North and one to the south. The southern part of the narthex was, however, separated from the interior part of the church, and now exists as a small secondary room, and is only accessible from outside, through the southern entrance. In the southeast, the interior corner of the cross shape is filled out by an annex, which was built in 1767 to settle a dispute between Roman and Orthodox Christians, and was broken through to the chancel, so that it could serve as a chapel for the Roman Catholics of the island.

Exterior views of the church
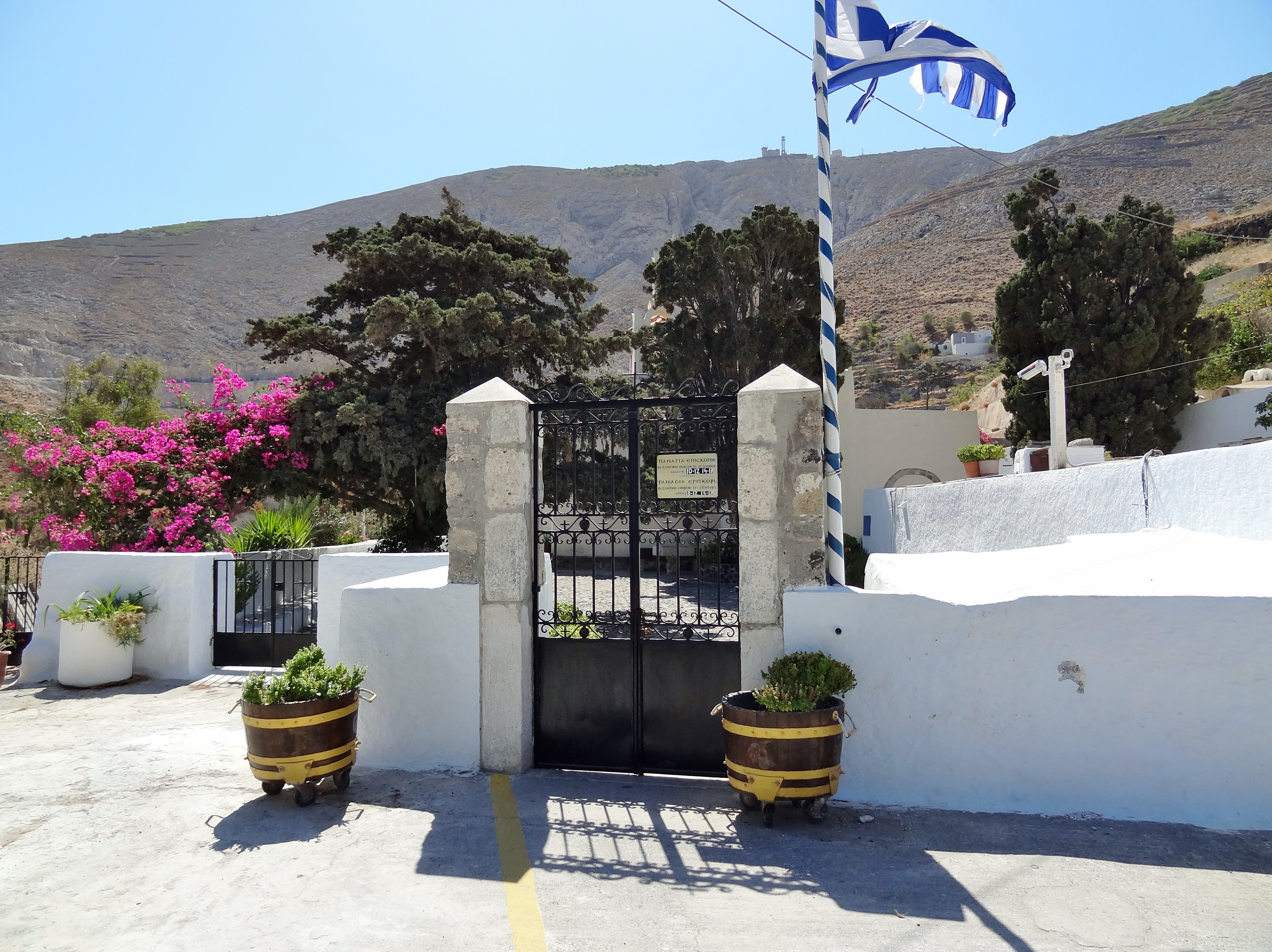
Entrance to the church grounds

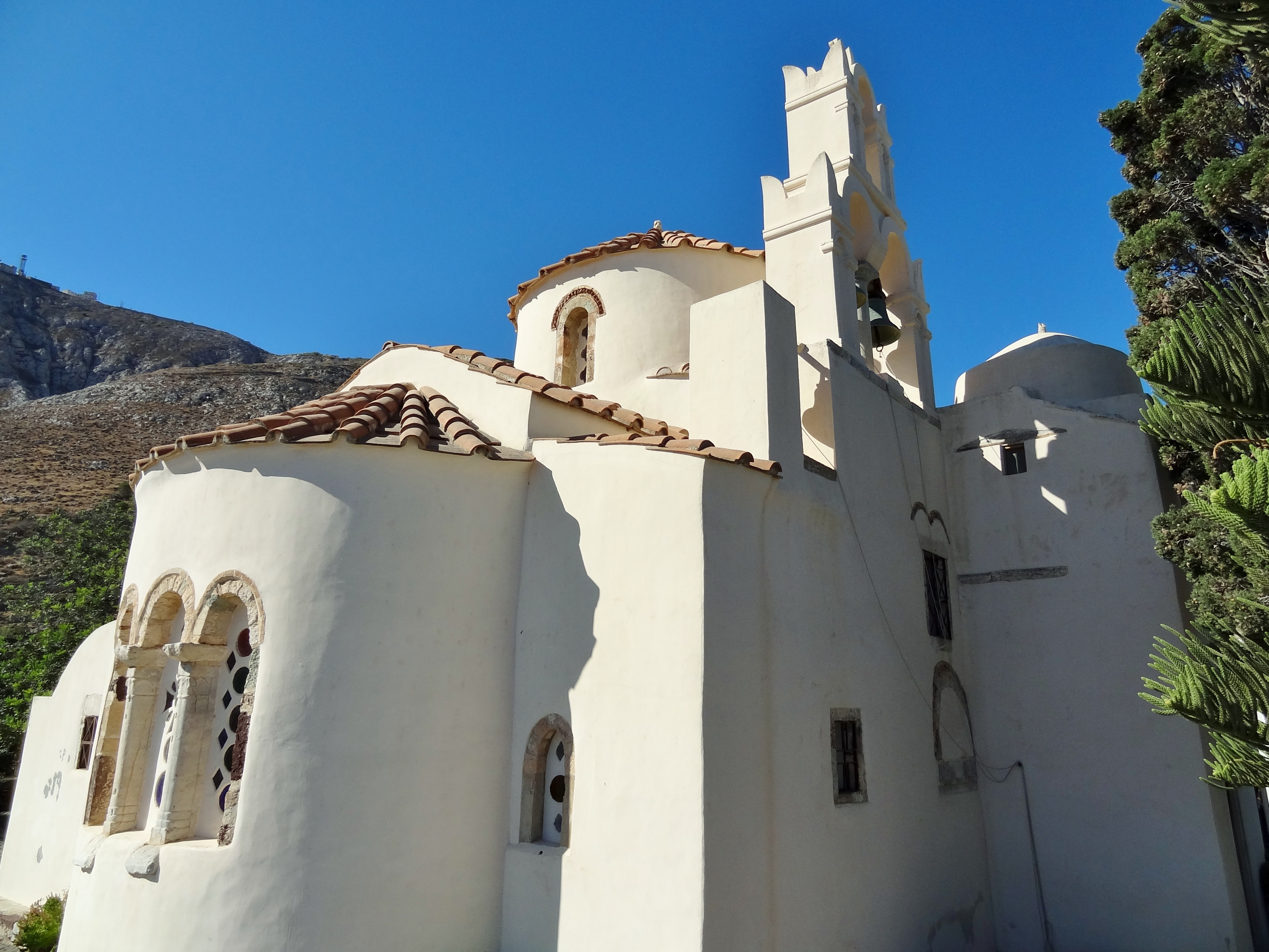
North-east aspect with apse

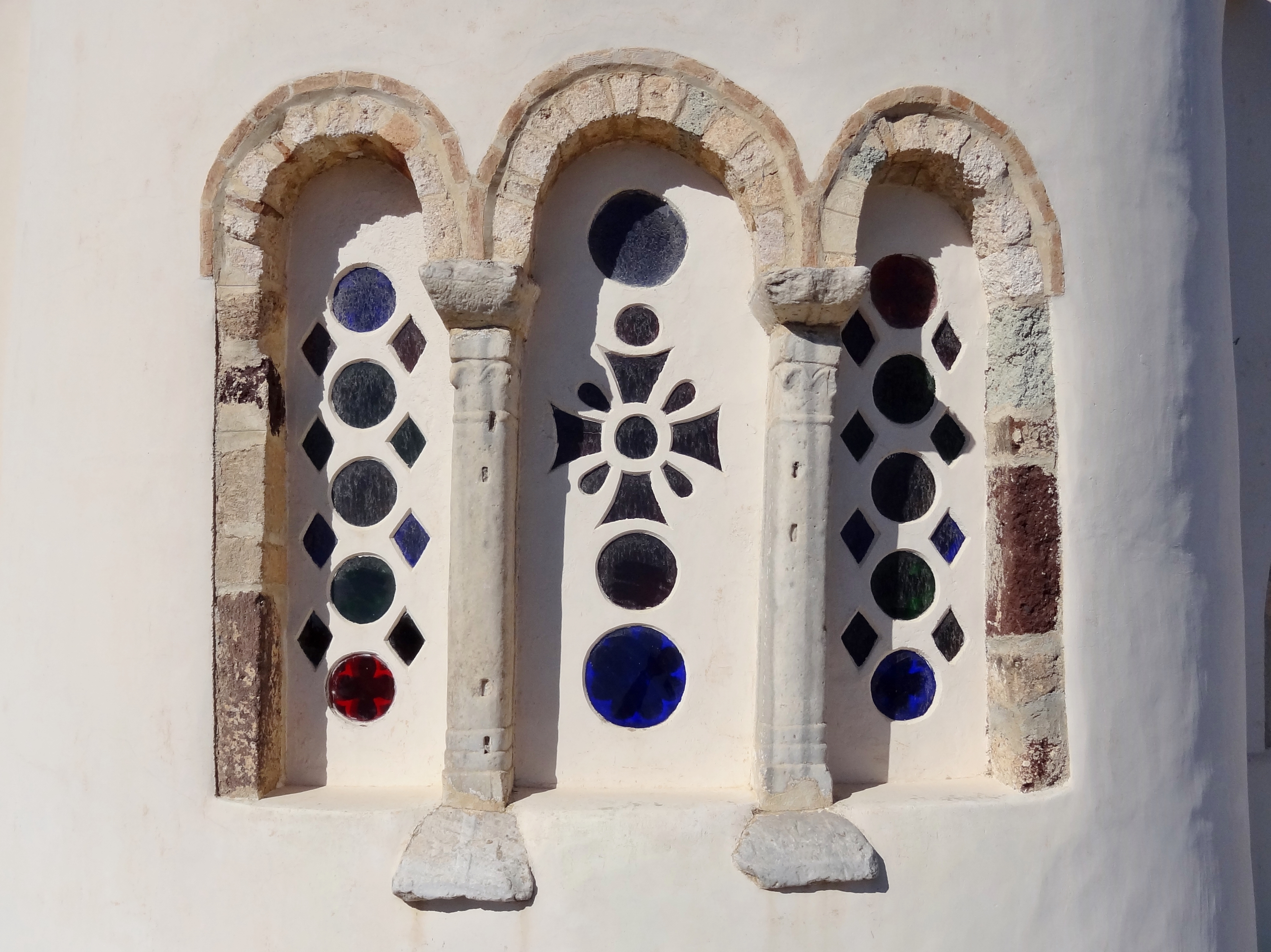
Mullion on the apse

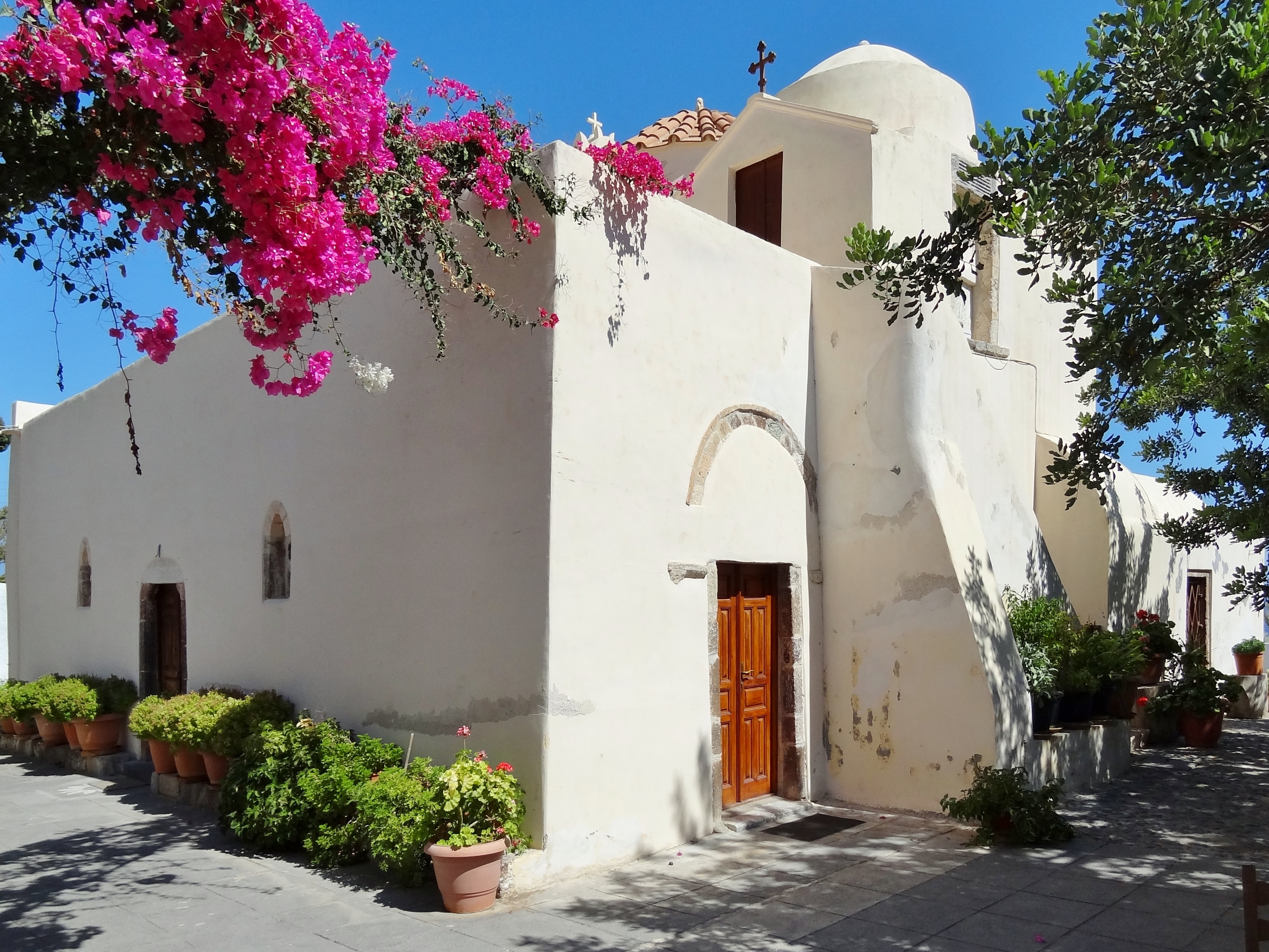
Southwest view of the entrance hall

=== Furnishing ===
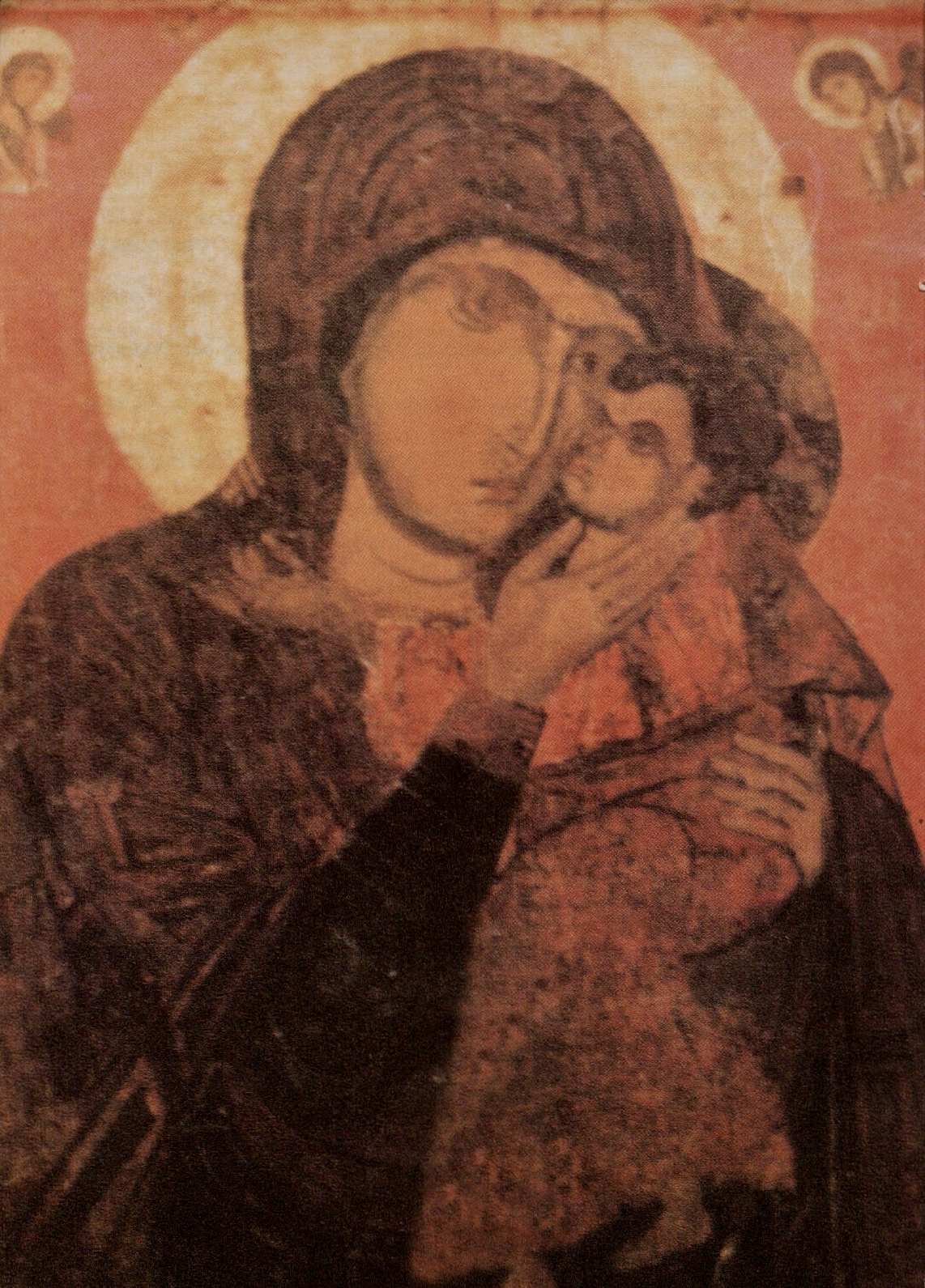
Icon of the Panagia Glykofilousa

Various icon stands are lined up along the walls of the inner room. The best known and most valuable icon in the church is that of the Panagia Glykofilousa (Παναγιά Γλυκοφιλούσα – "sweetly kissing Madonna"), dated to the 12th century.

==== Iconostasis ====
The iconostasis, which separates the eastern end of the main hall of the church from the chancel (called the "bema" in Orthodox tradition), is notable for its brilliantly multicoloured effect. It has the usual five-part structure. The lower part consists of the original furnishings from the construction of the church around 1100. The upper part consists of an engraved wooden post-Byzantine architrave, a frieze with fourteen icons and a carved top. The variety of ornaments is considered unique in the middle-Byzantine era, with links to the 6th century and to churches in Constantinople, Venice and Ravenna.

The central passage, called the Holy Door, is closed with an almost chest-high double door. The door panels display valuable wood carvings from the 17th century with floral motifs and two dragons as an upper finishing for the design. Each is painted with an apostle: Saint Peter to the left, and Paul the Apostle to the right.

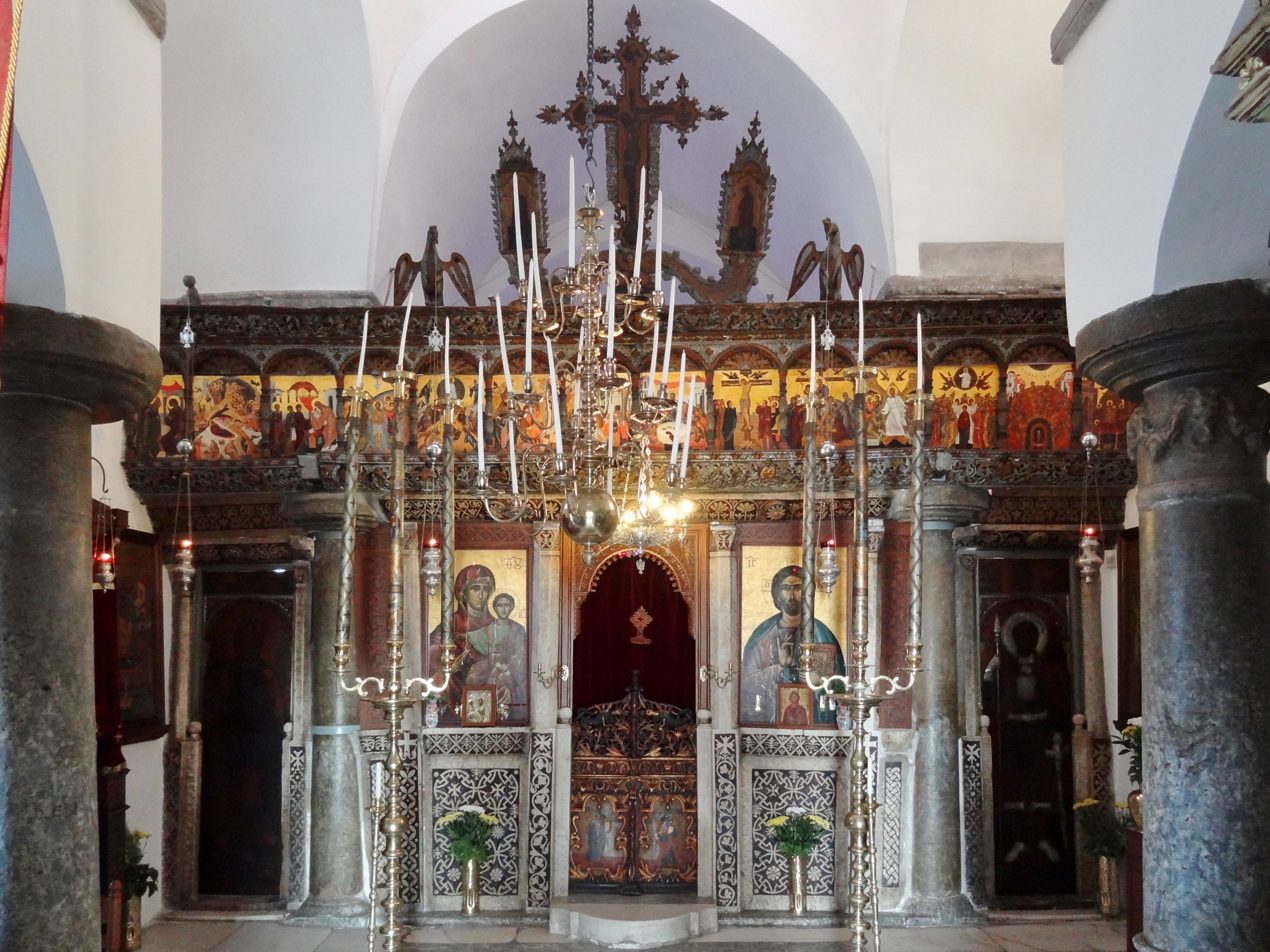
Iconostasis in the central inner chamber

To left and right of the central door are two permanently installed fields consisting of upright flat marble slabs inlaid with an unusual intarsia technique, with geometric and floral motifs cut into the marble in relief. The pictures are from the Arab tradition and are supplemented by small birds, swastikas, flowers, palmettes and leaves. The wells of the reliefs were originally filled with a red, now darkened mass of wax and mastic. In the same technique, marble inlays are also mounted on the pillar trim, connecting panels and the door lintels. Two icons are also embedded above the lintels. On the left side of the door, the Panagia is depicted with the Child Jesus. To the right of the central door is the Christ Pantocrator with the right hand in a sign of blessing and the left holding a closed Evangelion. These two icons are modern creations which took the place of 17th-century icons that were stolen in 1982.

The northern and southern portals to the chancel, apart from the load-bearing pillars, are covered with man-sized icons of the archangel Gabriel (left) and Saint Menas (right). The icon of Menas is partially inlaid with silverwork. The wooden top was created in the 18th century by local artists. It shows an architrave with different motifs, including grapes and birds. A frieze is cut into it, housing fourteen modern icons showing scenes from the life of Christ. The original 17th-century icons showing feasts from the lives of Jesus and Mary were lost in the same theft as the other icons which were stolen in 1982.

The multiplicity of the decorations of the iconostasis serves as a reminder of the traditions of the golden age of Constantinople. They represent an attempt to draw together elements from all Constantinopolitan styles "with a certain nostalgia". This leads to a kind of Neo-Justinianism, but transformed into a characteristically Greek style through the technique of marble intarsia.

==== Frescoes ====
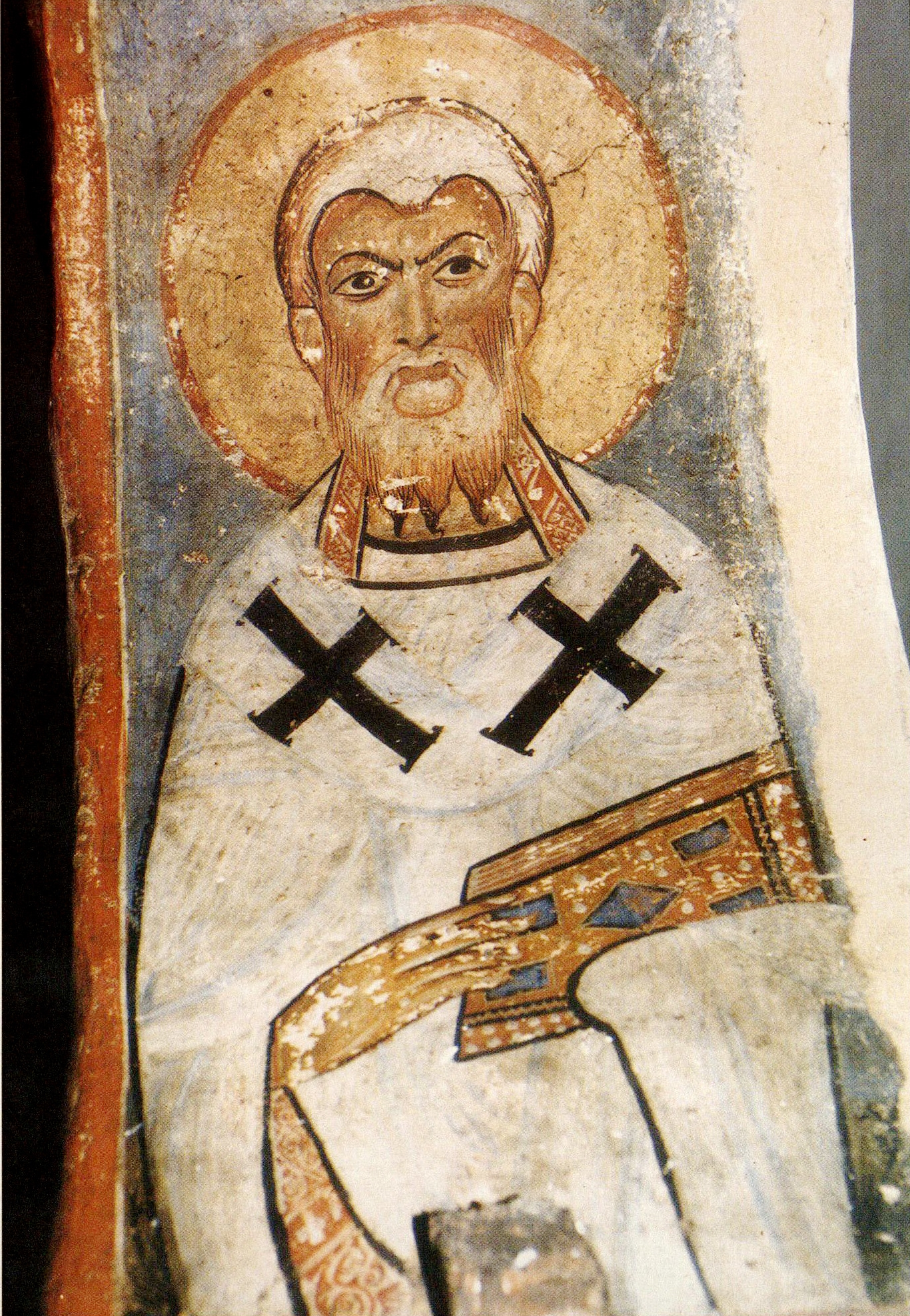
A Hierarch, probably Athanasius the Great (fresco in the chancel)

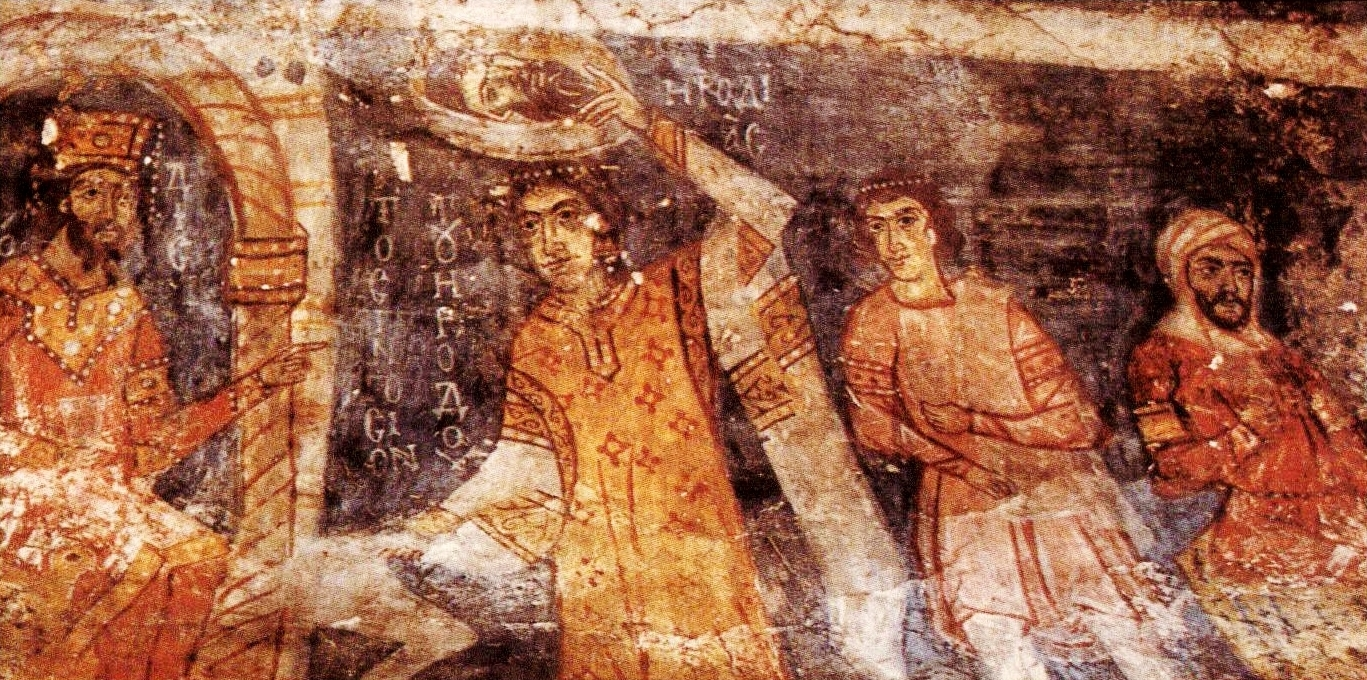
Fresco of the feast at Herod II

The inner room of the Panagia Episkopi was decorated with frescoes during its construction. They were covered with plaster during the Ottoman era. Over the course of the centuries, most of them were destroyed by moisture. Some of the frescoes were successfully freed from the plaster and restored, however. The figures in the pictures are reminiscent of Cappadocian murals, which led the Greek construction researcher and Byzantinologist Anastasios Orlandos to conclude that the artist was of eastern origin. He dated the frescoes to 1100. The frescoes show various Hierarchs, Christian martyrs and scenes from the life of Christ as well as other biblical scenes.

The Festival of Herod II stands out among the scenic representations. The fresco shows the king on his throne, pointing at his wife, Herodias, as she presents him with the head of John the Baptist on a platter. Further scenes show the Miracles of Jesus, the Resurrection, and the birth and death of the Virgin Mary. All these paintings are outstanding due to their lively expression and harmonious colouration.

=== Construction archeology ===
At the site of the church, prior to its construction, there was a three-nave early Christian basilica. There are references to its creation as a monastery church, which Friedrich Hiller von Gaertringen already pursued in 1900. Due to frequent rebuilding activities, however, no archaeological evidence remains of the monastery. Walls and other elements of the preexisting buildings were used in the church, among others the four strong pillars which carry the central dome, as well as part of the eastern wall, left and right of the apse. The current dividing wall between the nave and the narthex was in fact the original western wall of the basilica. The entrance to the nave, with marble doorposts, was the entrance of the original building. The larger entrance on the northern side was probably reused as spolia. Various parts of the building show evidence of the use of spolia from ancient Thera, a city on the Mesa Vouno, a foothill of the Profitis Ilias. Among these are the Doric pillars with capitals and bases, a number of architraves, round altars and carved bull heads.

Interior of the church
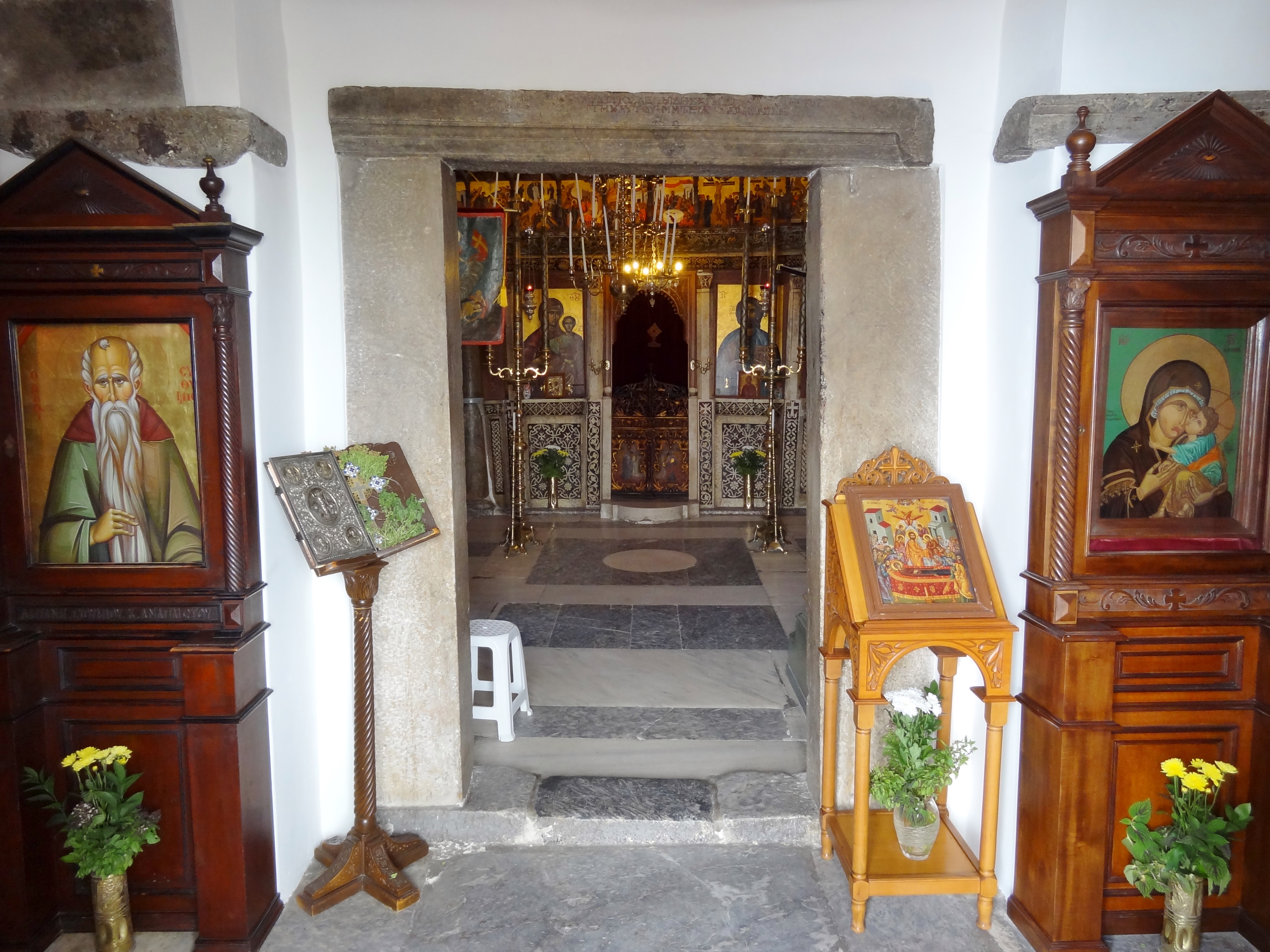
Entrance to the church from the western main entrance

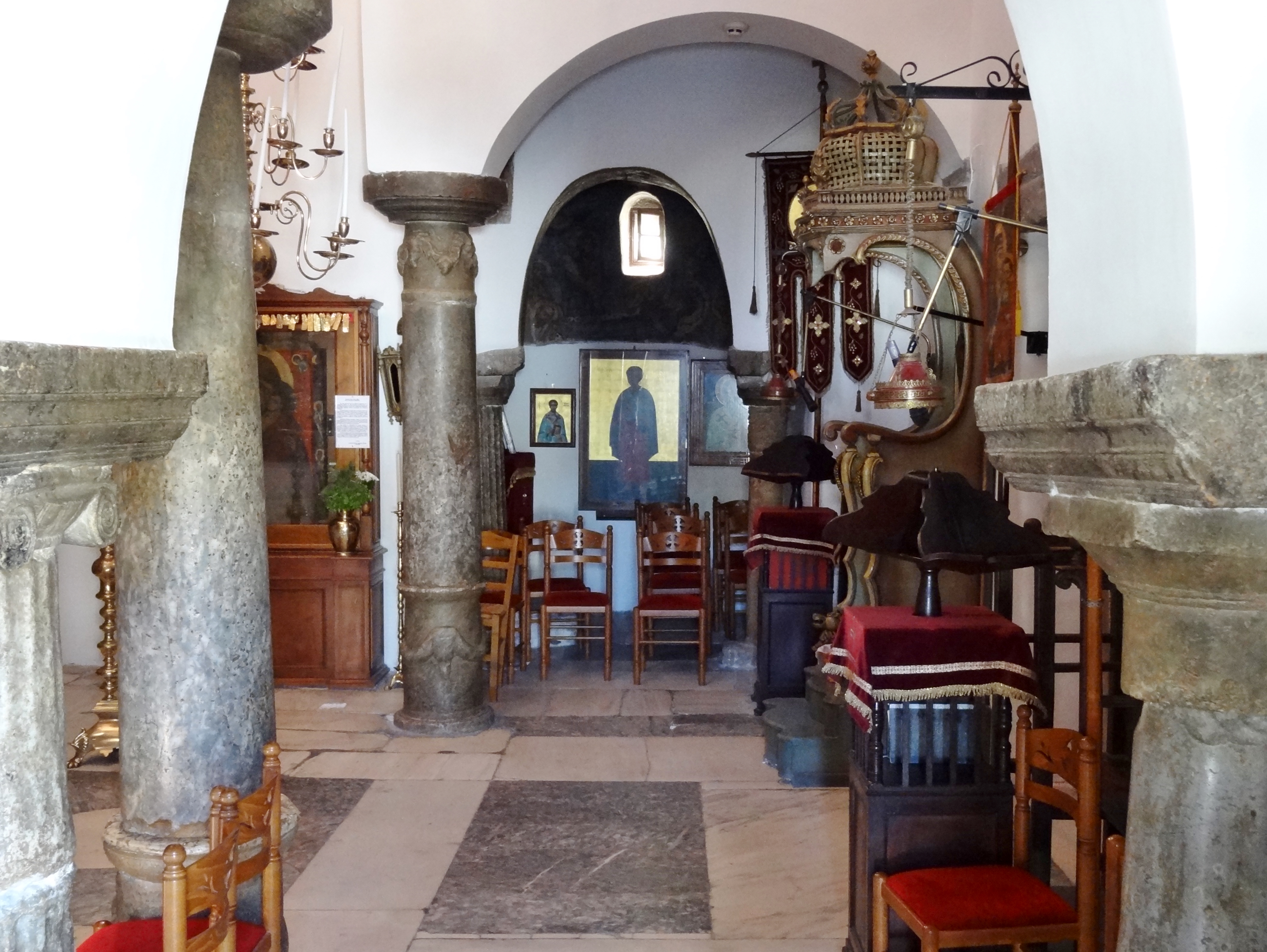
View towards the south wing with frescoes

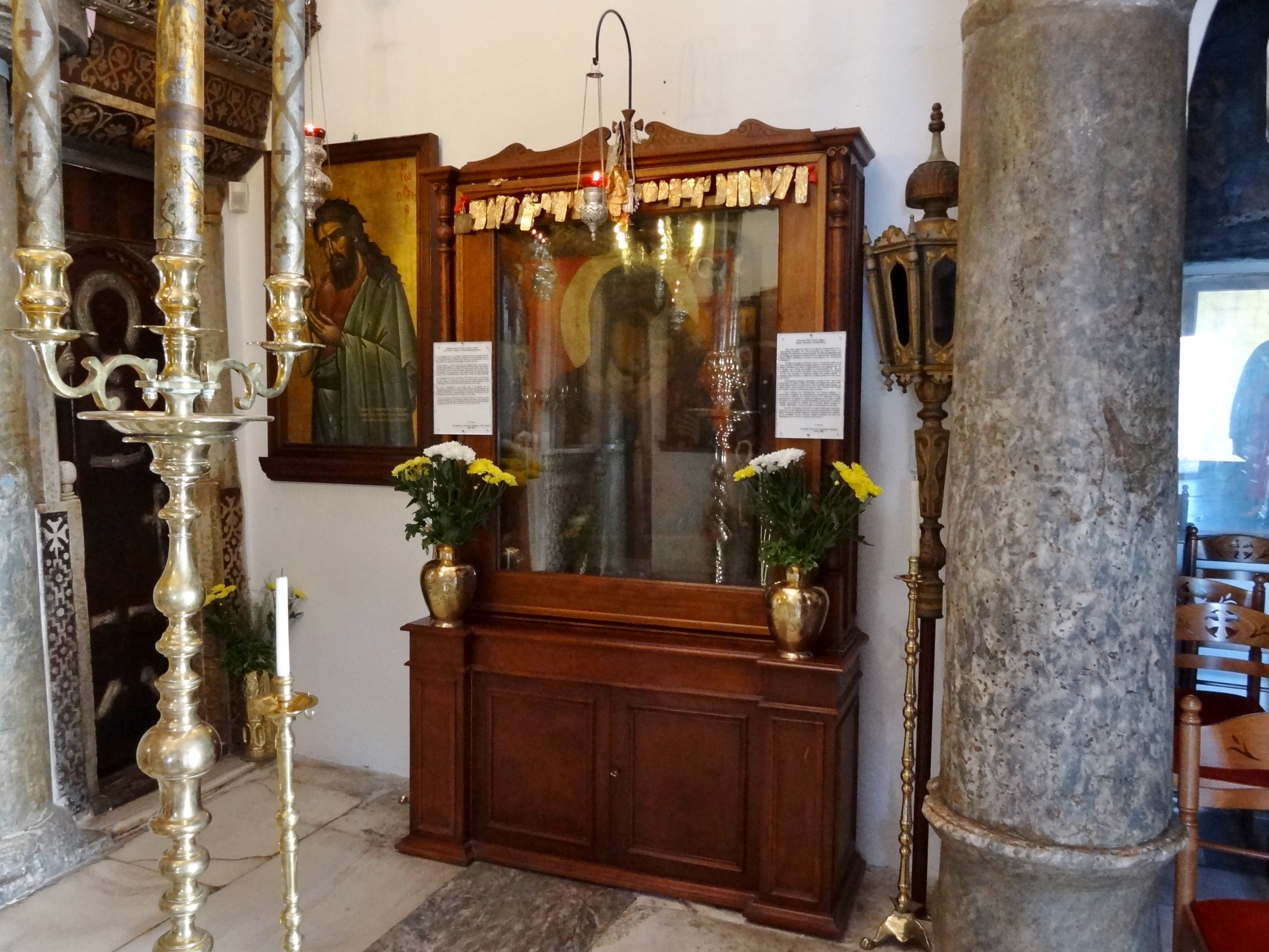
Icon stands of the Panagia Glykofilousa

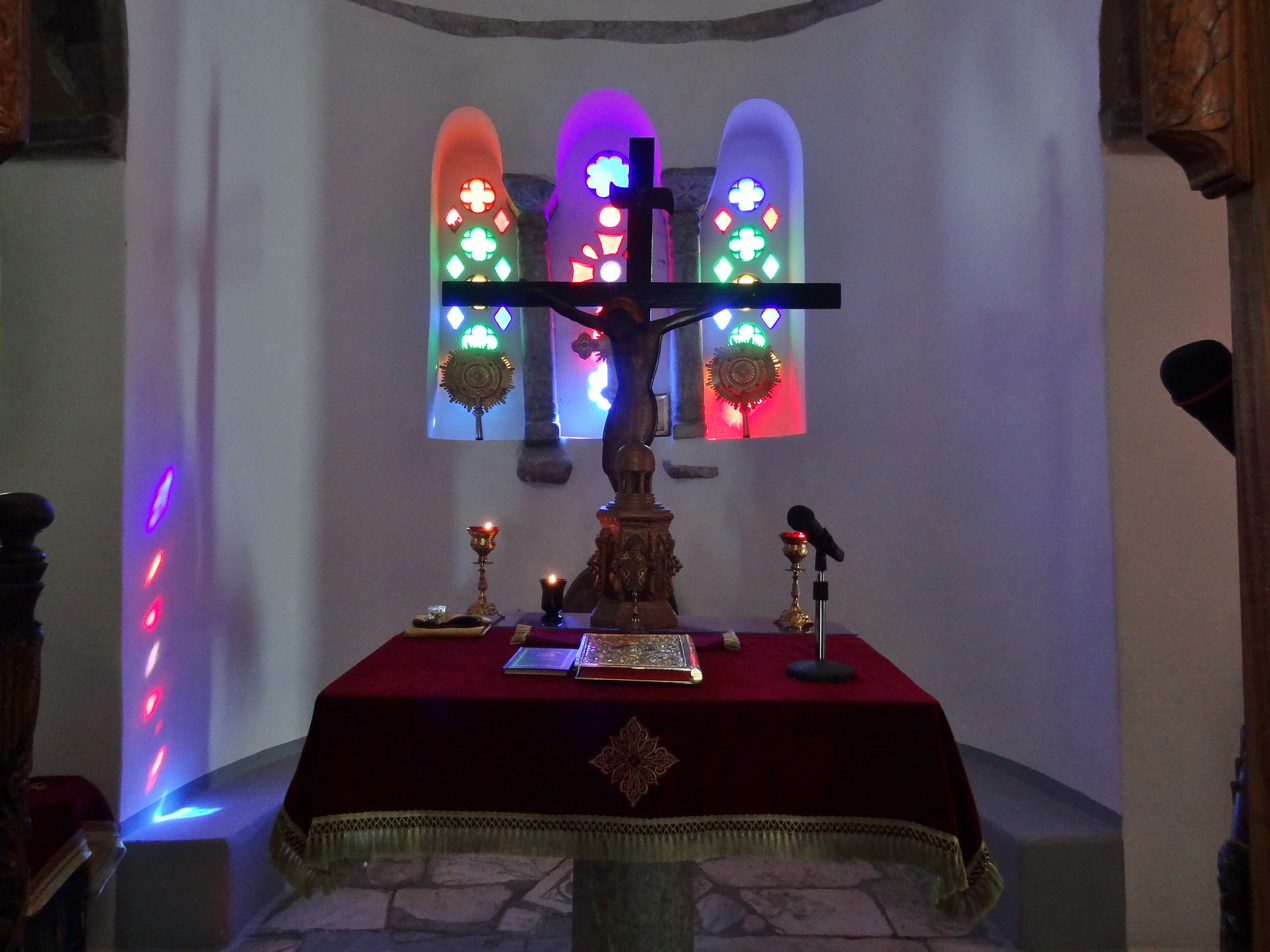
Chancel with window in the eastern apse.

=== Use ===
Since 1931, the Panagia Episkopi has been the central sanctuary of the island of Santorini. Since 1962, it has been a protected monument. Each year on the 15th of August, the original cathedral is the center of the feast of the Assumption or Dormition of the Holy Virgin (Η Κοίμηση της Θεοτόκου), the most important celebration of the Virgin Mary in the Greek Orthodox Church. During this feast, the icons of the church are carried around the church in procession. In memory of the former estates of the church, a dish with a puree of sweet peas and beans is presented to all the faithful after the service.

== History ==
An origin myth relates that an icon from a chapel dug into a nearby cliff, repeatedly vanished without any observable cause, to be found on a volcanic hill, the site of the current chapel. The faithful took this as a sign that the icon did not wish to remain in the underground chapel, and wanted to be placed in a free-standing church.

In 1701 a further legend was recorded, relating that the Byzantine Emperor Alexios I Komnenos (1048–1118) presented the church with a deed to the entire land outside the former villages of Gonia and Pyrgos Kallistis up to the top of the highest mountain of the island. According to the legend, his wife Irene Doukaina also donated a large sum of money. A decree in the form of a Chrysobull was attached to the deeds, with a picture of the church on the seal. No such deed or seal has been found to date.

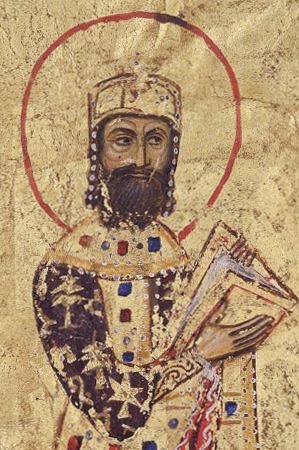
Byzantine Emperor Alexios I Komnenos, possible donor of the church

There is a demonstrable reference to Emperor Alexios in the now largely destroyed inscription, in Greek: Ἀλέξιος ἐν Χῶ τῶ Θῶ αὐτοκράτωρ Ρωμαίων ὁ Κομνινὸς καì πιστὸς βασιλεύς, lit. 'Alexios in Christ the God [faithful], autokrator of the Romans, the Komnenos and pious basileus') over the inside of the main entrance. There is also a fresco with a portrait of the Emperor, which dates from the 16th century and is hence not contemporary, and is moreover badly damaged. There is a debate in the literature about whether the Alexios in question might not be Alexios II Komnenos, who ruled from 1180 until 1183. The motifs in the marble intarsia provide some support for this theory, particularly the representation of birds and the frequent use of crosses are typical of illustrated manuscripts from the time of Alexios II. Evidence to the contrary comes from the fact that Alexios I demonstrably pursued a program of church building, and that neighbouring islands have churches that have been dated to the time of his rule. Therefore, the foundation of the church before the emperor's death in 1118 is not excluded; various local texts that specify exact dates, are from the 19th century and probably have no factual basis.

The recorded history of the church begins in 1207, when the island of Santorini became part of the Duchy of the Archipelago, controlled by the Venetian Republic, following the Fourth Crusade. The Venetians expelled the Orthodox bishop from the island and installed a Roman Catholic bishop in his place. The Panagia Episkopi was proclaimed as the seat of the displaced bishop in this context. While his Latin replacement took a seat in Skaros at the edge of the crater, a Latin altar was erected next to the Orthodox one at Panagia Episkopi.

When the island along with the rest of the Aegean was captured in 1537 by Hayreddin Barbarossa for the Ottoman Empire, the Orthodox bishop returned and again assumed the Panagia Episkopi as his seat. The Roman Catholics of the island did not accept this, especially due to the valuable estates of the church and the agricultural and other yields of the lands. The dispute escalated, and both parties took to arms, so that the conflict was brought to the attention of both the Patriarch Neophytos II and Sultan Ahmed I. Under pressure from these two leaders, the parties were able to reach a settlement whereby the church lands were shared, and both confessions were able to hold services in the church.

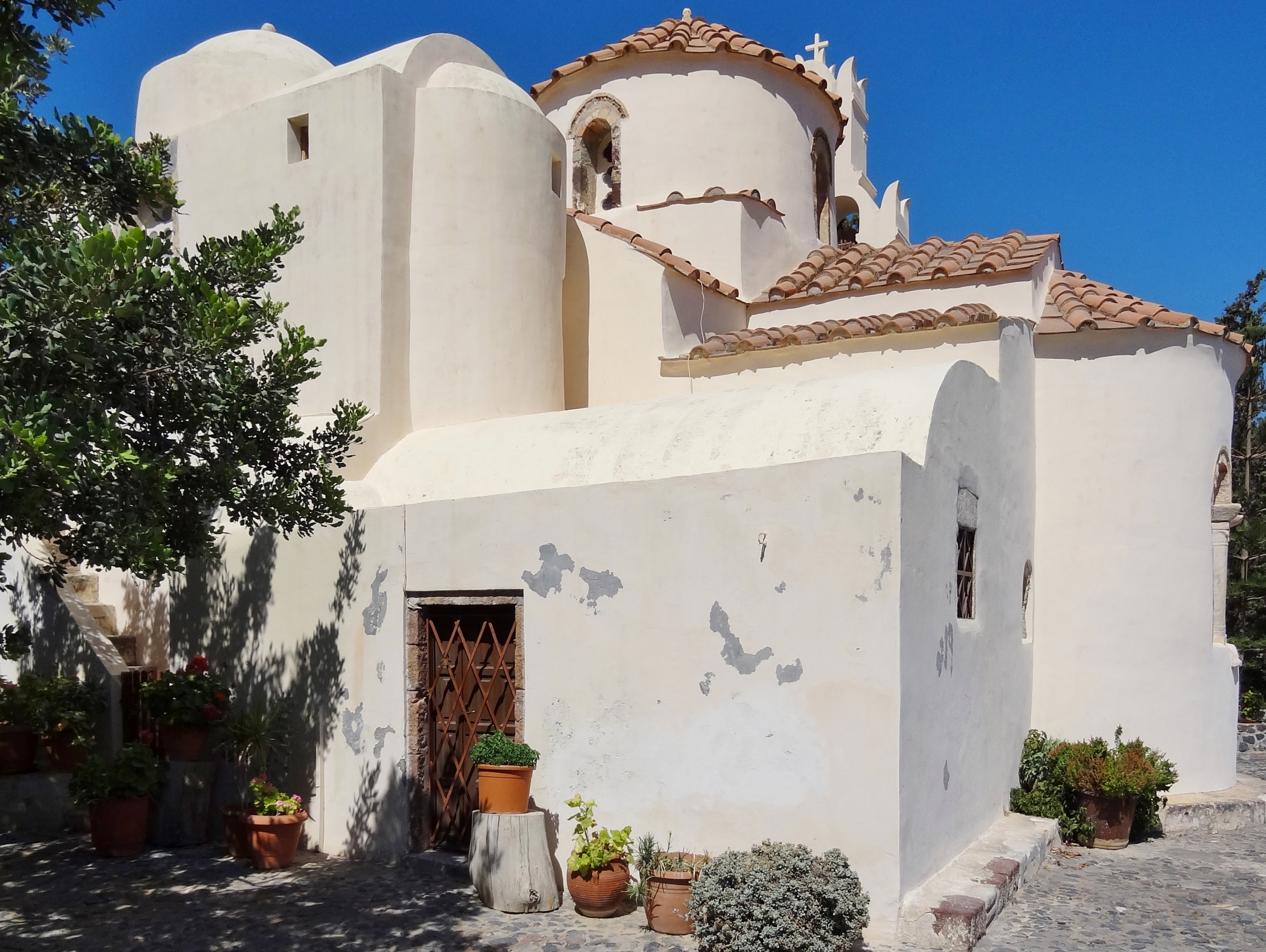
Latin chapel at the south-east side of the church

In later years, the dispute between the Orthodox and Catholic islanders flared up again. The new dispute was centered around the Feast of the Assumption, namely who would have the first service on the previous day, and who would celebrate the main liturgy on the feast day itself. The conflict intensified until 1758, when Patriarch Cyril V of Constantinople decreed that all Orthodox Christians who shared a church with Catholics, would be excommunicated. Sultan Mustafa III issued a firman (decree) transferring the church to the Orthodox community. The Catholics ignored this decree, feeling secure in the protection of the Western ambassadors in Constantinople, and continued to celebrate Mass in the church. In 1767, the Patriarch and Sultan issued a new decree, requiring the Catholics to erect an annex to the church, which would be dedicated to their services. In the same year, a small room with a barrel vault was built onto the southeast part of the church. It can be reached through a door on the southern wall, and is broken through to the chancel, which houses both the Orthodox and the Roman Catholic altars.

Apart from the 1614 separation of the grounds between the two confessions, the upper part of the church grounds, including the peak of the Profitis Ilias and two small chapels on the mountain, was handed over to two brothers on the island, who founded the monastery of the Prophet Elijah, that stands there until today. In 1827, the new church in Fira, the main city on the island, was inaugurated, and the episcopal seat moved there. After the creation of the Kingdom of Greece in 1832, the property of the church was diminished step by step. Starting in 1850, the church sold its remaining lands, with the last vineyards being sold in 1902.

In 1915, a fire in the Panagia Episkopi destroyed the major part of the books, church documents and priestly robes. The icons of the church, however, survived without damage. The 1956 Amorgos earthquake, which destroyed large parts of the Mesa Gonias, caused severe damage to the church buildings. Subsequently, the inhabitants of Mesa Gonia founded the coastal town of Kamari beneath the traditional town. The reconstruction and fundamental restoration of the church continued until 1986. During the work in 1982, all 26 portable icons were stolen, among which were three framed frescoes, which were separated from the walls. They have never been discovered.

== See also ==
- Roman Catholicism in Greece
- Church of Greece
- List of churches in Greece
