= Episkopi Gonias =

Village and community on the island of Santorini, Greece

Episkopi Gonias Επισκοπή Γωνιάς
- Community
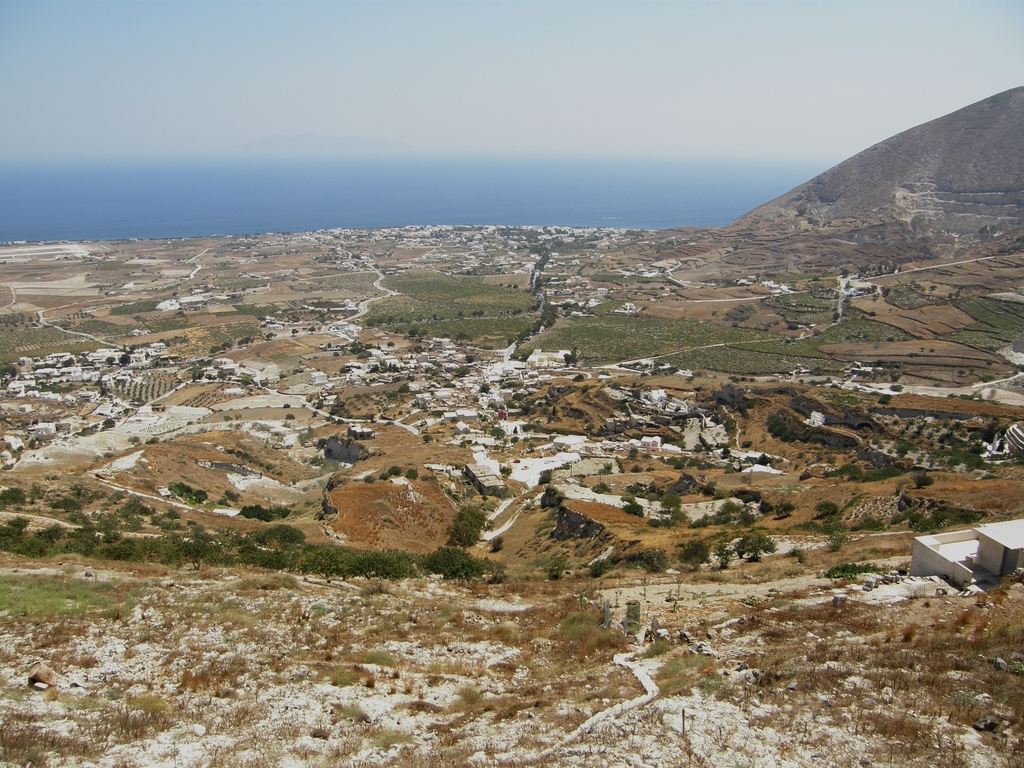

- Location within Greece
- Coordinates: 36°23′06″N 25°27′35″E
- Country: Greece
- Administrative region: South Aegean
- Regional unit: Thira
- Municipality: Thira
- Municipal unit: Thira

Population (2021)
  - Community: 1,252
- Time zone: UTC+2 (EET)
  - Summer (DST): UTC+3 (EEST)

Episkopi Gonias (Greek: Επισκοπή Γωνιάς) also Mesa Gonia (Greek: Μέσα Γωνιά) is a village and a community on the island of Santorini in Greece, located 6 km southeast of the capital Fira. The village is built on the foothills of Profitis Ilias mountain and had 187 inhabitants according to the 2021 census. Episkopi Gonias was almost entirely destroyed by an earthquake in 1956. As a result, most of its dwellers moved near the coast and built the village of Kamari. Today, Episkopi Gonias and Kamari comprise the community (Δημοτική Κοινότητα) of Episkopi Gonias with a total population of 1,252 (2021).

The village derives its name from Panagia Episkopi, a nearby 11th century Byzantine church which used to be the seat of the Orthodox diocese of Santorini.
