= Ancient Thera =

Ancient city on Santorini island

Coordinates: 36°21′52.51″N 25°28′40.58″E

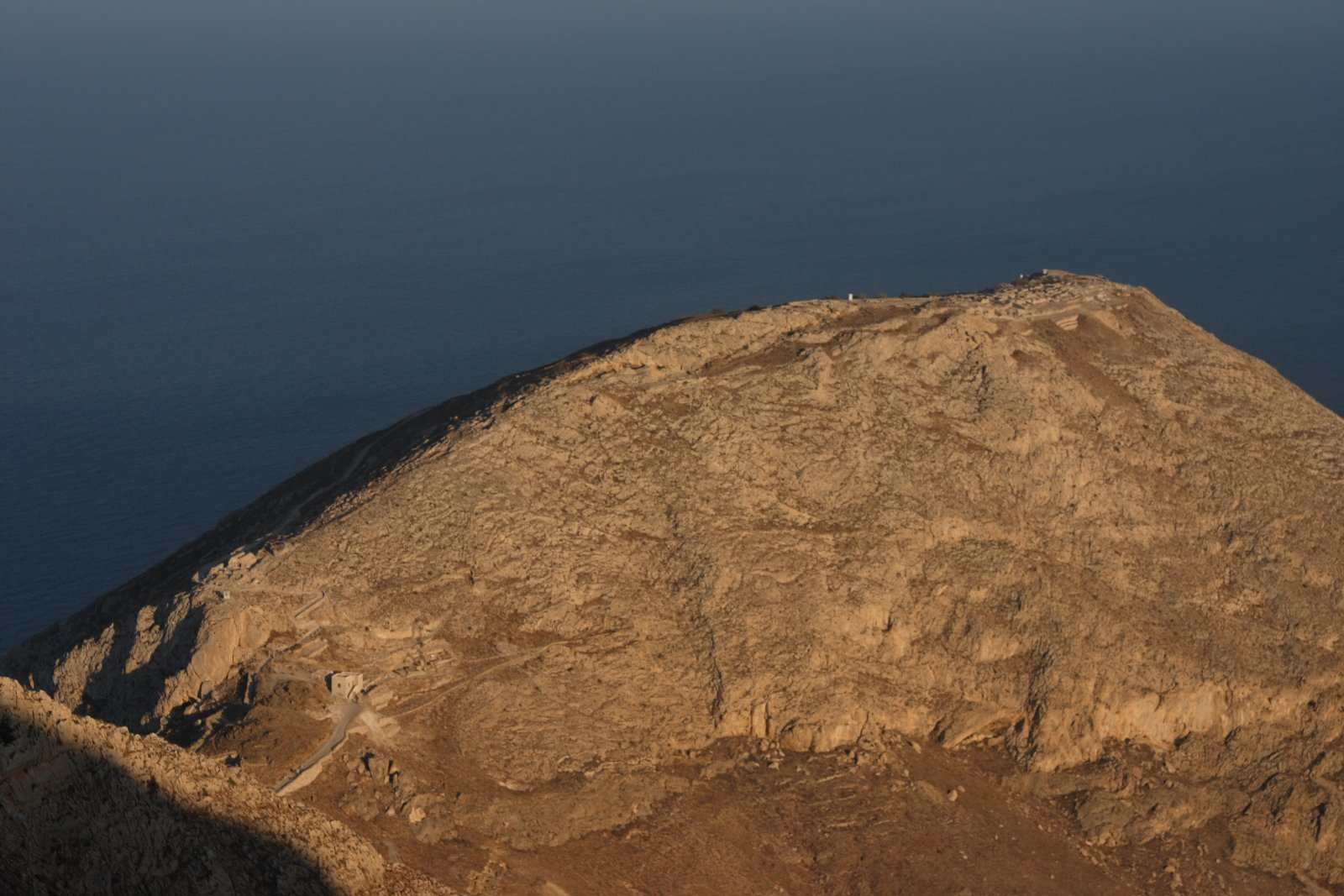
A view of the mountaintop ruins of Ancient Thera from Mt. Elias.

Ancient Thera (Greek: Αρχαία Θήρα) is an archaeological site from classical antiquity on the island of Santorini, which sits on the top of a limestone hill called Mesa Vouno. Starting in 1895, Friedrich Hiller von Gaertringen systematically investigated the city until 1904. Later excavations by N. Zapheiropoulos between 1961 and 1982, under the auspices of the Archaeological Society of Athens, unearthed the city's necropolis in Sellada. Findings from these excavations are on exhibit at the archaeological museum in Fira. Excavation work continued between 1990 and 1994 under the leadership of Wolfram Hoepfner of the Free University of Berlin and resulted in a more precise understanding of the history of the southern Aegean.

Ancient Thera is open to the public and can be reached on a winding road that starts at Kamari or several footpaths from both sides of the mountain.

== Geography ==
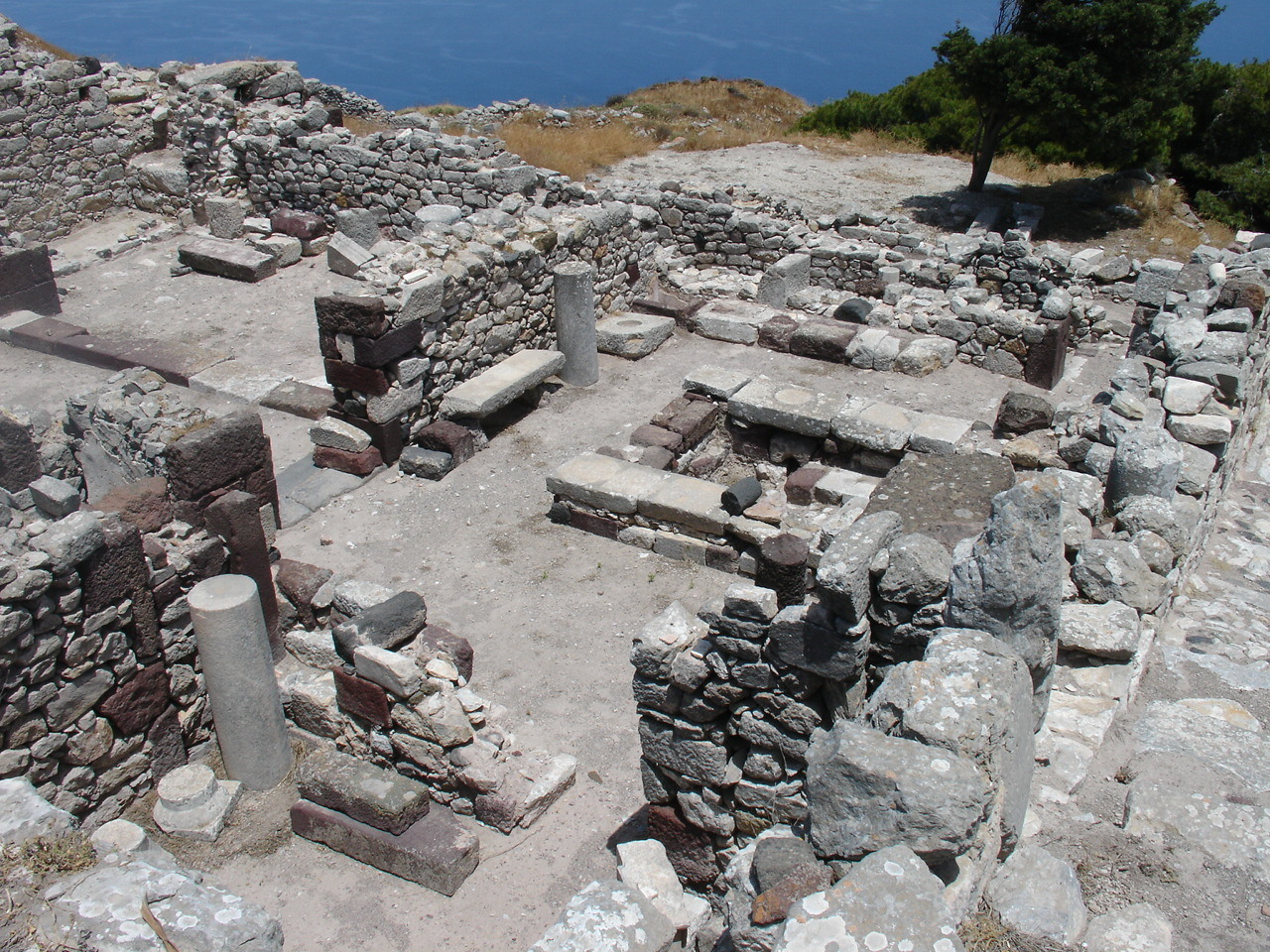
Housing ruins in Ancient Thera

The ancient city consisted of a street almost 800 m long and especially wide for its time (between two and four meters) extending in a southeastern direction and containing several imposing buildings. A small cul-de-sac branches off at right angles and at its termination, high up on the mountainside, were the headquarters of a garrison stationed in the city. After about 200 meters of street the city expands to cover an area of about 100 x 100 meters on an exposed plateau high above the rocky coast. Residential areas are grouped around an agora, which is across from a theater built into the lower slope. Separated off and facing the sea at the eastern tip of the plateau is a small sacred area with temple grounds and public facilities. All buildings are constructed of the local limestone of the mountain itself. Wood was rare on the island and seldom used for building.

At the base of the mountain at the edge of today's city (Kamari) was a necropolis which was used almost as long as the ancient city existed. The city also had a harbor, not yet precisely localized, which supposedly had shipyards and lodgings for sailors and soldiers. Ancient Thera had two seaports, namely Oia (Greek: Οία, not to be confused with modern Oia) and Elefsina (Greek: Ελευσίνα), located respectively at present-day Kamari and Perissa.

== History ==
In archaic times the city was an unimportant settlement at the southern periphery of the Cyclades. It was founded by Doric colonists from Sparta, who recognized the strategic value of its location on a rocky ridge. Herodotus and Pausanias give accounts of the mythical ruler, Theras, a descendant of the Phoenician ruler Cadmus and son of the king of Thebes, Autesion, who ruled over Sparta and Laconia on behalf of his underage nephews Eurysthenes and Procles. After they came of age he founded a new settlement on the island of Kalliste (old Greek: Καλλίστῃ), which was subsequently named Thera after him (modern Greek: Thira, Θήρα). This name was also given to the city, of which there is archaeological evidence dating from the 9th century BCE. Herodotus goes on to write of a seven-year drought around the year 630 BCE which forced the inhabitants of Thera to send colonists to Cyrenaica in today's Libya.

This settlement was so successful that Thera long enjoyed a good reputation as the mother city of Cyrene despite its own relative unimportance. A collection of 760 coins were found dating from the 6th century BCE, which give evidence of a modest amount of trade links to Athens and Corinth to the west and Ionia and Rhodes to the east.

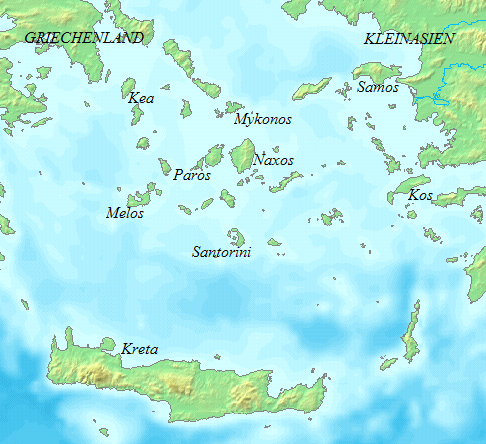
The Cyclades

The role of the city changed in the second half of the 3rd century BCE when the Ptolemaic wartime fleet for the entire Aegean Sea was stationed in the city's harbor in Hellenistic times. The city was completely rebuilt for the officers; the former layout was replaced by a regular street grid, and imposing buildings in the form of peristyle houses were erected. The fleet was withdrawn around 145 BCE, and historic records from the city are completely lacking until about the year 1.

In Roman times starting in the middle of the 1st century BCE the island and city were part of the Roman province of Asia, and although no high officials resided on the island Thera was relatively prosperous and significant, thanks to elaborate construction projects and the fact that Therans managed to attain high positions, including twice the office of provincial high priest.

In the first third of the 3rd century the dissolution of the Roman Empire was also reflected by the absence of reports about the island. During Byzantine times, Thera as a diocesan town was again more frequently mentioned; up into the 5th century it was the only urban settlement on the island of Santorini. As was the case with the entire region, it subsequently lost importance. In the year 726 it was covered by a layer of pumice after a relatively small eruption of the volcano of Santorini and shortly thereafter the city was given up. Information about the destruction comes from the reports of Theophanes, a Byzantine chronicler.

As there are only slight traces of the earlier settlement, descriptions of the city primarily relate to its Hellenistic golden age and later developments.

== Ptolemaic garrison ==
Some information about the role of the Ptolemaic soldiers in the city is known from inscriptions. There were originally only three officers and about 300 soldiers stationed in Thera, but later further office holders and pensioned officers settled there and changed the character of the city. It is not known whether the entire population was placed under military administration or whether it could retain its political independence. On the one hand the soldiers were Greeks from the mainland, but on the other hand the proportion of Egyptian mercenaries rapidly increased, who with their gods strongly influenced the city's religious cults.

== Buildings ==
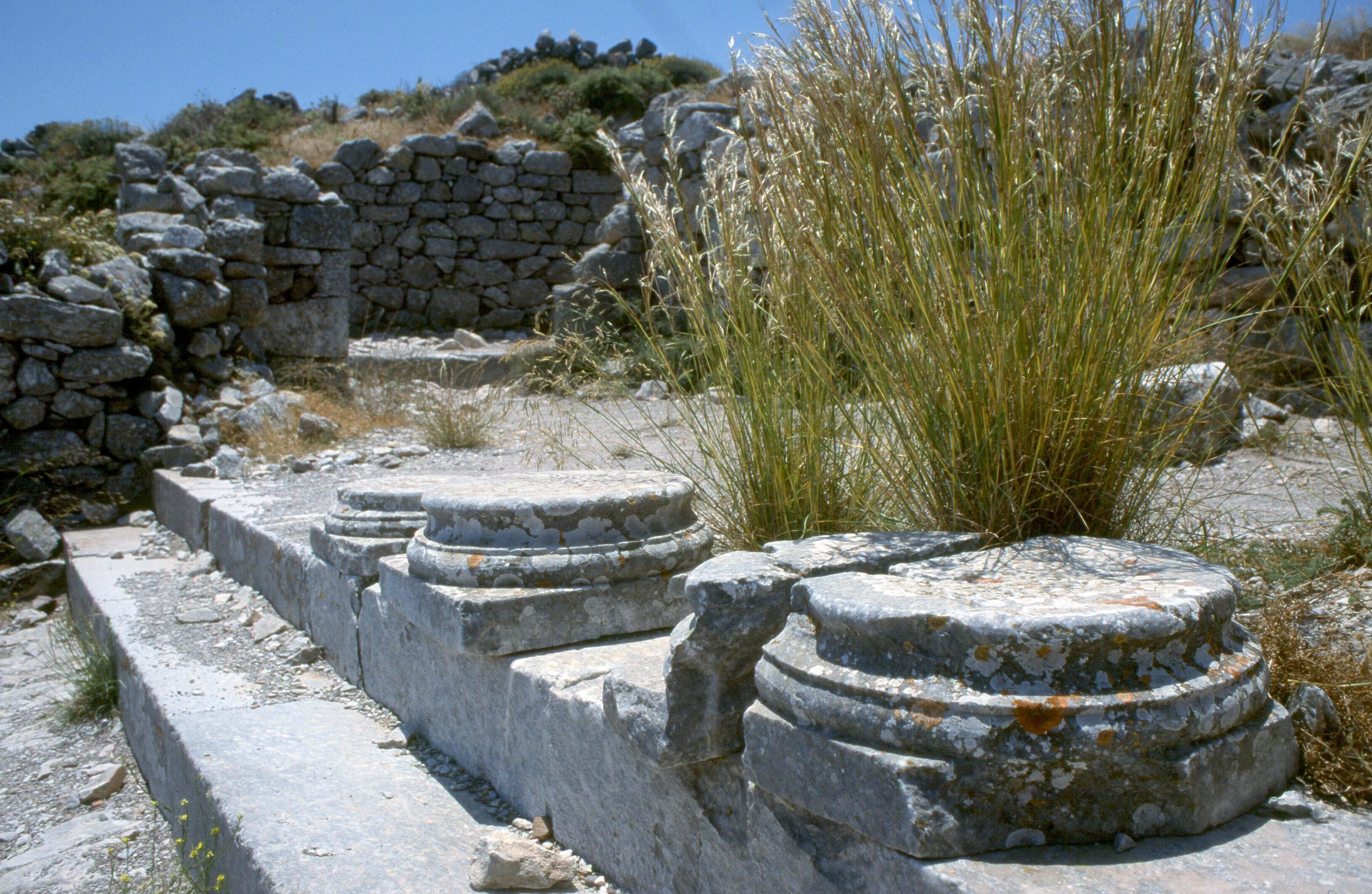
Ruins of a peristyle in Ancient Thera

Particularly noteworthy are:

- The Agora: The main square of the city follows the contours of the mountain ridge and is about 110 m long and between 17 and 30 m wide. On the western side toward the slope are the public buildings; the view eastwards toward the ocean is completely free since the private dwellings on this side were built below the level of the agora.
- The Basilike Stoa marked the center of public life; it is a huge portico 46 x 10 m in area which extends along the agora. The roof is supported by a row of ten Doric pillars along the middle axis. It was completely rebuilt in the 1st century and on the north end statues of the imperial family were positioned in a separate room
- The theater was constructed in the 2nd century in the slope below the main street, and with seating for about 1,500 exceeded the city's own requirements. Performances were held there which attracted people from all the island's settlements and perhaps from neighboring islands as well.
- The sacred area on the spur of the mountain ridge enclosed a grotto dedicated to Hermes and Heracles. In addition to the most important temple of Apollo Pythios, a joint rock sanctuary erected for the ancient Egyptian gods was added in the 3rd century BC, and from the 2nd century BC also a gymnasium of the epheboi, to which baths were added during Roman times in the 1st century AD.
- At the highest point of the city at the end of a cul-de-sac there was an impressive building which was presumably the headquarters of the fleet commander. The next-door courtyard, which was built up on two sides, is thought to have been the gymnasium of the garrison.

There is evidence of two types of private dwellings. The officers of the fleet resided in peristyle houses with colonnades, most of which were built on terraces on the eastern slope below the main street. From there the inhabitants enjoyed a spectacular view of the sea more than 300 m below. Most of the city's inhabitants lived up on the mountain plateau. They built their houses around a small central courtyard under which a cistern was located to provide an essential source of water. Some of the houses had two levels, and in a few cases the terrain permitted small basements as well.

== Art and culture ==
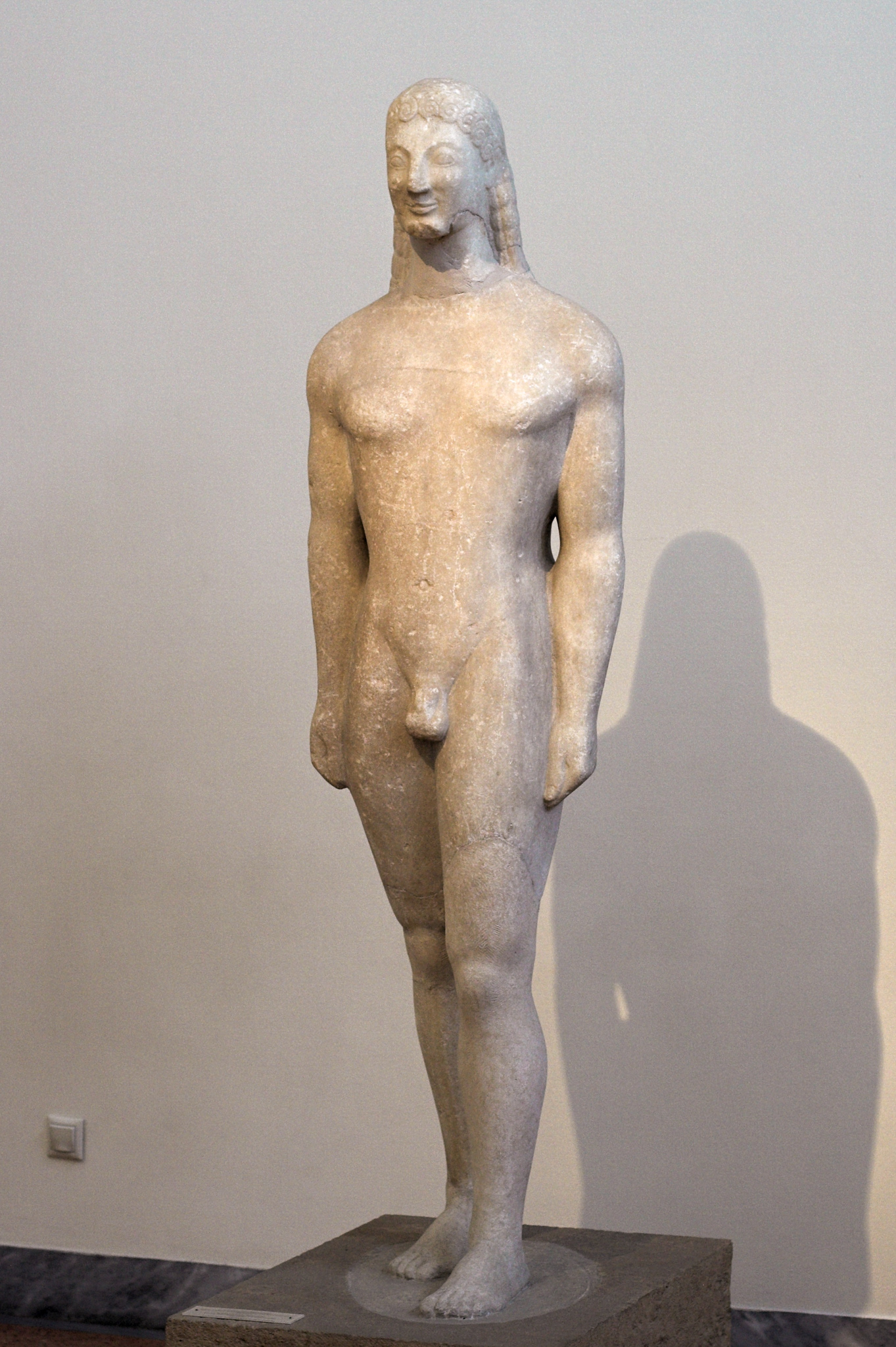
Kouros from Ancient Thera, now in the National Archaeological Museum, Athens

Archaeological remains are sparse; before the city was abandoned it had lost importance and only a few relics of its golden age survived. Inscriptions from the city's beginnings found at the sanctuary on the spur of the mountain ridge are noteworthy. They date from the transition from the 9th to the 8th century BC and are thus among the oldest known examples of the use of the Greek alphabet, which evolved from the Phoenician alphabet. In some cases a precursor form of Greek letters was still in use. The inscriptions include dedications of altar stones to a wide variety of gods from Hellenic polytheism. These include Zeus in four cases, Koures in two cases (which may be another kind of invocation for Zeus), and one each for Apollo, Lochaia, Damia, Castor and Pollux, Chiron, Deuteros, and the North wind (Boreas). Then, at a slight distance, there are inscriptions relating to the Erinyes, Athanaia, Biris, the Charites, Hermes, and Persephone (Core). Both the wide variety as well as the references to many gods who are not otherwise prominent are conspicuous features. Also noteworthy is the frequency of lesser gods connected with the family, birth, children, and the rearing of children.

The second common type of inscription was also found on the spur of the ridge, but in this case on the rock walls around the forecourt of the gymnasium, where, according to the texts, competitions and sacred acts took place already before the construction of the sports ground. These inscriptions survived thanks to the underlying limestone, which is coated with a dark, grayish blue crust which can be easily knocked off to expose the white stone underneath. Inscriptions could thus be produced by anybody, not only specialized stonemasons. Some of the texts relate directly to competitions. On one heavy stone the name of the contestant who could throw it the farthest was engraved. In other cases the inscriptions refer to sexual acts which probably describe pederastic relationships of elder erastes with young sportsmen and dancers. The texts are in a very early form of Greek and thus sometimes difficult to interpret. It is uncertain whether they are a form of boasting or whether the sexual acts had a cultic background.

Ceramic relics were found which followed both the 8th century geometric style and the 7th century orientalizing style. They resemble models from the island of Naxos, but the design was late in arriving on Santorini. Several, mostly heavily damaged figures called "Daedalic idols" date from the second half of the 7th century and were grave goods. Only one of these idols survived relatively intact. It represents a woman with raised arms, her gestures being interpreted as a lamentation for the dead.

The most famous relics from Ancient Thera are several larger-than-life statues of youths, known as kouroi, also sculpted in the second half of the 7th century BC. Since the island had no marble quarries, no unique stylistic tradition emerged; both the marble and the artistic style came from the island of Naxos. The finest statue of this type dates from the beginning of the 6th century BC and is known as the Apollo of Thera. All statues were found in the burial grounds below the city.

There are two caves in the vicinity of Ancient Thera, one of which appears to be an additional antique sanctuary and the other either a place of cult worship or simply a garbage pit, depending on how the many remains of bones and traces of food preparation are interpreted.
