= Sellada =

Mountain pass in Santorini, Greece

Coordinates: 36°22′6.24″N 25°28′26.76″E

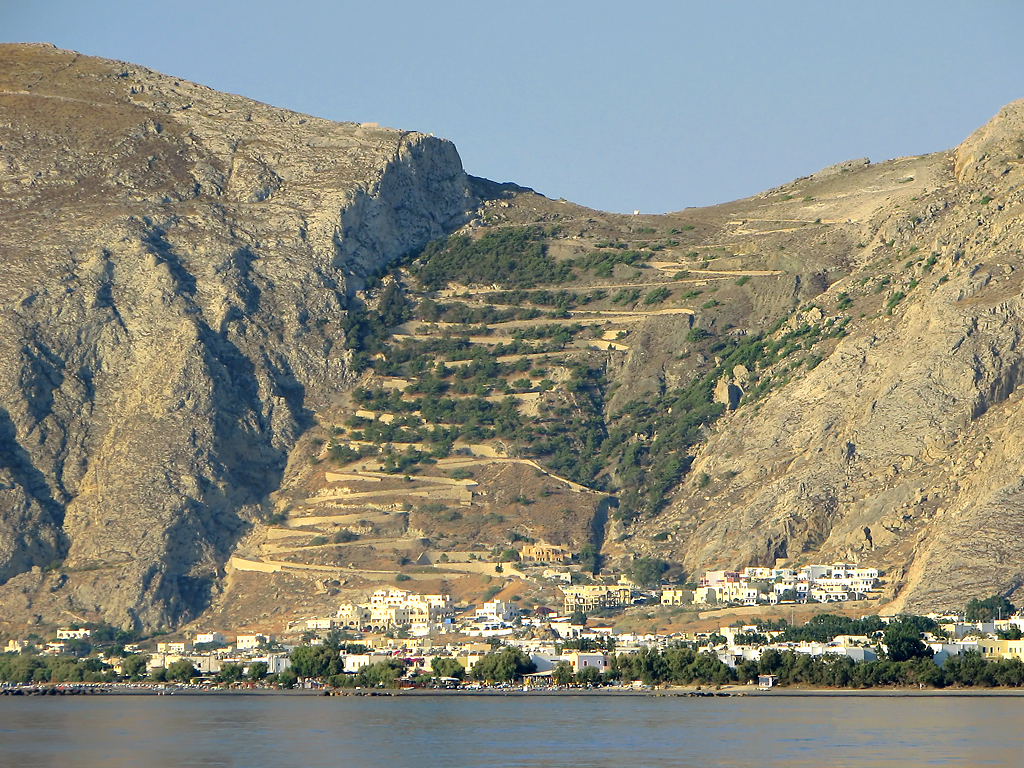
The north-eastern slope of Sellada seen from the sea with Kamari below. The meandering road leads to Ancient Thera.

Sellada (Greek: Σελλάδα) is a mountain pass between the peaks of Profitis Ilias and Mesa Vouno, near the village of Kamari in the island of Santorini, Greece. The north-eastern and north-western slopes of Sellada accommodated the necropolis (i.e., cemetery) of Ancient Thera, an ancient city of Santorini. Excavations conducted in Sellada by Nikolaos Zapheiropoulos during the years 1961 - 1982 uncovered several tombs with funeral gifts, pithoi, and funerary kouroi and korai, some of which are exhibited at Fira archaeological museum.
