= Archaeological Museum of Thera =

Museum in Fira, Santorini, Greece

Coordinates: 36.4202°N 25.4309°E

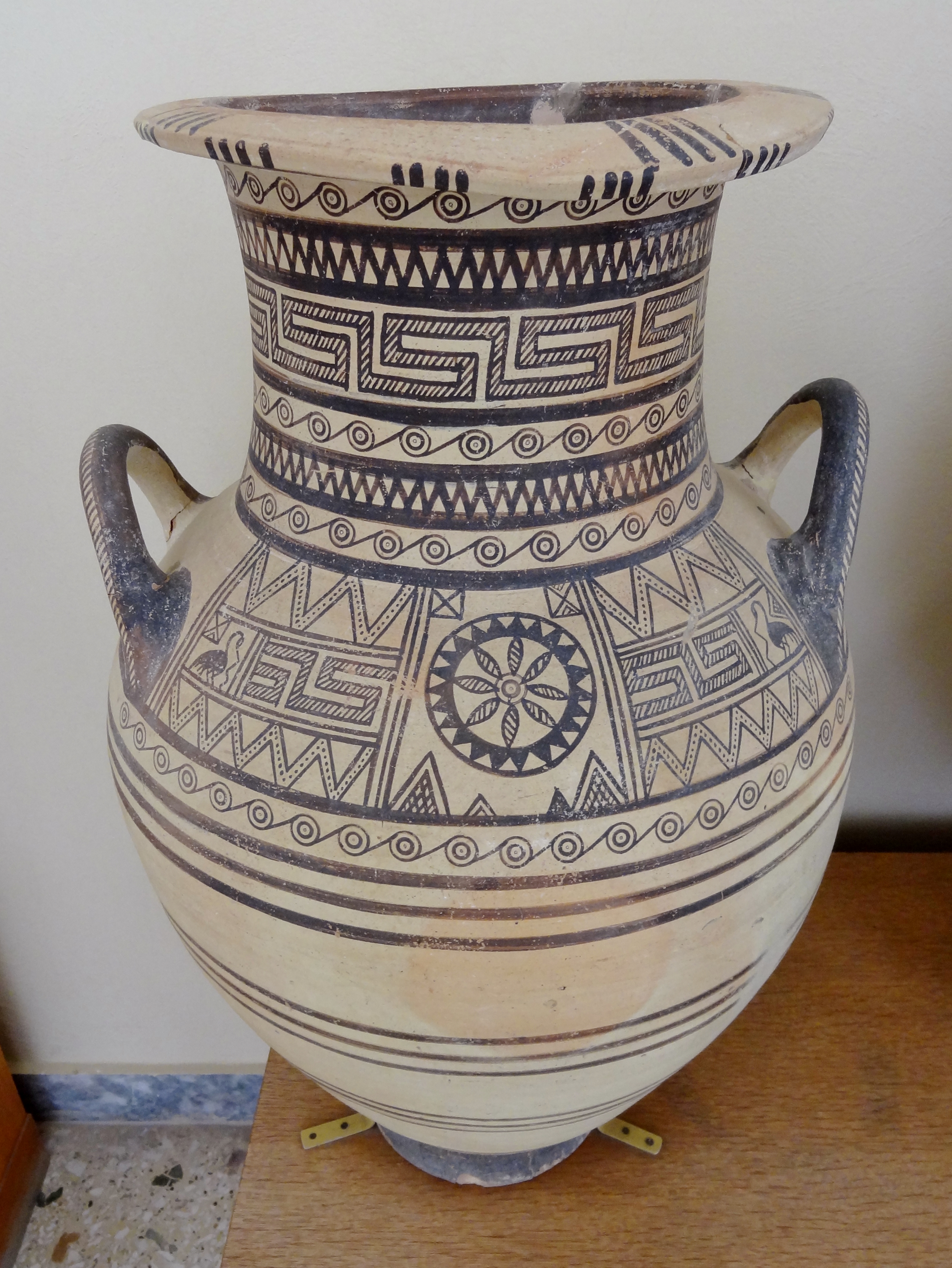
Amphora from Thera, c. 700 BC. Archaeological Museum of Thera

The Archaeological Museum of Thera is a museum in Fira, Santorini, Greece. It was built in 1960 to replace an older one which had collapsed by the 1956 Amorgos earthquake.

Its collection houses artifacts that range from the Archaic to the Roman periods.

Exposed artifacts include pottery and amphorae of Geometric and Archaic periods. Many of these objects come from the ancient cemetery of Thera. One of them is a krater with Attic black figures from grave no. 1, with four ships on the internal surface, around the rim.

Ancient ships 6th century BC

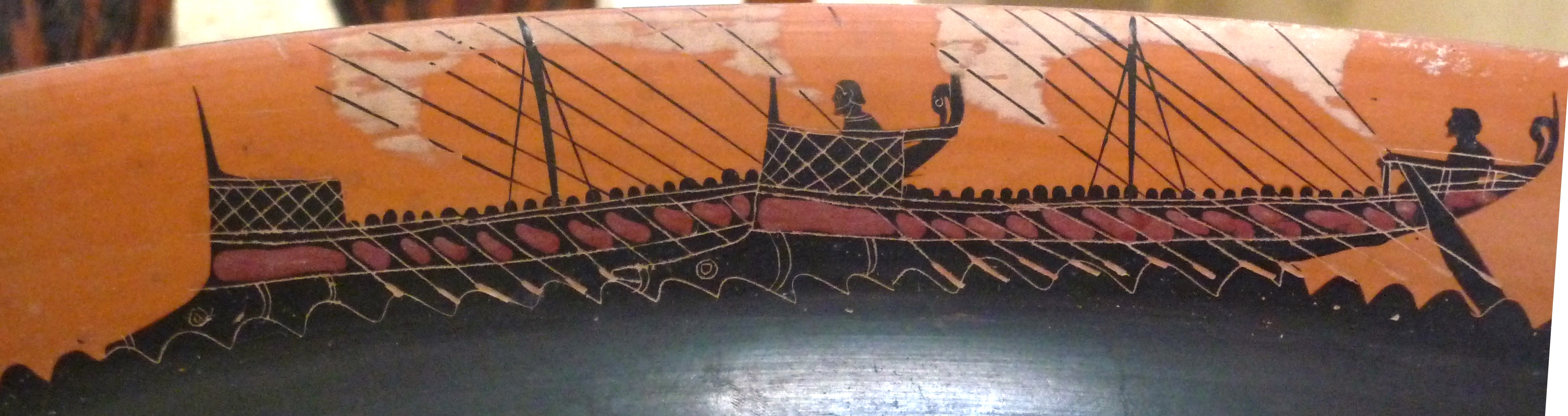

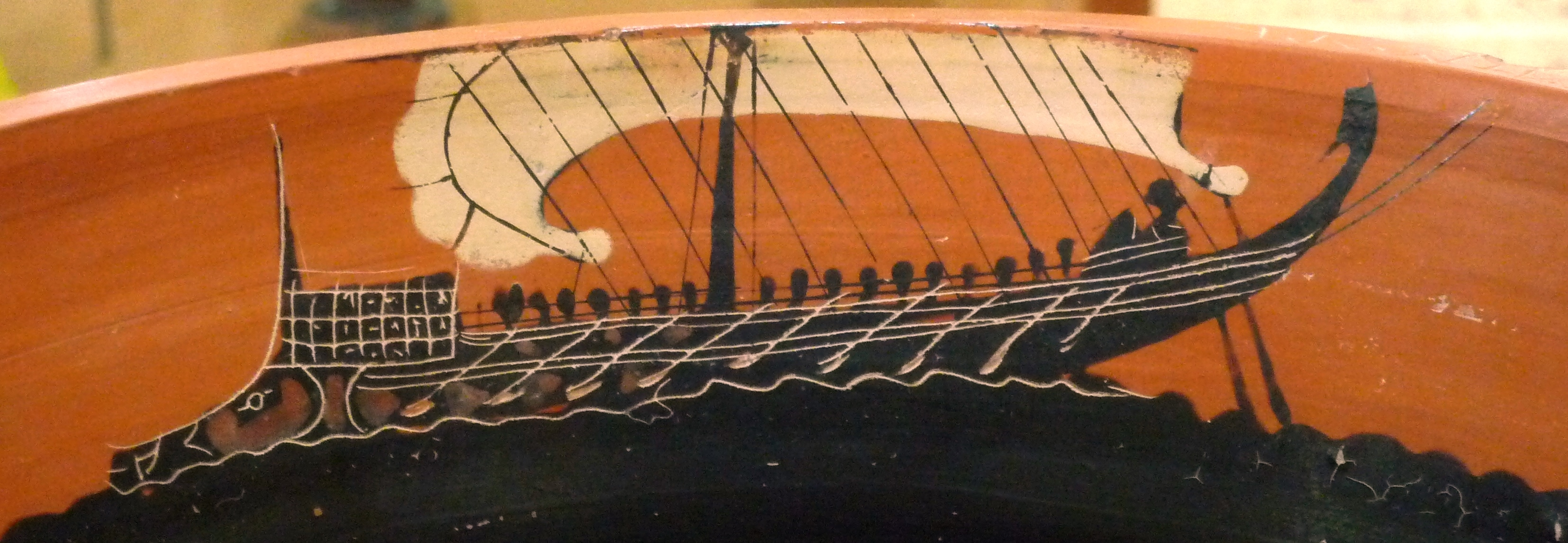

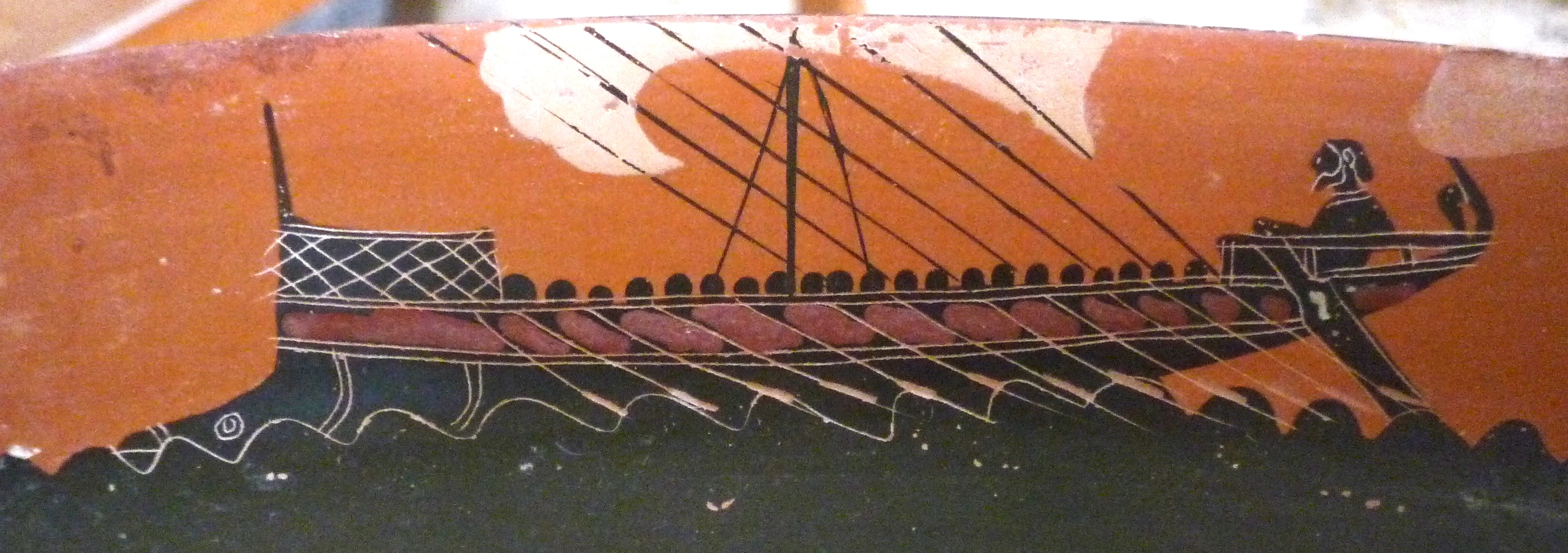

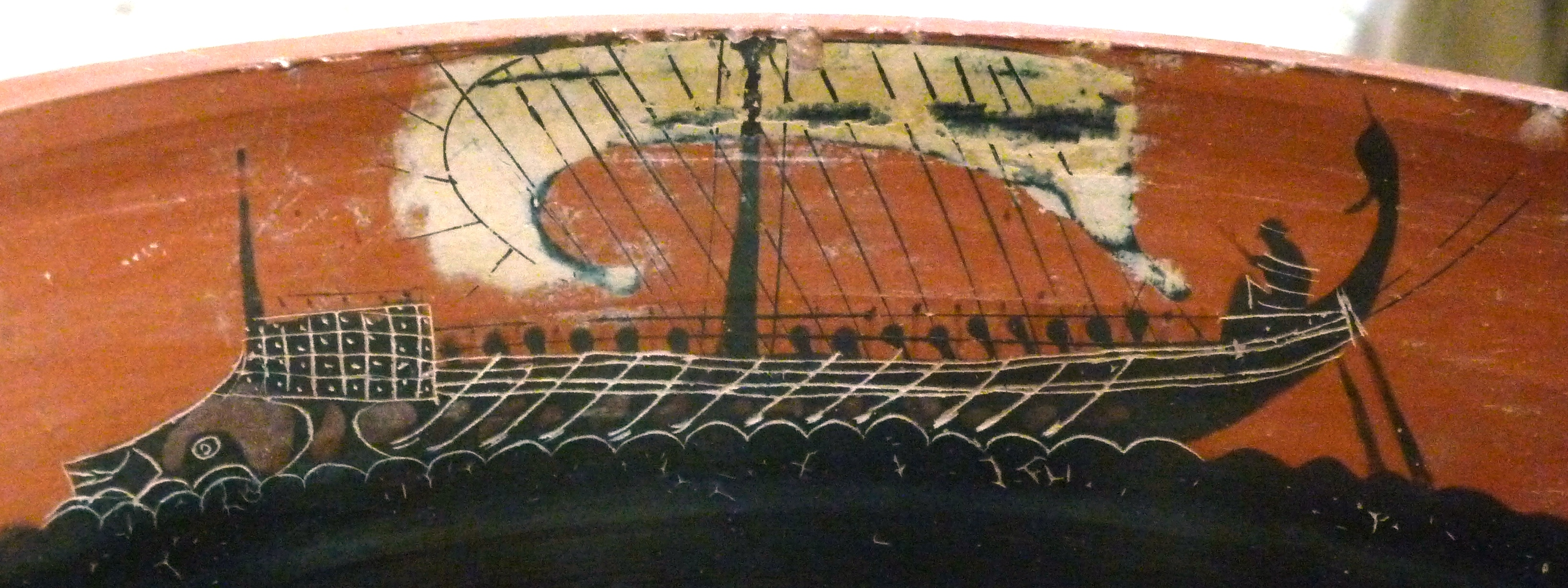
