= Three Bells of Fira =

Church in France, Greece

- Catholic Church of the Dormition
- Τρεις καμπάνες των Φηρών
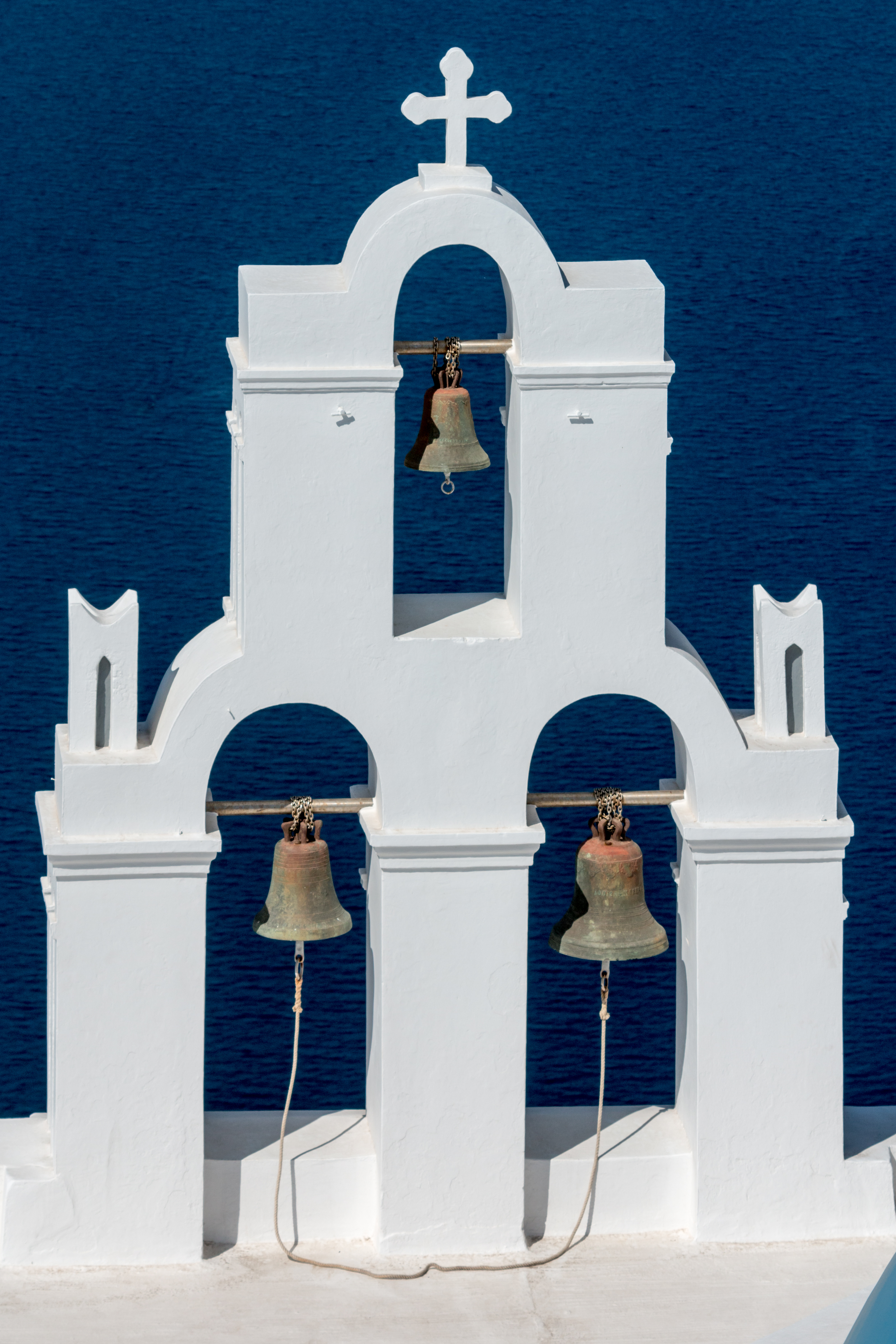
- The famous Three Bells of the church

- Location of the church in Greece
- Three Bells of Fira
- 36°25′24″N 25°25′42″E
- Location: Fira, Santorini
- Country: Greece
- Language: Greek
- Denomination: Eastern Catholic
- Sui iuris church: Latin Church
- Tradition: Greek Byzantine
- Religious institute: Jesuits (former)

History
- Status: Church

Architecture
- Functional status: Active
- Completed: 1757

Administration
- Diocese: Santorini (RC)

The Three Bells of Fira (Greek: Τρεις καμπάνες των Φηρών), officially known as the Catholic Church of the Dormition, is an Eastern Catholic Greek Byzantine church, located in the town of Fira, on the island of Santorini, in the Southern Aegean region of Greece. The church is known for its blue dome, three bells and views, located directly above the cliffs which dominate western Santorini.

== History ==
The site of the modern Three Bells of Fira has been occupied by a number of other buildings. In the mid-17th century, two modest cave churches were built into the then-solid cliff face. These churches were eventually destroyed as the cliff receded (due to the ongoing expansion of Fira) and an infirmary was built. This building was eventually occupied by Jesuits, who lived on the site until the land was given to the Diocese of Santorini. The current church was built in 1757, and then refurbished and expanded multiple times over the centuries. The structure was heavily damaged in the 1956 Amorgos earthquake, after which the building was restored. The church's feast day is 15 August.

== See also ==
- Greek Byzantine Catholic Church
- List of churches in Greece
