= Kamari =

Village in Santorini, Greece

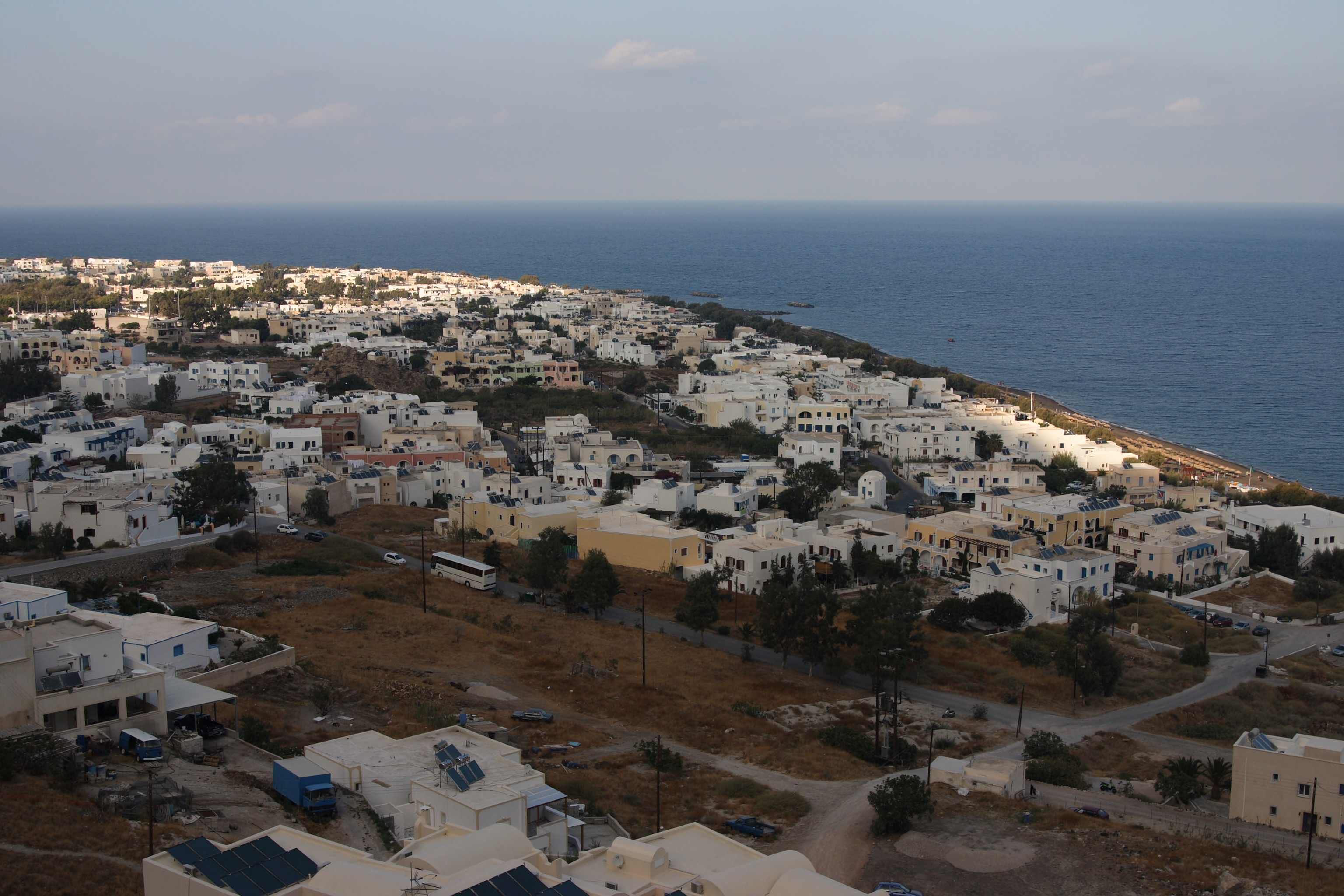
- Interactive map of Kamari
- Coordinates: 36°22′36.39″N 25°28′54.58″E
- Country: Greece
- Municipality: Thira

Population (2021)
  - Total: 1,065

Kamari (Greek: Καμάρι) is a coastal village on the southeastern part of the Aegean island of Santorini, Greece, in the Cyclades archipelago with a population of 1,065 according to the 2021 census. It is part of the Municipality of Thira and is situated approximately 8 km away from the island's capital Fira. Kamari was built by residents of the nearby village of Episkopi Gonias, which was almost flattened by a devastating earthquake that hit Santorini in July 1956.

The village got its name from a small arch (Greek: Καμάρα, Kamara) at the south end of its beach and is what remains from an old customs house (Greek: Παλιό Τελωνείο, Palió Teloneío) built between 1537 - 1650. This arch is also the site of annual Ephipany and Blessing of the Water tradition for the area.

Today, it stretches along a beach covered with black pebbles, which is the longest of the island. The beach extends in a northeast to southwest direction from Monolithos to the feet of the Mesa vouno mountain that rises up to a height of approx. 400m, being Santorini's second highest peak. Once an agricultural and fishing village, modern Kamari boasts a thriving tourist industry, offering a wide choice of accommodation, restaurants, cafes, bars and night clubs, plus several water sport activities.

In 2002, an archaic sanctuary dedicated to Achilles was discovered in Kamari.

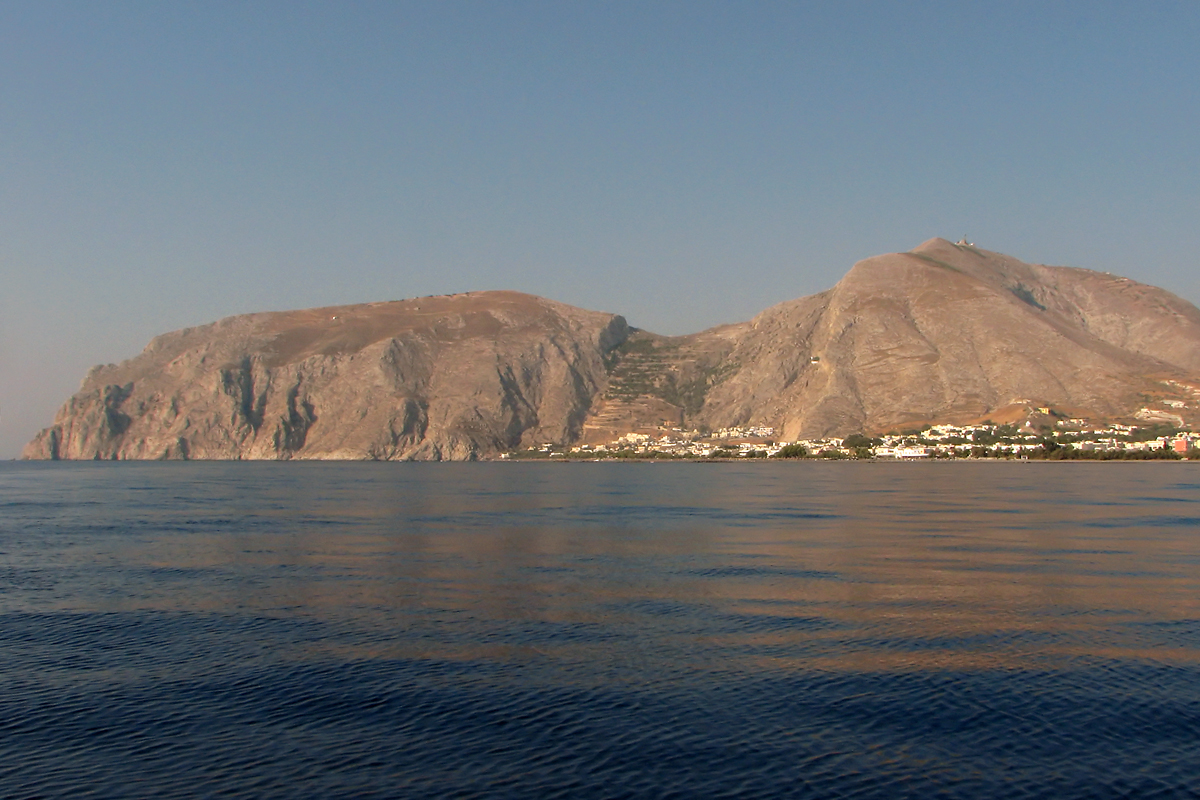
Kamari view from the sea. The peak of Mesa Vouno is on the left, that of Profitis Ilias on the right and the meandering road to Ancient Thera in between.

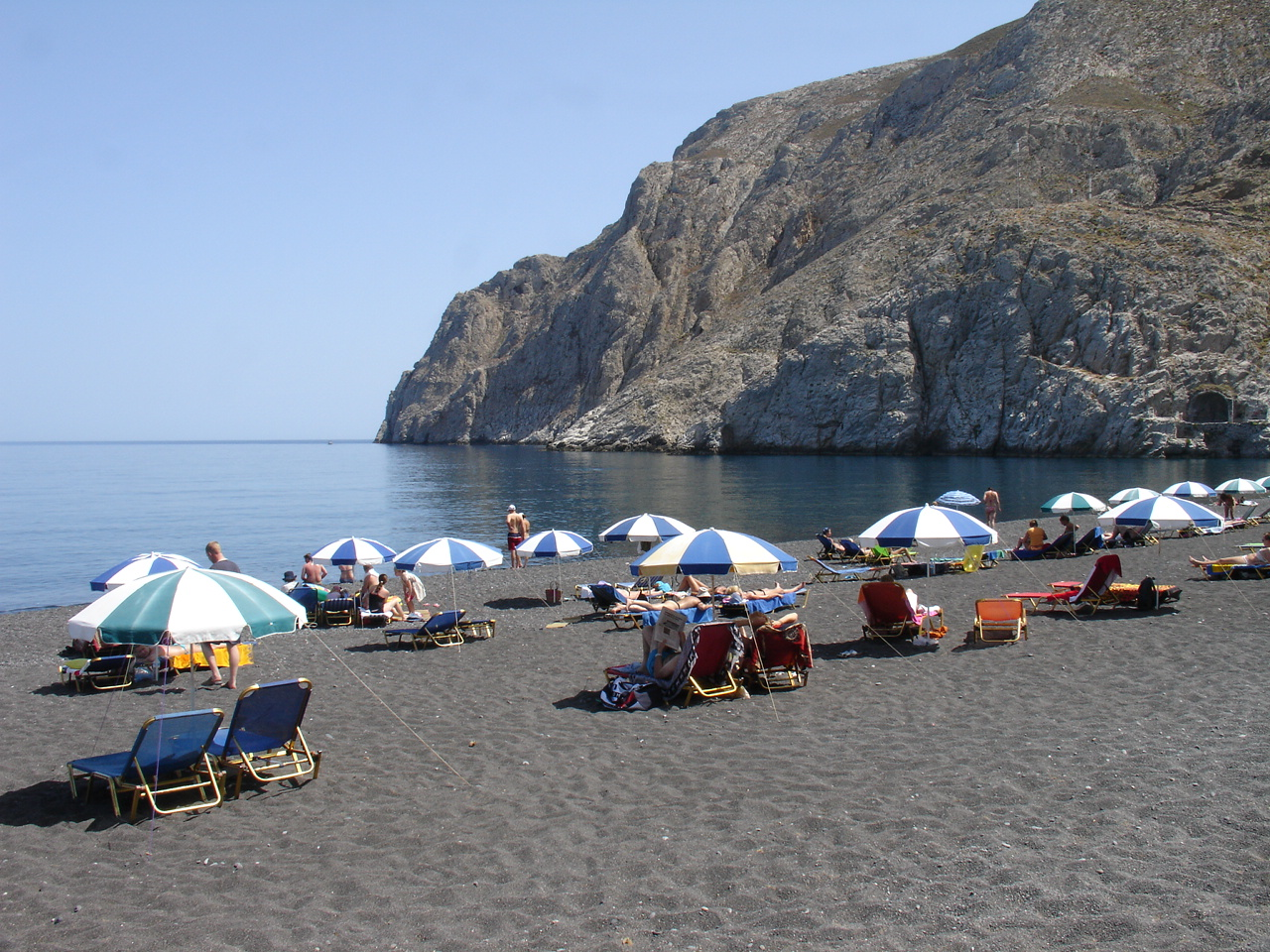
Kamari beach. The old customs house arch can be seen near the right edge of the image, right above the sea-level.

== See also ==
- Ancient Thera
- Episkopi Gonias
- Sellada
