= Wolfram Hoepfner =

German classicist, archaeologist, architectural historian and professor

Wolfram Hoepfner (born 16 March 1937, in Breslau) is a German classicist, archaeologist, architectural historian, and Professor of Ancient Architectural History, at the Free University of Berlin.

== Life ==
He studied at the Free University of Berlin, and at Technische Universität Berlin, in Classical Archaeology and architecture. In 1965, he received his doctorate on the subject of Heraclea Pontica. He received his Dr.-Ing. 's degree, with the thesis, Eine baugeschichtliche Untersuchung. He then became assistant to Heinrich Ernst. He participated in excavations in Alzey, under the direction of Wilhelm Unverzagt, in the Kerameikos in Athens (Dieter Oly and Gottfried Gruben), in Persia (Heinz Luschey), Bithynia and in Commagene (Friedrich Karl Dörner). In 1965 to 1966, he was a year travel scholarship of the German Archaeological Institute (DAI). For the DAI in 1966, he was also active in the department in Athens. From 1973, he was head of the newly established Office of Architecture at the headquarters of the German Archaeological Institute in Berlin and the second director of the DAI office. In 1975, he earned habilitation at the TU Berlin, and was appointed a professor there in 1980. In 1988, he was appointed Professor of Ancient Architectural History, at the Free University Berlin. He retired in the winter semester of 2001 to 2002.

He led excavations for ordinary members of the DAI to Greece and Asia Minor. He headed the excavations in Kassope, with Ernst-Ludwig Schwandner, Sotiris Dakaris and K. Gravani. With Schwandner, he also heads the research project "Living in the classical polis." Hoepfner is considered an expert on the architecture of the Late Classic, particularly academic buildings, for the late Hellenistic architecture and the topography of ancient Rhodes.

== Works ==
- Das Pompeion und seine Nachfolgerbauten, de Gruyter, Berlin 1976 (Kerameikos, Bd. 10). ISBN 3-11-005906-1
- Friedrich Karl Dörner (ed) Arsameia am Nymphaios, E. Wasmuth, 1983, ISBN 978-3-8030-1754-3
- Haus und Stadt im klassischen Griechenland (with Ernst-Ludwig Schwandner), Deutscher Kunstverlag, München 1986 (Wohnen in der klassischen Polis, Bd. 1) ISBN 3-422-00788-1
- Die griechische Polis. Architektur und Politik (ed. with Gerhard Zimmer), Wasmuth, Tübingen 1993 (Schriften des Seminars für Klassische Archäologie der Freien Universität Berlin) ISBN 3-8030-1041-1
- Das dorische Thera, Gebrüder Mann, Berlin ab 1997 (Schriften des Seminars für Klassische Archäologie der Freien Universität Berlin)
- Antike Bibliotheken (ed.), von Zabern, Mainz 2002 (Antike Welt Sonderband; Zaberns Bildbände zur Archäologie) ISBN 3-8053-2846-X
- Der Koloß von Rhodos und die Bauten des Helios. Neue Forschungen zu einem der Sieben Weltwunder, voan Zabern, Mainz 2003 (Antike Welt Sonderband; Zaberns Bildbände zur Archäologie) ISBN 3-8053-3253-X
- Halikarnassos und das Maussolleion: die modernste Stadtanlage der späten Klassik und der als Weltwunder gefeierte Grabtempel des karischen Königs Maussollos. Darmstadt: Verlag Philipp von Zabern, 2013.
- Die Sakralarchitektur der kommagenischen Hierothesia und Temene. Asia Minor Studien, 83. Bonn: Rudolf Habelt Verlag, 2017.
