= Fira =

Capital and largest town on Santorini Island

Firá Φηρά
- Community
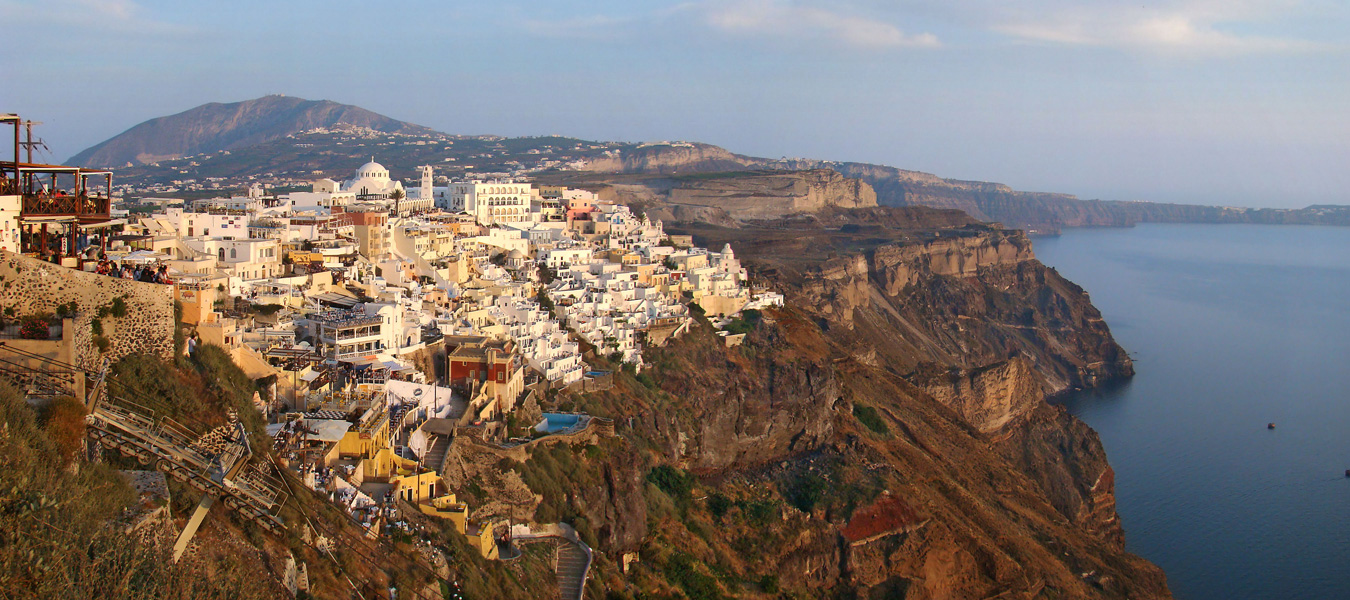

- Location within Greece
- Coordinates: 36°25.2′N 25°25.9′E
- Country: Greece
- Administrative region: South Aegean
- Regional unit: Thira
- Municipality: Thira
- Municipal unit: Thira

Population (2021)
  - Community: 1,516
- Time zone: UTC+2 (EET)
  - Summer (DST): UTC+3 (EEST)

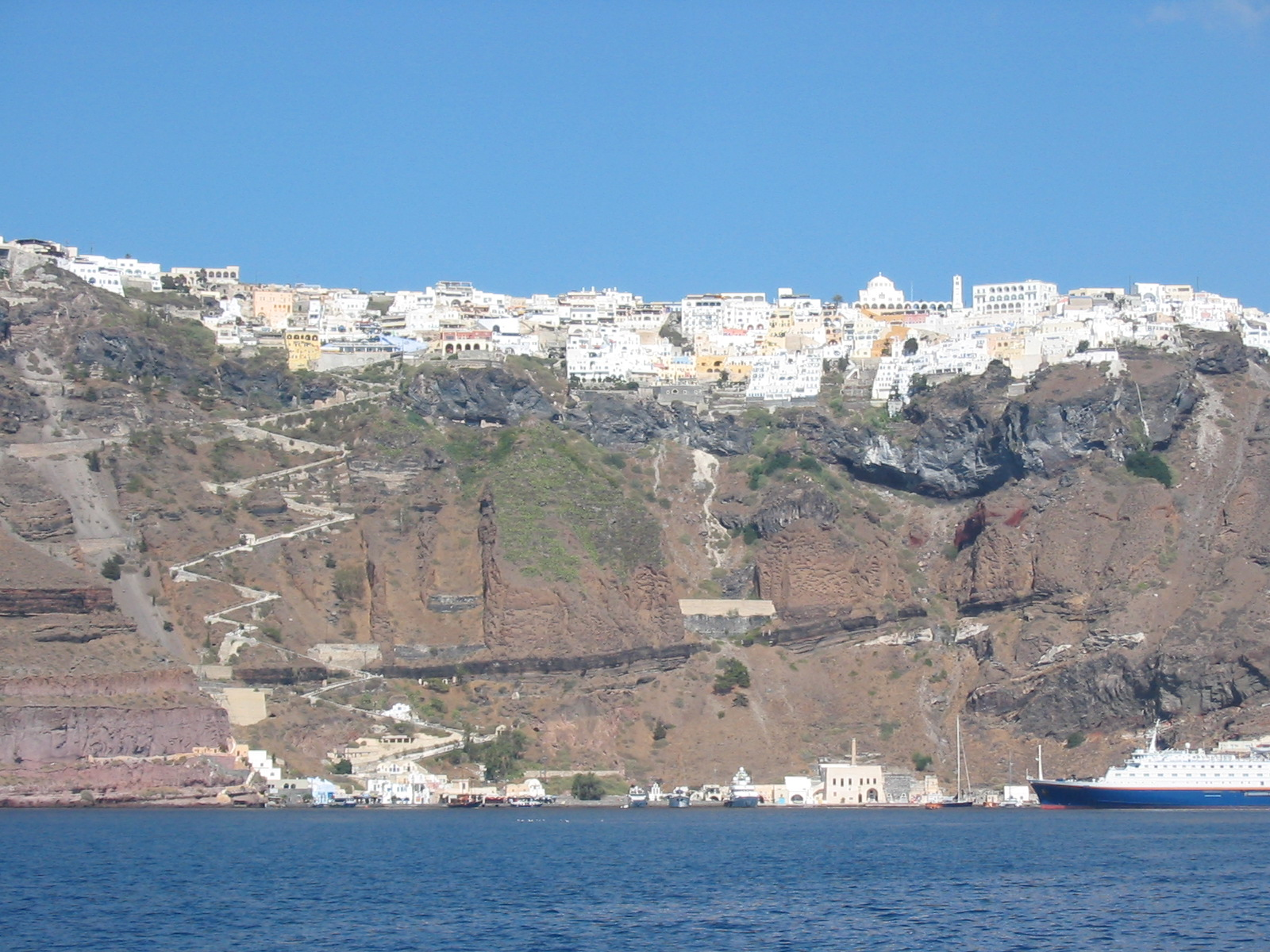
View of Fira from the sea

Firá (Greek: Φηρά, pronounced [fiˈra], official name Φηρά Θήρας - Firá Thíras) is the modern capital of the Greek Aegean island of Santorini (Thera). A traditional settlement, "Firá" derives its name from an alternative pronunciation of "Thíra", the ancient name of the island itself.

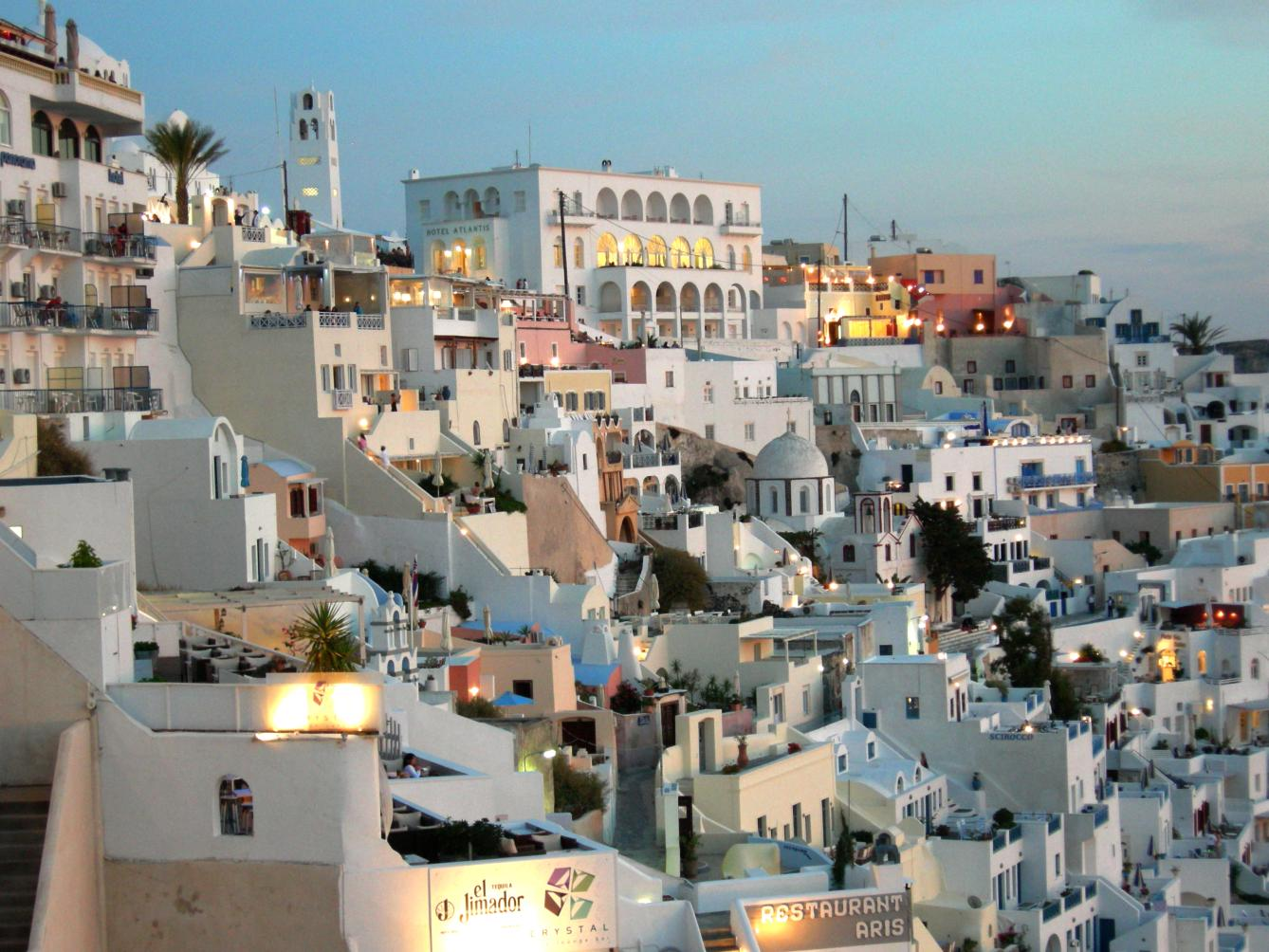
View of Fira

Fira is a city of whitewashed houses built on the edge of the 400 metres (1,312 feet) high caldera on the western edge of the semi-circular island of Thera. The two main museums of interest are the Archaeological Museum of Thera, 30 metres (98 feet) east of the cable car entrance, and the Museum of Prehistoric Thera at the southeast corner of the White Orthodox Cathedral of Ypapanti ([it]), built on the site of an earlier church destroyed in the 1956 Amorgos earthquake. The town also hosts a number of churches, including the Cathedral of Ypapanti and the Three Bells of Fira.

Access to Fira is mainly by roads on its eastern side, climbing from its port via the zigzag footpath on foot or on donkeys, or by riding the steep cable car from its lower terminal by the port. The central square of Fira is called Plateia Theotokopoulou, with a bus and taxi station, banks, and pharmacies.

From Fira there is a panoramic view of the 18 kilometres (11 miles) long caldera from southern Cape Akrotiri to northern Cape Ag. Nikolaos, plus the volcanic island Nea Kameni at the center with Thirassia Island. Large cruise ships anchor in the small harbor between Nea Kameni and Fira.
