= Floss Casasola =

British Honduran teacher and music instructor

- Born: Floss Effie Kemp; August 9, 1903; Belize City, British Honduras
- Died: February 9, 1991 (aged 87); Belize City, Belize
- Other names: Floss Effie Casasola
- Occupations: teacher, politician
- Years active: 1920–1973

Floss Casasola MBE OD (9 August 1903 – 9 February 1991) was a British Honduran teacher and music instructor who became involved in the Belizean Independence Movement. She was one of the first women to vie for public office, serving on the Belize City Council from 1952 to 1956. Recognized numerous times for her contributions to increasing literacy and music development in the country, she was honored as a Member of the Order of the British Empire, with the Outstanding Artist Award in 1997 and in 2010 was posthumously awarded the Order of Distinction from the government of Belize.

== Early life ==
Floss Effie Kemp was born in 1903 in Belize City, British Honduras to Diana and Joseph Kemp. The youngest of seven siblings, her father died when she was one year old and the children were raised by their mother. Completing her elementary education at Wesley School, she went on to further her education as a pupil-teacher, earning her certification to teach while a teenager.

== Career ==
Kemp began teaching at Wesley School and later moved to Ebenezer School, where she remained until Belize City was devastated by the 1931 hurricane and she was forced to move to another part of the city. While the damage was extensive and took considerable time to clean up, Kemp used her time to study music and began playing the organ at the Wesley Church. She soon became the choirmaster and began taking in students for piano lessons. She was classically trained and insisted that her students study theory. She returned to Wesley Primary School when it reopened and designed the uniform of the school, extending her teaching to adults, whom she taught at the Belize City prison on Sundays. During one of those visits to the prisons in the early 1950s, she met Philip Goldson, who was serving time for sedition.

In 1933, Kemp married Edward Frederick Casasola. Though they had no children of their own, she raised his children from a prior relationship and two girls, Greta Palma and Janice Robateau, whom she adopted. Casasola was active in the Wesley Women's League and composed traditional folk songs for the group in Belizean Creole. She also founded several youth groups, including the B-Sharp Music Club, the Excelsior Choir and Drama Group, and the Wesley Primary School Choir. Each of these groups were active in the 1950s in competitions for drama, elocution and music, participating annually in the Festival of Arts.

Casasola was elected as the president of the British Honduras Federation of Teachers in 1949 and began participating in regional conferences in such places as Barbados, Jamaica, Mexico and Puerto Rico. She was instrumental in the creation of a teacher's pension plan. Having become an active member in the Belizean Independence Movement, she ran for a seat on the Belize City Council in 1952. Her successful bid, as a candidate of the National Party, earned her a stipend of $50 per month. In 1954 the year that universal suffrage was granted in British Honduras, Casasola was made principal of Wesley Primary School. In addition to acting head of the school, she tutored students free-of-charge to prepare for the Pupil Teachers' Examination in the evenings.

Casasola was reelected in 1956, becoming the first woman to run for a political office after full suffrage was granted in the country. No candidates for the National Party were elected in 1957 and as a result, the National Party and the Honduran Independence Party merged to form the National Independence Party (NIP). As elections approached in 1958, the NIP did not select her to run for re-election. Instead, she vied as an independent candidate and was expelled from the party for her disloyalty. Casasola was later reinstated to the party and was honored as a Member of the Order of the British Empire on 31 December 1960. She ran as a representative of the Albert Division in 1961, but lost her bid. That election was her last attempt to hold an elected office, though she did become a Justice of the Peace. Casasola continued to be politically active through the transformation of the NIP to the United Democratic Party in 1973.

After she withdrew from political life, Casasola continued teaching music lessons in her home. Some of her noted students include Yvonne Pilgrim Suite, Francis Reneau and Colville Young.

== Death and legacy ==
Casasola died in Belize City in 1991. Posthumously, she was honored at the Outstanding Artists' Awards ceremony in 1997 for her contributions to music. In 2010, she was posthumously awarded the Order of Distinction from Prime Minister Dean Barrow.
