= Leigh Richardson =

Belizean politician (1924–2008)

Member of the British Honduras Legislative Assembly for Belize West
- In office 28 April 1954 – 20 March 1957
- Preceded by: (constituency created)
- Succeeded by: Albert Cattouse

Personal details
- Born: 26 April 1924 Puerto Castilla, Honduras
- Died: 27 October 2008 (aged 84) New York City, New York, United States
- Party: Honduran Independence Party (1956–1958); People's United Party (1950–1956)

Leigh Richardson (26 April 1924 – 27 October 2008) was a Honduran-born Belizean politician. Richardson served as the leader of the People's United Party in the 1950s, and also as mayor of Belize City.

== Early life ==
Richardson was born to Belizean parents in Puerto Castilla, Honduras. He moved with his parents to Belize, then known as British Honduras, at the age of five. A leader in Belize's independence movement, he was imprisoned in 1951 along with Philip Goldson for charges of sedition brought against them by the British colonial authorities. He was co-founder of the Belize Billboard and held leadership positions in the People's Committee.

== Formation of the PUP and aftermath ==
Richardson was a founding member of the People's United Party and was elected as its second leader. He led the PUP to its first major political victory in 1954. After George Cadle Price's successful takeover of the PUP in 1956, along with Goldson and others Richardson broke with the party and formed the Honduran Independence Party, which later merged with the National Party to create the National Independence Party (NIP). Under Richardson's leadership the HIP finished a distant second in the 1957 elections and was completely shut out of the British Honduras Legislative Assembly. Richardson moved to Trinidad in early 1958, effectively leaving party leadership to Goldson. He later moved to New York City. After Richardson's death his family claimed he was exiled from Belize.

Later the NIP along with the Liberal Party and the People's Development Movement joined forces in 1973 for opposition politics in Belize (then called British Honduras) and became the United Democratic Party (UDP).

== Honors ==
On 18 September 2008, shortly before his death and despite living abroad for decades, Richardson was formally recognized as a Belizean patriot. He was conferred with the Order of Distinction, the nation's third-highest honor, during that year's independence celebrations. Richardson's sister accepted the honour on his behalf, as he was too ill to attend.

Richardson died in October 2008 due to complications from Parkinson's disease.
