= Benque House of Culture =

Cultural organization in Belize

- Location: Benque Viejo del Carmen, Belize
- Owner: NICH Belize

The Benque Viejo House of Culture is an art gallery established on 6 September 2001, as a non-governmental organization used to teach individuals about the various cultures in Benque Viejo del Carmen, Belize. The organization was founded by different individuals with proactive visions to change the environment around its communities through various projects such as the reconstruction of the centennial park. Through the various projects this organization has established under the leadership of culture ambassador David Ruiz. It is well incorporated with the Community of Artists for Cultural and Historical Endeavors and National Institute of Culture and History

== History ==
The Government of Belize had been in association with the Cultural and Historical Association of Benque Viejo in the 1980s with the National Arts Council (Bliss Institute) and the Department of Museums. Through this process the organization was able to attain membership with the Commonwealth Associations of Museums and the Museum of Association of the Caribbean. The Benque House of Culture is supported by the Cultural and Historical Association of Benque Viejo an organization incorporated to help promote Belizean culture and history. During the 1990s Cultural and Historical Association of Benque Viejo had been under leadership at the Benque House of Culture previously known as the old police station supervised by project coordinator Mr. David Ruiz. The Cultural and Historical Association of Benque Viejo had a period of changeover in January 1999. This change organized artists to form a body known as the Community of Artists in Benque Viejo.

In due time a decision came to pass with the collaboration of the Government of Belize to establish House of Cultures all through the country. Through the Cultural and Historical of Benque Viejo and the Community of Artists combined to establish the Community of Artists for Cultural and Historical Endeavors. The first order of decision of the Cultural of Artists for Cultural History and Endeavors was to open a House of Culture for Benque Viejo. The Community of Artists for the Community of Artists for Cultural and Historical Endeavors a Non-Governmental Organization is the main organization to support the House of Culture in Benque Viejo, which was officially inaugurated by the former Prime Minister of Belize Honorable Said Musa on 6 September 2001. The facility is now run by a full-time administrator and activities coordinator that includes their own offices. It also includes a lobby, small gallery and an outdoor gazebo. The town's former police station cells have been refurbished to display the historical exhibitions.

== Exhibitions ==
The House of Culture opened a new exhibit opened on 11 September 2004, named, “Pictorial History of Benque Viejo”. Images added to this section of the exhibit were contributed by the National Archives and the Community of Artists for Cultural and Historical Endeavors. Another exhibit was opened as well called, "Bob Marley Exhibit", in honor of Bob Marley which outlines the impact of cultural music on the world.
