= Baron Bliss =

British philanthropist in Belize (1869–1926)

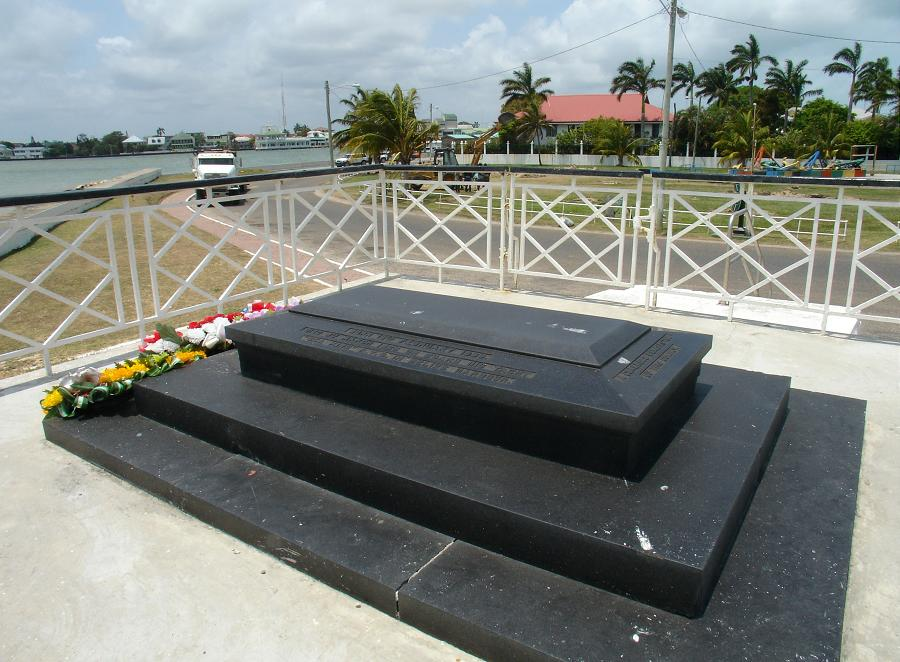
- The tomb of Baron Bliss in Belize City
- Born: 16 February 1869; Great Marlow, Buckinghamshire, England
- Died: 9 March 1926 (aged 57) near Belize City, British Honduras
- Occupation: Philanthropist

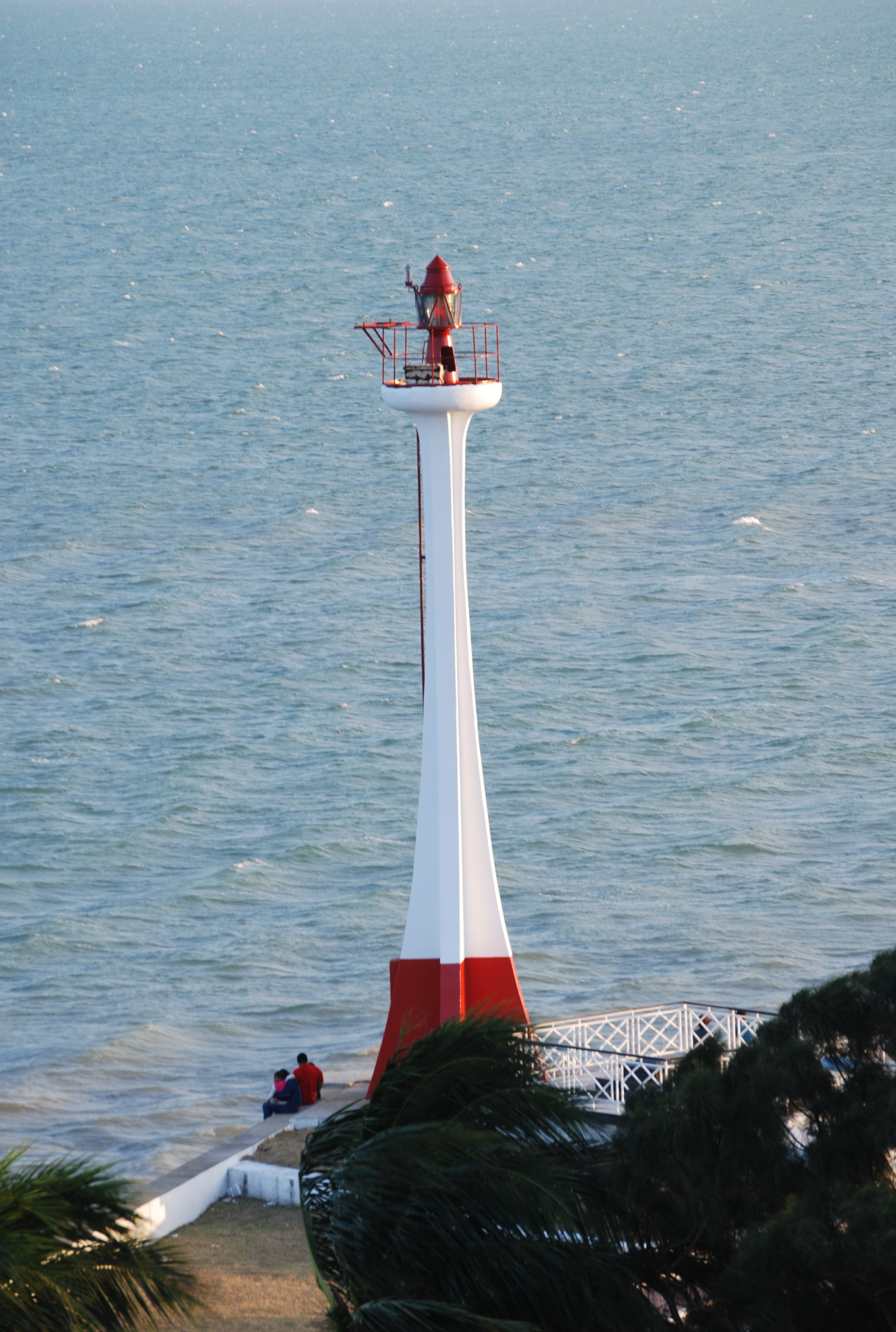
Baron Bliss Light in Belize City

Edward Ernest Victor Bliss, 4th Baron Bliss, commonly known as Baron Bliss (16 February 1869 – 9 March 1926), was a British-born traveller who willed nearly two million British Honduras dollars to a trust fund for the benefit of the citizens of what was then the colony of British Honduras, now Belize.

== Biography ==
Baron Bliss was born in 1869 and lived in Marlow, Buckinghamshire, England as a youth. His father was Henry Aldridge, who inherited the estate of his uncle Edward Bliss of Brandon, Suffolk, a manufacturer of flintlock mechanisms for guns and changed his surname to Bliss under the terms of his uncle's will.

In 1855, Henry Bliss inherited the estate and title of his cousin the Baron de Alreyo of the Kingdom of Portugal, although he was styled the Baron de Bliss due to the conditions stated in his uncle's will.

In June 1869, he was granted another bequest from Colonel Carlo Antonio Barreto of the Kingdom of Spain, with the stipulation that he change his name to Barreto, and he did so in spite of the earlier limitation from his uncle.

Henry Edward Ernest Victor de Barreto was an engineer by trade and on the death of his father in 1890, became the 4th Baron de Barreto. However, during the First World War, he reverted to his family name of Bliss, and was known afterwards as "Baron Bliss". He was apparently successful in his career, but it is not known how he obtained his fortune, whether due to business acumen, inheritance, or a combination thereof.

Bliss became paralysed from the waist down in 1911 at the age of 42, likely due to polio, and began using a wheelchair. Despite this, he remained active. He was apparently an avid sailor, but had his yacht confiscated for war purposes during the First World War. When the war ended, he was wealthy enough to retire to a lifetime of fishing and leisure; to that end, he ordered a new 120 ft twin screw yacht from the famous Scottish yacht designer Alfred Mylne which he christened Sea King II. In 1920, he sailed the yacht to the Bahamas, where he stayed for five years. Meanwhile, his wife Baroness Ethel Alice Bliss stayed in England, living off a portion of his fortune. The couple had no children.

Although he had some property there, he eventually grew tired of Bahamanian society and decided to move on. Leaving the Bahamas behind, he sailed to Trinidad and was there for a short while when he came down with a serious bout of food poisoning. Deciding to accept a previous invitation from his friend Willoughby Bullock, who was then Attorney General of British Honduras, he sailed westward, stopping briefly in Jamaica likely for medical attention, and arriving in the Belize City harbour on 14 January 1926.

Bliss's health appeared to improve over the next few weeks, and he spent much of this time sailing around the area in his launch, exploring the coastline and fishing. However, just days before his 57th birthday, his health took a turn for the worse, and doctors advised him that he was terminally ill. It was at this time that he decided he would leave the bulk of his fortune to the country, and signed a new draft of his will, dated 17 February. Several weeks later, he died on his yacht, never having landed on the Belizean mainland. He was buried in the former site of a Spanish fortress which was extremely damaged after the Battle of St. George's Caye in September 1798 in Belize City, what is now known as Bliss Park. This was a temporary arrangement, and he was later interred in a granite tomb near the sea, with a lighthouse nearby, built with funds from his estate. The burial instructions were explicitly stated in the will.

== The Bliss bequest ==
At the time of his death, Bliss's fortune was worth nearly £1 million (about BZ$1.8 million). About $480,000 was claimed by the United Kingdom in inheritance taxes. His will gave specific instructions on how the money was to be used to the benefit of the citizens of British Honduras. Aside from small lifetime annuities to his wife and relatives in England and to his personal staff, the remainder of the funds was placed in a trust, executed by the Governor of British Honduras, the Colonial Secretary, and the Attorney General.

The original money was to be invested in British company shares and securities, and only the interest earned could be spent, and even that could not be spent on churches, dance halls or schools, except agricultural and vocational ones. One-hundred pounds sterling was to be set aside annually for a regatta, which has since been held every year on Baron Bliss Day. A peculiar condition attached to the money was that no American may be a trustee or an employee of a trustee. No explanation was given.

Over the years, the trust has provided more than BZ$2 million to fund projects, including the Bliss Institute, Bliss School of Nursing, and other capital projects across the country. As of 2011, the fund was still worth roughly BZ$1.5 million.

== National Heroes and Benefactors Day ==
Soon after his death, the government declared 9 March to be Baron Bliss Day, a national public holiday. This was later renamed to National Heroes and Benefactors Day, and is now observed the Monday closest to 9 March, unless it falls on a Saturday or it has been moved by decree. In 2024 the holiday date was 11 March.
