= 1957 British Honduras general election =

- 20 March 1957

All 9 seats in the Legislative Assembly
- Turnout: 52.74%
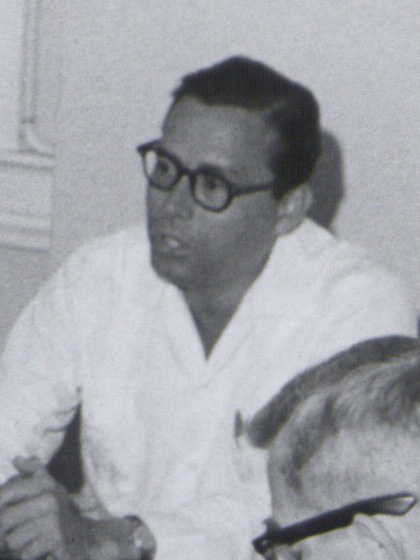
	First party
Leader	George Cadle Price
Party	PUP
Leader since	1956
Leader's seat	Belize North
Last election	8 seats
Seats won	9
Seat change	▲1
Popular vote	6,876
Percentage	61.32%
Swing	▼3.72
Majority party leader before election
George Cadle Price
PUP
Elected Majority party leader
George Cadle Price
PUP

General elections were held in British Honduras on 20 March 1957. The ruling People's United Party won all nine seats contested. This was the first of two occasions they would sweep the House. It was the PUP's first election under the leadership of George Cadle Price. Price would lead the party until 1996.

The Honduran Independence Party (HIP), a forerunner of the modern United Democratic Party, was founded the previous year by an anti-Price faction within the PUP led by former PUP leader Leigh Richardson. The party fielded five out of a possible nine candidates, but failed to win any seats.

The elections were the last for the pro-colonial National Party. Charles Westby, the NP's only successful candidate in the 1954 election, ran as an independent. The HIP and NP merged in 1958 to form the National Independence Party.

== Results ==
Party	Votes	%	Seats	+/–
People's United Party	6,876	61.32	9	+1
Honduran Independence Party	2,057	18.34	0	New
National Party	1,449	12.92	0	–1
Independents	832	7.42	0	0
Total	11,214	100.00	9	0
Valid votes	11,214	96.39		
Invalid/blank votes	420	3.61		
Total votes	11,634	100.00		
Registered voters/turnout	22,058	52.74		
Source: Elections and Boundaries Department

=== By division ===
Division	Electorate	Turnout	%	Political party	Candidate	Votes	%
Belize North	3,490	1,901	54.5	People's United Party	George Cadle Price		70.2
Belize North	3,490	1,901	54.5	National Party	Jaime Staines		28.4
Belize Rural	2,383	1,013	42.5	People's United Party	Louis Sylvestre		68.2
Belize Rural	2,383	1,013	42.5	Honduran Independence Party	Herman Jex		19.2
Belize Rural	2,383	1,013	42.5	National Party	Lindsay Burns		10.8
Belize South	2,767	1,648	59.6	People's United Party	Denbigh Jeffery		38.7
Belize South	2,767	1,648	59.6	Honduran Independence Party	Philip Goldson		38.6
Belize South	2,767	1,648	59.6	National Party	Herbert Fuller		21.5
Belize West	3,665	1,977	53.9	People's United Party	Albert Cattouse		57.4
Belize West	3,665	1,977	53.9	Honduran Independence Party	Leigh Richardson		26.7
Belize West	3,665	1,977	53.9	National Party	Lionel Francis		14.3
Cayo	2,019	1,044	51.7	People's United Party	Enrique De Paz		50.1
Cayo	2,019	1,044	51.7	Honduran Independence Party	Eduardo Espat		21.6
Cayo	2,019	1,044	51.7	National Party	Hamid Musa		6.7
Corozal	1,578	1,001	63.4	People's United Party	Santiago Ricalde		82.3
Corozal	1,578	1,001	63.4	Honduran Independence Party	Jose Leon Chin		15.3
Orange Walk	1,436	800	55.7	People's United Party	Victor Orellana		64.8
Orange Walk	1,436	800	55.7	National Party	William George		23.6
Orange Walk	1,436	800	55.7	Honduran Independence Party	George Flowers		7.9
Stann Creek	3,349	1,611	48.1	People's United Party	David McKoy		57.0
Stann Creek	3,349	1,611	48.1	Independent	Harry Stanely		14.7
Stann Creek	3,349	1,611	48.1	Independent	Lem Benguche		13.5
Stann Creek	3,349	1,611	48.1	Independent	Max Arzu		13.1
Toledo	1,371	639	46.6	People's United Party	Faustino Zuniga		46.2
Toledo	1,371	639	46.6	National Party	Bernard Avilez		26.0
Toledo	1,371	639	46.6	Independent	Charles Westby		25.4
