= 1954 British Honduras general election =

- 28 April 1954

All 9 seats in the Legislative Assembly
- Turnout: 70.41%
	First party	Second party
	PUP	NP
Leader	Leigh Richardson (acting)	Harrison Courtenay
Party	PUP	NP
Leader since	1953	1951
Leader's seat	Belize West	Did not run
Seats won	8	1
Popular vote	9,461	3,342
Percentage	65.04%	22.98%
Majority party leader before election
N/A
Elected Majority party leader
Leigh Richardson
PUP

General elections were held in British Honduras on 28 April 1954, the first held under universal suffrage. The new constitution replaced the Legislative Council with a Legislative Assembly, which had nine elected members, three officials and three appointed members. The result was a decisive victory for the pro-independence People's United Party, which won eight of the nine seats in a coalition with the General Workers' Union.

The pro-colonial National Party won the remaining seat, with NP candidate Charles Westby prevailing in the Toledo constituency.

== Background ==
Prior to 1954, there were only six elected seats in the British Honduras Legislative Assembly. Eligibility to vote was limited to British subjects, that had lived in the colony for at least a year, whom owned property worth over $96, paid more than $6 in property tax or had an annual salary of over $300.

In March 1954, a new constitution for British Honduras was introduced, guaranteeing universal suffrage and nine directly elected seats in the Legislative Assembly. There would also be 3 seats for people nominated by the Governor of British Honduras and 3 for paid officials. The two main camps contesting the election were the anti-colonial People's United Party with the General Worker's Union and the pro-British National Party with independents.

Due to concerns about Communist influence from neighbouring South American countries, the Governor Patrick Muir Renison put out a broadcast threatening to cancel the elections if "emotionalism" did not cease. He later stated at a news conference that: "the election thus far has been singularly free of foreign intervention."

== Results ==
Party	Votes	%	Seats
People's United Party	9,461	65.04	8
National Party	3,342	22.98	1
Independents	1,743	11.98	0
Total	14,546	100.00	9
Valid votes	14,546	99.32	
Invalid/blank votes	100	0.68	
Total votes	14,646	100.00	
Registered voters/turnout	20,801	70.41	
Source: Elections and Boundaries Department

=== By division ===
The results for each division is as follows:

Division	Turnout	Political party	Candidate	Votes	%
Belize North	2,474	People's United Party	George Price		75.0
Belize North	2,474	Independent	John Smith		25.0
Belize Rural	1,445	People's United Party	Herman Jex		51.8
Belize Rural	1,445	Independent	Fred Hunter		39.0
Belize Rural	1,445	National Party	MBL Wilson		9.3
Belize South	1,854	People's United Party	Phillip Goldson		52.7
Belize South	1,854	National Party	Herbert Fuller		47.3
Belize West	2,626	People's United Party	Leigh Richardson		71.7
Belize West	2,626	National Party	Lionel Francis		22.5
Belize West	2,626	Independent	Frederick Westby		5.8
Cayo	1,300	People's United Party	Enrique De Paz		85.5
Cayo	1,300	Independent	S.A. McKinstry		14.5
Corozal	1,111	People's United Party	Jose Leon Chin		63.2
Corozal	1,111	Independent	William Gegg		36.8
Orange Walk	878	People's United Party	George Flowers		64.6
Orange Walk	878	National Party	William George		35.4
Stann Creek	2,023	People's United Party	Nathaniel Cacho		60.9
Stann Creek	2,023	National Party	Catarino Benguche		39.1
Toledo	935	National Party	Charles Westby		54.0
Toledo	935	People's United Party	George Gardiner		46.0
