= Maritime Museum (Belize) =

Museum in Belize City, Belize

Coordinates: 17.495380°N 88.186722°W

- Established: 1996
- Location: Belize City, Belize

The Maritime Museum is a museum in Belize City, Belize. The museum is located at the North Front St, Marine Terminal at Swing Bridge in the former fire station. The museum opened in 1996.

Along with the adjacent Coastal Zone museum, their mission is to educate visitors about Belize's seafaring and shipbuilding history through a series of old documents, model boats, paintings and other displays. The Coastal Zone museum explores coral reef ecology in Belize.
