= Haulover Creek =

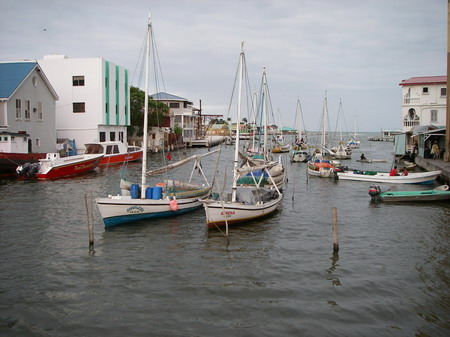
- Haulover Creek littered by traditional wooden fishing boats

Location
- Country: Belize

Physical characteristics
- Source
  - location: Confluence of Belize River and Bourdon Canal
  - coordinates: 17°29′N 88°11′W
- Mouth
  - location: Caribbean Sea at Belize City
  - coordinates: 17°32′N 88°14′W
- Basin size: Caribbean Sea

Haulover Creek is a coastal stream that runs through the center of Belize City and discharges into the Caribbean Sea. It is known for being the inlet of the Belize River, and separating the northern and southern areas of Belize City. There are multiple bridges built across it such as the Swing Bridge (Belize), which is the oldest of its kind in Central America, and the Belcan Bridge, which is used as the finishing line for the annual La Ruta Maya river challenge.

== History ==
This creek has been used by fishing boats to easily access the center of Belize City and the Caribbean Sea. The creek still hosts the fleet of traditional fishing wooden boats (mostly from Sarteneja, Chunox and Copper bank) moored on posts to this present day (while the remaining Belize city wooden boats known as "sandlighters" that used to dock here now anchor in the north coast of Belize city). Its name is believed to be attained from those who had to "haul" their cattle over the creek with ropes prior to the construction of the swing bridge in 1922. The creek is now famously used for easily accessing the Caribbean Sea from the city as observed by the hosting of the water taxi to distant islands such as San Pedro and Ambergris Caye, and the sighting of many fishing boats anchored in the stream.

== Pollution and flooding ==
Haulover Creek is a noted high risk area for flooding and water pollution in Belize City.

== See also ==
- Swing Bridge (Belize)
- Belize River
