= Street Art Festival in Belize City =

Street Art Festival in Belize City (Street Fest)
- Status: active
- Genre: Art festival

The Street Art Festival in Belize City, commonly known by locals as "Street Fest", is an annual arts festival that occurs particularly on Albert Street in Belize City and typically happens in late February. It is a nationwide event where a variety of entertainers all unify to showcase performances, visual arts, street arts and other creative art forms. The event is annually sponsored by the Institute of Creative Arts and the Belize City Council whereas the organizer of the event is Karen Vernon. The goal of the street art festival is to generally provide a national arena for artists to showcase their finished pieces. Over the past years the festival has gained recognition and momentum due to its features such as: artwork pieces, handmade items and accessories, different foods, pastries, also tattoo booths and children's corner.

== See also ==
- Culture of Belize
