= Swing Bridge (Belize) =

Bridge in Belize

Coordinates: 17.4954°N 88.1870°W

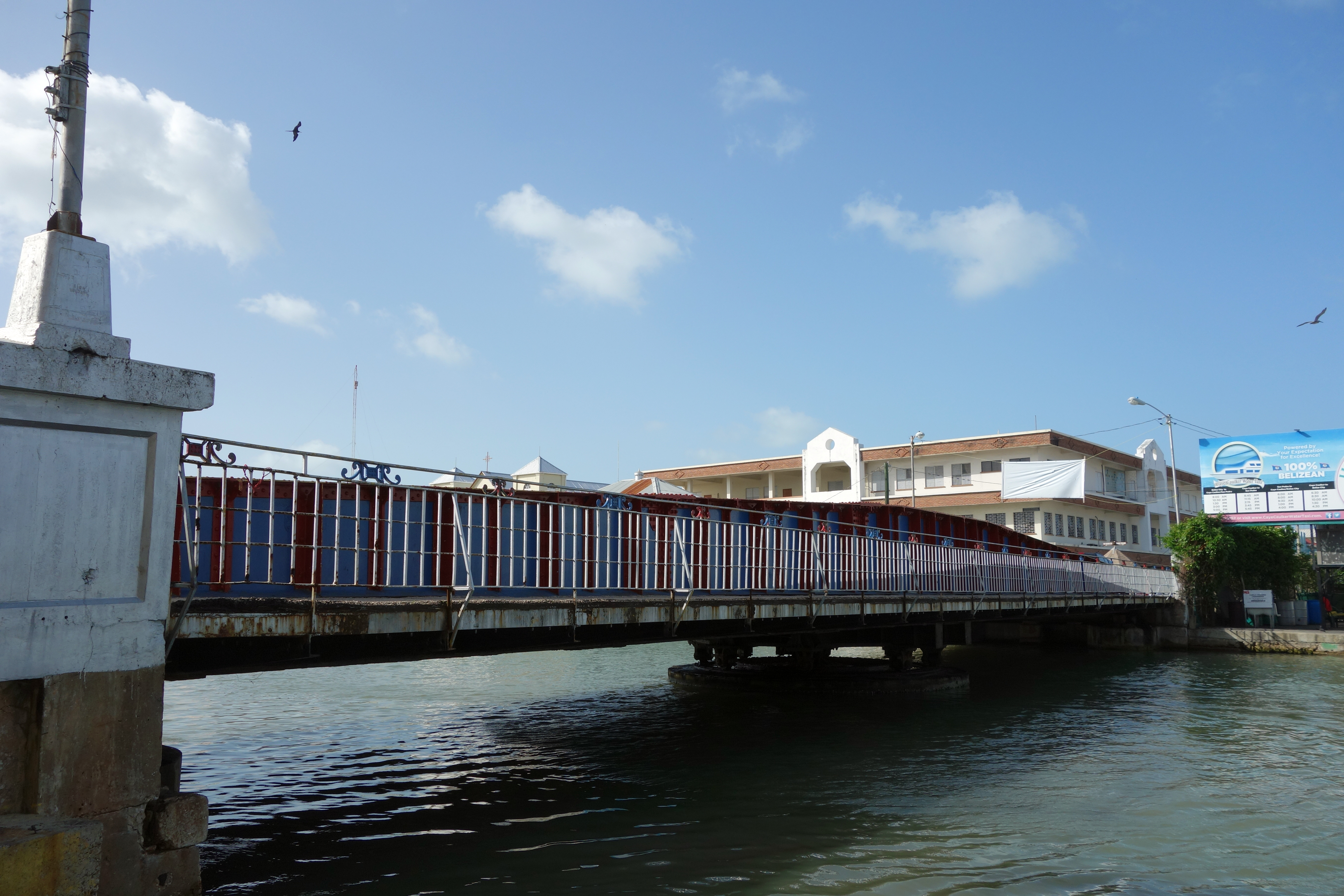
Swing Bridge in Belize City in 2015

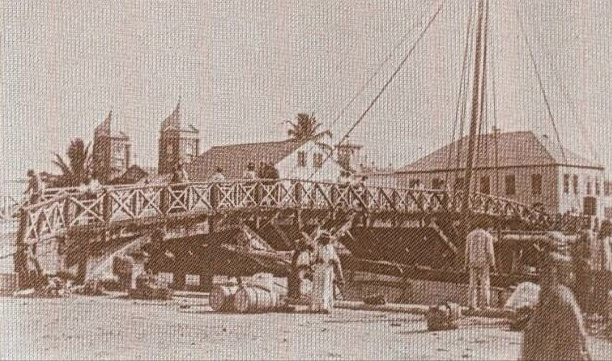
The original bridge that connected the North and South Side of Belize City (1859)

The Belize City Swing Bridge is a swing bridge located in downtown Belize City, Belize. It connects the north side of Belize City with the south side and spans Haulover Creek, a tributary of the Belize River.

A tourist destination and historical landmark of Belize, it is the oldest swing bridge in Central America and one of the few manually operated swing bridges in the world still in use. The Maritime Museum of Belize is located nearby.

== History ==
Constructed in Liverpool, England, and brought to Belize City by a United States company in New Orleans, it was built to allow sailing fishing boats with tall masts to pass the bridge and continue up the river to offer supplies and services to the city. The construction of the new bridge replaced several wooden bridges that had been built by locals during the mid-19th century to cross the Haulover Creek.

Haulover Creek is actually an inlet for the Belize River but was called so because cattlemen had to pull their cattle across the creek with ropes ("hauling over the creek"). The bridge was constructed in 1922 and installation was finished in 1923. It was manually opened by four men cranking by hand. The bridge was swung twice a day, once in the morning and again in the evening, to allow boat traffic through.

== Renovations ==
The bridge was damaged in the category 5 1931 hurricane that hit the city. It was said to have moved into the street. Again damaged by Hurricane Hattie in 1961 and by Hurricane Mitch in 1998, repairs were made after Mitch and further restoration was done in the first decade of the 21st century. Talks were made about automating the bridge however locals have balked at this realizing it would take away a major tourist destination in the city. In 1987, an approved donation by China, resulted in the design and thereafter, fabrication of a modern replacement bridge for the old Belize City swing bridge location. It was shipped to Belize in 1989 but never arrived. It was returned to China because Belize established diplomatic relations with Taiwan that year at the time of the shipment.

== Operation ==
The bridge requires a minimum of four men to crank it by hand until it is perpendicular with Haulover Creek. After traffic has passed, it is hand cranked again until it has been returned to its parallel position with the creek. Traffic is halted for well over an hour before the process is completed. Since 2007, the bridge is only manually opened by special request as traffic on Haulover Creek is not as heavy as before.

== In film ==
The Belize City Swing Bridge was shown in the 1980 film, The Dogs of War, starring Christopher Walken. Scenes for the fictional African country of Zangaro were shot in Belize City, Belize. The bridge was positioned parallel to the creek and then manually swung back into position in the scene.
