= Honduran Independence Party =

The Honduran Independence Party was a short-lived 1950s political party in Belize. It was essentially a splinter group of the People's United Party (PUP).

== Background: Central Committee resignations ==
A convention held by the People's United Party on September 27, 1956 settled a long political dispute that had hindered the party's development for some time. 10 members of the Central executive of the PUP, led by Leigh Richardson and Phillip Goldson, resigned and vowed to form their own political party.

== Formation and leaders ==
The HIP was formed on October 4, 1956, and elected its leaders on October 15. They included:

- Party Leader Leigh Richardson
- Deputy Phillip Goldson
- Chairman William Coffin
- Vice Chairman Frank Tench

== Aims ==
- Belizean self-government within the Commonwealth
- Higher standard of living for all with more training and opportunity
- Cooperation with management and labour for the betterment of the country.

== Reception by Belizeans ==
As the HIP prepared to contest the 1957 general election, Belizeans had a few questions for them. How serious was the PUP split, and could it be repaired? If the party wanted independence, even eventually, as the name suggested, why split with the PUP in the first place? And just what the heck was "Honduras", anyway? (Shoman). A puzzled electorate offered nearly 18% of its votes, but no seats, to the new party, placing them second behind the victorious PUP.

== Devolution ==
A discouraged Richardson resigned as Leader in February 1958 and left for Trinidad. Goldson carried the party along a little further, but he had no choice but to meet with members of the National Party (Belize) (NP) to ask for a merger. The details were worked out in early summer, and the HIP was dissolved on June 25, 1958 (one day before the NP) and merged to form the National Independence Party (Belize) on July 1.

== See also ==
- National Party (Belize)
- People's United Party
- National Independence Party (Belize)
- United Democratic Party (Belize)
