= Bliss Institute =

Coordinates: 17.493477°N 88.186068°W

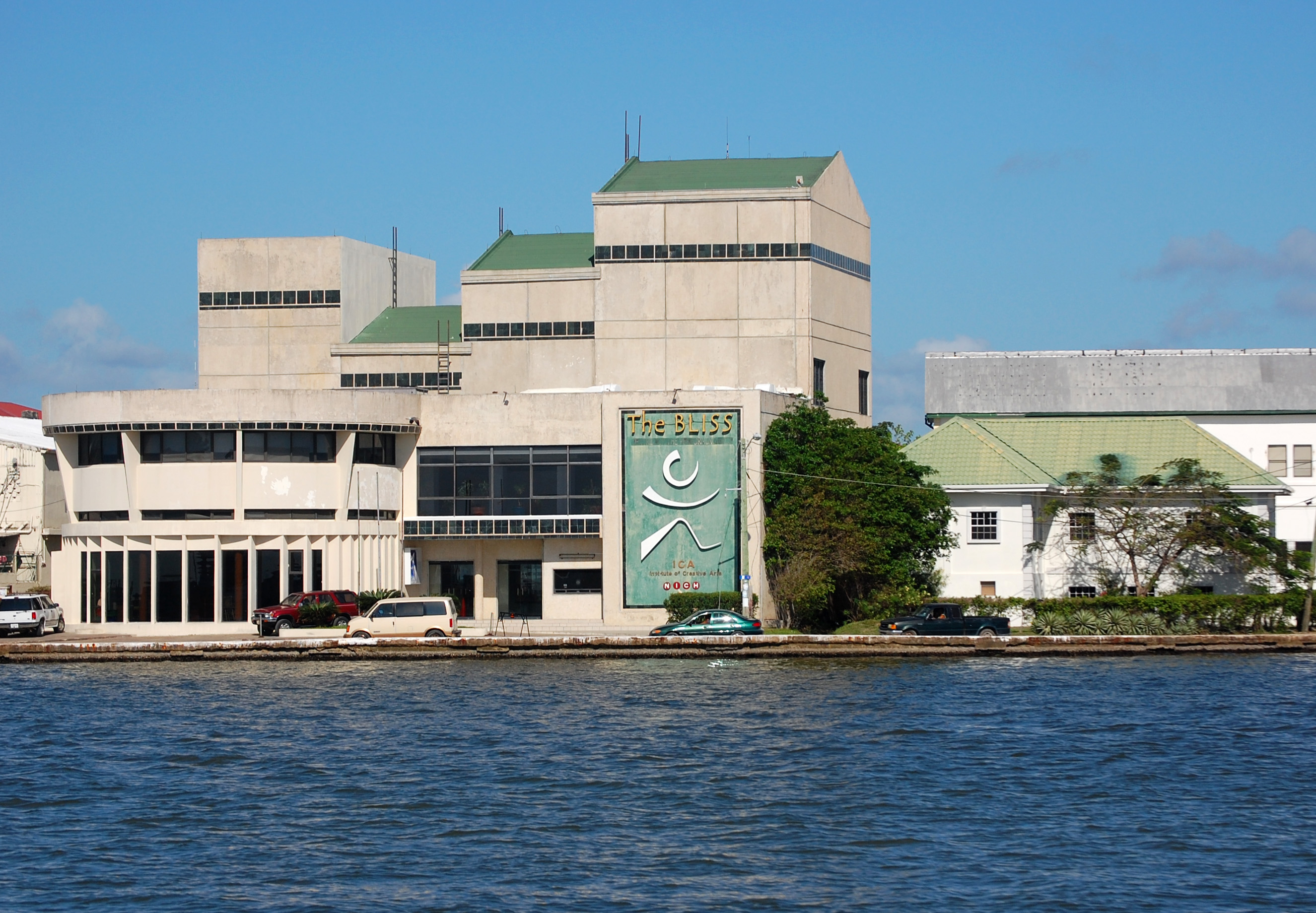
- The Bliss Institute in Belize City after its remodelling in 2003
- Established: 1953
- Location: Belize City, Belize
- Type: Theatre, Museum, National Arts Council
- Collections: Archaeological finds from Caracol

The Bliss Institute is a theatre, museum, and National Arts Council in the cultural centre of Belize City. It is named after Baron Bliss.

The original construction started in 1953 and finished one year later. The architectural design was done in a modernist international style. The program consisted of a library, an auditorium, an exhibition area and reading rooms. The gallery for the auditorium resembled the prow of a ship. The trusteeship of Baron Bliss invested $251,829 dls in the construction of the building and $7,532 in furniture.

It was almost all refurbished in 2003 by a Mexican construction company, becoming the Bliss Centre for the Performing Arts, housing the headquarters of the ICA (Institute of Creative Arts).

The museum contains a number of archaeological finds from the Maya site of Caracol. The theatre stages numerous concerts and a number of artistic exhibitions and political events are held in the complex.

== Gallery ==
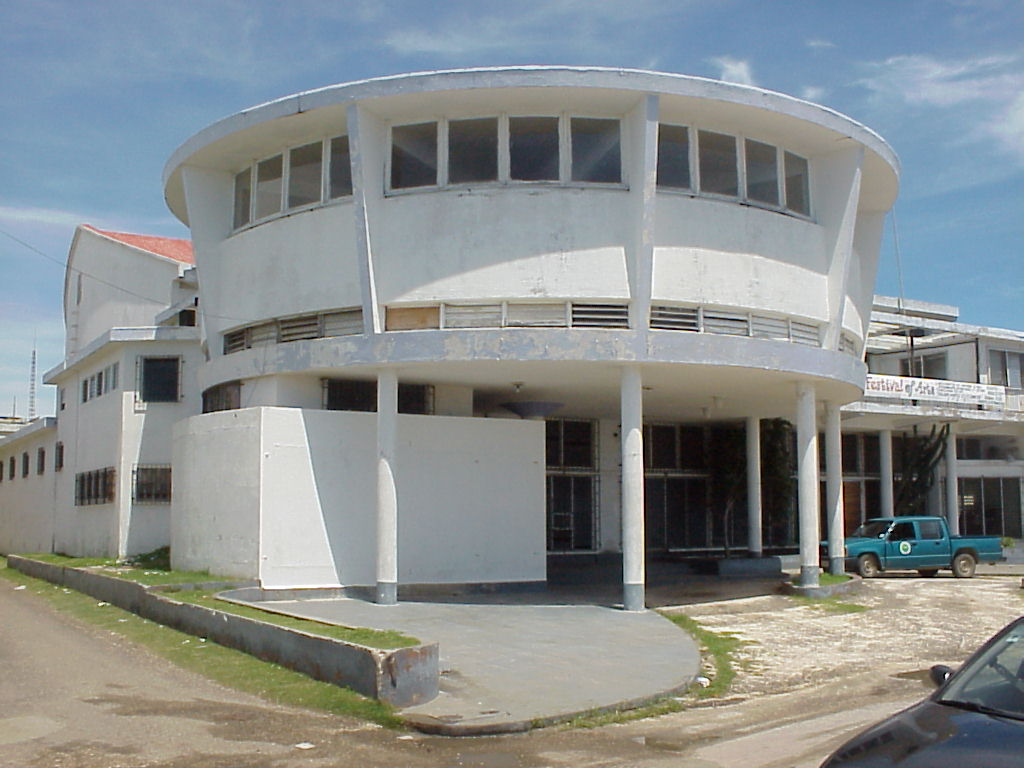
Bliss Institute 1999, prior to renovations

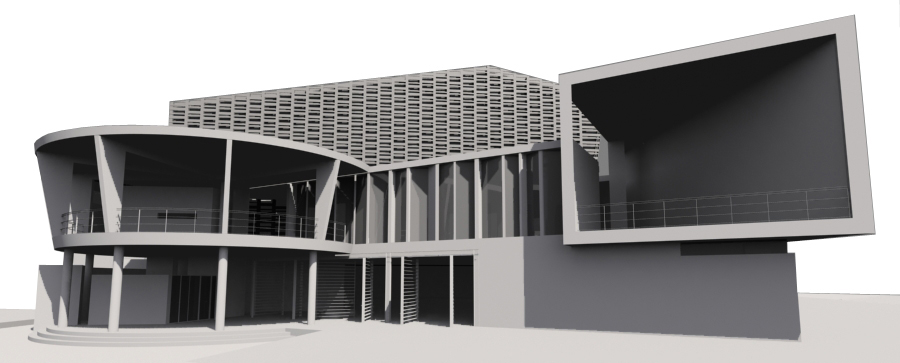
Proposal for renovation. Bliss Institute, Belize city. 2000 Source: Bachelor's Thesis Architectural Degree by Rafael A. Balboa
