= National Party (Belize) =

Political party in Belize

The National Party of Belize (NP) was a political party established mainly to fight the anti-colonialist movement propagated by the People's United Party (PUP). It had only minimal success and was eventually deregistered.

The Party was established on August 21, 1951 and dissolved on June 26, 1958.

== Leaders ==
- President: W.H. Courtenay
- Vice President: Herbert Fuller
- Secretary: E.O.B. Barrow
- Chairman: Lionel Francis

== Objectives ==
- to secure and extend the liberties, project the interests and develop the national life and prosperity of the people of Belize by all constitutional means;
- work for the political, economic, social and cultural progress of the country;
- develop the political life of the citizenry by shaping public opinion in party meetings and literature;
- identify and support suitable members for elections;
- secure the development of a planned policy for social and economic future of Belize.

Despite these ideals, the party more often acted against any change, because it consisted of persons who were against the type of radical development proposed by the People's United Party (which was formed a year earlier).

== Record in elections ==
- 1952 City Council election: Herbert Fuller named president after two attempts to elect a president failed.
- 1954 General Election: Fielded seven candidates for nine seats; Toledo's Charles Westby elected.
- 1956 City Council election: Fuller and Floss Cassasola elected from slate.
- 1957 General Election: no persons elected.

== Reception by Belizeans ==
Generally, most Belizeans felt that the National Party was hastily put together and offered no real constructive opposition to the PUP, who themselves were going through internal turmoil and had been co-opted by the British. NP members came from among the elite merchants, colonial supporters and members of the colonial apparatus who were against change and this hamstrung the Party in its attempts to gain favor with the Belizean people.

The Party was terminated by resolution at a meeting of June 26, 1958. It merged with the Honduran Independence Party (HIP) a few days later to form the National Independence Party (Belize) (NIP).
