= Order of Distinction (Belize) =

Awarded by Belize
- Type: Order
- Established: 16 August 1991
- Eligibility: Heads of State whom Belize wishes to honour
- Chancellor: The Governor-General of Belize

Precedence
- Next (higher): Order of Belize
- Next (lower): None
- Ribbon bar of the order

The Order of Distinction is an Order of Merit of Belize. It is a single rank order with sash and breast star. Recipients are entitled to the postnominals "ODB".

== Recipients ==
- Vincent Siew, former vice president of Taiwan
