= Belize City =

Largest city in Belize

- City
- City of Belize
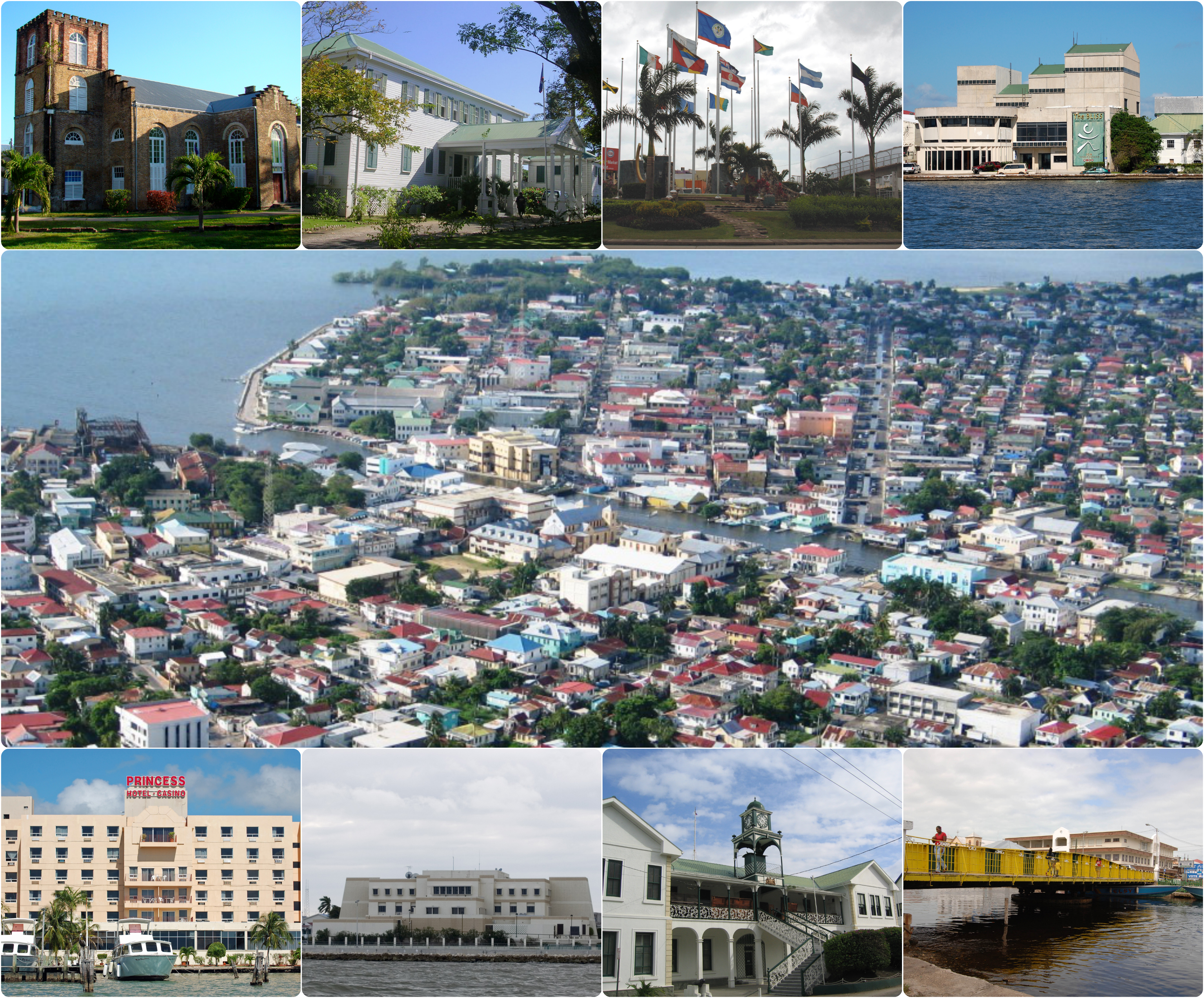
- From top; left to right: St. John's Cathedral, the Government House, the CARICOM Flag Monument, the Bliss Institute, Aerial of Belize City, Princess Hotel and Casino, the Central Bank of Belize, High Court Building and the Swing Bridge

- Flag
- Etymology: From the Belize River, corruption of Balis, word that comes from the Mayan language.
- Nicknames: The Old Capital, The City
- Location within Belize Location within the Caribbean Location within Central America Location within North America Location within Earth
- Coordinates: 17°29′55″N 88°11′19″W
- Country: Belize
- District: Belize
- Settled: 1638 (as a camp); 1650s (as a port); 1783 (as a town)
- Incorporated: 1783 (as capital); 1981 (as a city)
- Founder: Peter Wallace

Government
  - Type: Mayor–council
  - Body: City Council
  - Mayor: Bernard Wagner (PUP)
  - Belize Parliament: 10 constituencies: Haylock; Musa; Mahler; Daly; Chang; Fonseca; Hyde; Panton; G. Usher; H.C. Usher

Area
  - Total: 13.8 sq mi (35.7 km^{2})
- Elevation: 0 ft (0 m)

Population (2025 estimate)
  - Total: 75,592
  - Rank: 1st
  - Density: 5,480/sq mi (2,120/km^{2})
- Demonym: Belizean
- Time zone: UTC−6 (GMT-6)
- Website: belizecitycouncil.org

Belize City is the largest city in Belize. It was once the capital of the former British Honduras. According to the 2022 census, Belize City has a population of 63,999 people. It is at the mouth of the Haulover Creek, which is a distributary of the Belize River. The Belize River empties into the Caribbean Sea eight kilometres (five miles) from Belize City on the Philip Goldson Highway on the coast of the Caribbean. The city is the country's principal port and its financial and industrial hub. The city was almost entirely destroyed in October 1961 when Hurricane Hattie swept ashore. It was the capital of British Honduras (as Belize was then named) until the government was moved to the new capital of Belmopan in 1970.

== History ==
Belize City was founded as "Belize Town" in 1638 by English lumber harvesters. It had been a small Maya settlement called Holzuz. (Note: Jolsus in modern Mayan orthography.) Belize Town was ideal for the English as a central post because it was on the sea and a natural outlet for local rivers and creeks down which the British shipped logwood and mahogany. Belize Town also became the home of the thousands of African slaves brought in by the English (later the British, beginning in 1707) to toil in the forestry industry. It was the coordination site for the 1798 Battle of St. George's Caye, won by the British against would-be invaders, and the home of the local courts and government officials up to the 1970s. For this reason, historians often say that "the capital was the colony", because the centre of British control was here.

This sentiment remains true today. Even though people like Antonio Soberanis Gómez, George Price and Evan X Hyde all lobbied to take their movements outside, and other ethnic groups such as the Garifuna and Mestizos sprang up elsewhere in the country, people looked to Belize Town for guidance.

=== Natural disasters ===
Belize City has been directly struck by two hurricanes since 1900, the 1931 hurricane and the 1961 Hurricane Hattie, and at various times areas of the city have burnt down, the most recent being fires in 1999 and 2004. The city was also hit hard by Hurricane Richard in 2010 and by the 2016 Hurricane Earl. Fires on the Northside and Southside have burnt out great stretches of housing, but the fire department was able to quench most of these. The city is also susceptible to flooding in the rainy season.

== Location and geographic setting ==
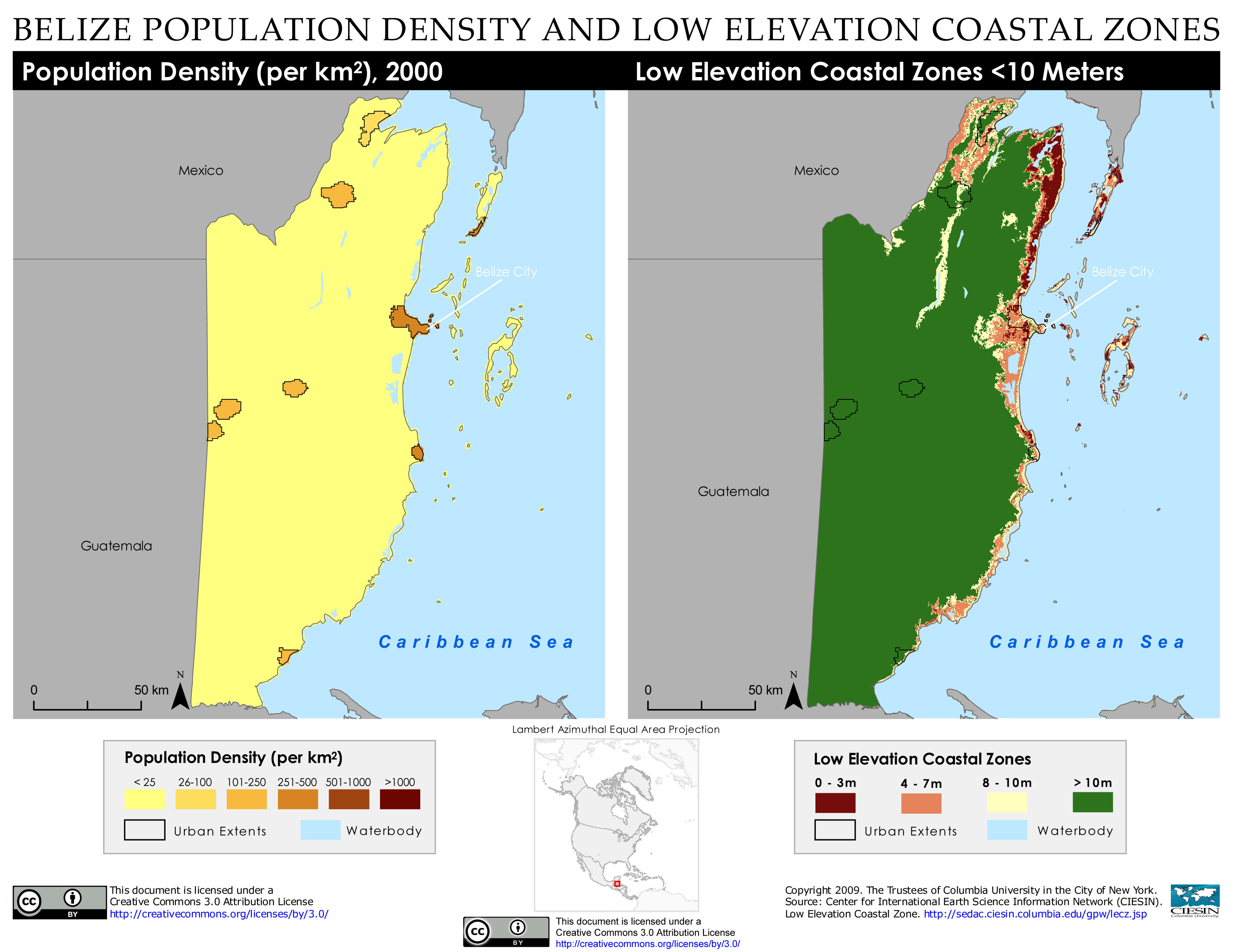
Belize population density and low elevation coastal zones. Belize City is especially vulnerable to sea level rise.

Belize City spreads out to Mile 6 on the George Price Highway and to Mile 5 on the Philip Goldson Highway, at the Haulover Bridge. The city proper is usually divided into two areas: Northside, bounded by Haulover Creek and ending in the east at the Fort George area, and Southside, extending to the outskirts of the city and the port area including downtown. Politically, it is divided into ten constituencies.

=== Cityscape ===
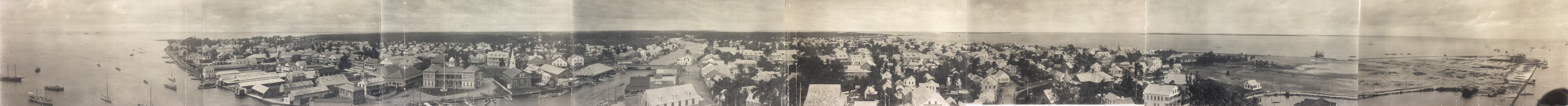
Belize City, c. 1914

Freetown, the westernmost constituency on Northside, is home to the Belama, Coral Grove, Buttonwood Bay and Vista Del Mar suburbs. Within the city proper it extends up to around the former Belize Technical College area.

Caribbean Shores includes Kings' Park, a small suburb north and west of Freetown Road, West Landivar, home to two of the University of Belize's three city campuses, and residential University Heights.

Pickstock inhabits the banks of the Haulover Creek extending to Barrack Road. St. John's Cathedral stands on the southern end of Albert Street. St. John's is the oldest Anglican Church in Central America, and one of the oldest buildings in Belize. The orange bricks came to Belize aboard British ships as ballast. Construction began in 1812, and the church was completed in 1820. St. John's is the only Anglican cathedral in the world outside England where the crowning of kings took place.

Fort George is perhaps the most colonial area in the city and contains Memorial Park, the Baron Bliss Grave and Baron Bliss Lighthouse and the Museum of Belize.

On the Southside, Lake Independence, Collet and Port Loyola are home to some of the city's poorest residents. "London bridges", rickety wooden pallets linking dwellings, and low-strung poles are not uncommon here. On the east side of Central American Boulevard are Mesopotamia, Queen's Square and Albert, which are slightly better. Albert contains the downtown streets of Albert and Regent Streets.

=== Bridges and other infrastructure ===
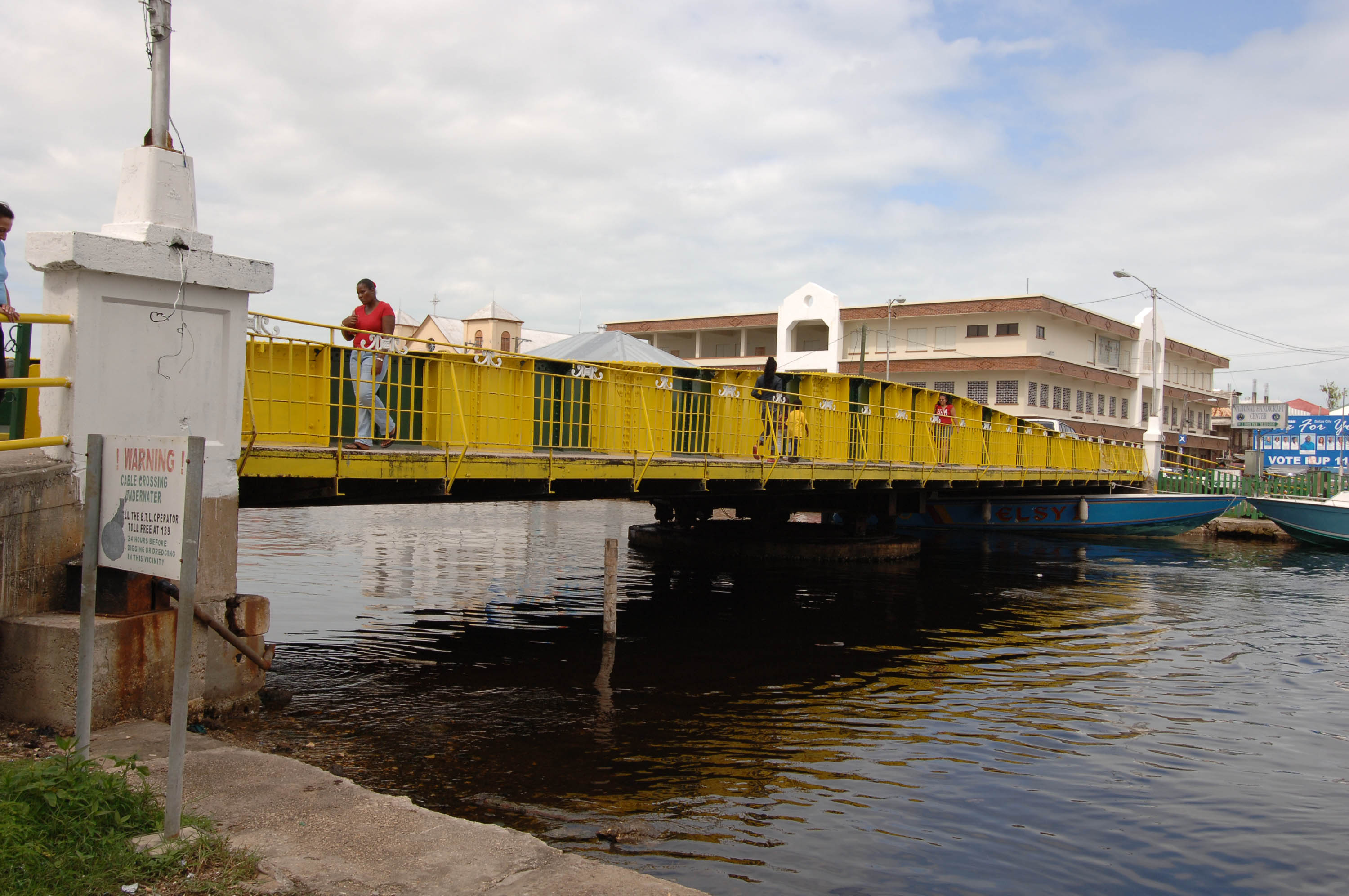
The Swing Bridge in Belize City is the only functioning, manually operated swing bridge in the world.

The divisions of the city are linked by four bridges: the Swing Bridge, at Market Square and North Front Street; the Belchina Bascule Bridge at the Douglas Jones Street and Youth for the Future Drive junction; the Belcan Bridge linking Central American Boulevard and the roundabout leading to the Northern Highway and Caribbean Shores, and a recently built fourth bridge linking Fabers' Road and the southern Lake Independence/Port Loyola area to the Belama and northwest suburbs of the city. Numerous smaller bridges link individual streets.

The three main canals running in Belize City, are Haulover Creek, Burdon Canal and Collet Canal. All of them run through Southside.

== Climate ==
Belize City features a tropical monsoon climate, with very warm to hot and humid conditions throughout the course of the year. The city has a lengthy wet season that runs from May through February and a short dry season covering the remaining two months. However, as is the characteristic of several cities with tropical monsoon climates, Belize City sees some precipitation during its dry season. March is Belize City's driest month with only 48 millimetres or 1.9 inches of rainfall observed, a somewhat unusual month for a city with this climate type. Typically the driest month for a city with a tropical monsoon climate is the month after the winter solstice, which in Belize City would be January. Average monthly temperatures remain relatively constant throughout the course of the year, ranging from 24 to 28 °C (75.2 to 82.4 °F).

Climate data for Belize City (Philip S. W. Goldson International Airport) 1991–2020, extremes 1866–present
Month	Jan	Feb	Mar	Apr	May	Jun	Jul	Aug	Sep	Oct	Nov	Dec	Year
Record high °C (°F)	34.2 (93.6)	34.7 (94.5)	37.3 (99.1)	37.7 (99.9)	37.0 (98.6)	35.7 (96.3)	33.8 (92.8)	35.0 (95.0)	35.3 (95.5)	34.0 (93.2)	33.3 (91.9)	34.0 (93.2)	37.7 (99.9)
Mean daily maximum °C (°F)	27.9 (82.2)	28.8 (83.8)	29.8 (85.6)	31.2 (88.2)	31.9 (89.4)	31.7 (89.1)	31.5 (88.7)	31.8 (89.2)	31.8 (89.2)	30.6 (87.1)	29.2 (84.6)	28.3 (82.9)	30.4 (86.7)
Daily mean °C (°F)	24.3 (75.7)	25.2 (77.4)	26.1 (79.0)	27.7 (81.9)	28.5 (83.3)	28.7 (83.7)	28.4 (83.1)	28.5 (83.3)	28.3 (82.9)	27.2 (81.0)	25.6 (78.1)	24.7 (76.5)	26.9 (80.4)
Mean daily minimum °C (°F)	20.6 (69.1)	21.5 (70.7)	22.4 (72.3)	24.2 (75.6)	25.2 (77.4)	25.7 (78.3)	25.3 (77.5)	25.3 (77.5)	24.9 (76.8)	23.9 (75.0)	22.0 (71.6)	21.2 (70.2)	23.5 (74.3)
Record low °C (°F)	11.0 (51.8)	11.5 (52.7)	10.9 (51.6)	15.0 (59.0)	19.0 (66.2)	20.8 (69.4)	20.7 (69.3)	21.0 (69.8)	19.3 (66.7)	16.1 (61.0)	14.4 (57.9)	12.0 (53.6)	10.9 (51.6)
Average rainfall mm (inches)	141.4 (5.57)	64.7 (2.55)	41.0 (1.61)	58.0 (2.28)	131.8 (5.19)	236.4 (9.31)	180.2 (7.09)	195.0 (7.68)	229.8 (9.05)	305.5 (12.03)	235.8 (9.28)	150.9 (5.94)	1,970.5 (77.58)
Average rainy days (≥ 1.0 mm)	10	6	4	4	7	12	14	14	16	16	13	12	128
Average relative humidity (%)	83	82	79	77	79	82	83	84	84	83	84	84	82
Mean monthly sunshine hours	199	203	239	256	257	197	226	237	178	196	180	190	2,558
Source 1: National Meteorological Service of Belize, Meteo Climat (record highs and lows)
Source 2: Deutscher Wetterdienst (sun, 1961–1990, humidity 1975–1989) (Note: Station ID for Belize/Phillip Goldston INTL. Airport is 78583 Use this station ID to locate the sunshine duration)

== Educational institutions ==
Belize City has more educational institutions at every level than any other city in Belize. Most city children in Belize attend high school. The only three schools that are not coeducational are on the Northside: Saint John's College (boys), Saint Catherine's Academy (girls) and Pallotti High School (girls). One Southside school that was previously all girls, Sadie Vernon Technical (Belize Continuation), became coeducational in 2005.

There are three other private schools in Belize City: Belize Elementary School and its continuation Belize High School behind it, both on Princess Margret Drive, and the Hummingbird Elementary School.

== Culture ==
Belize City's culture is considered similar to that of Caribbean capital cities such as St. George's, Grenada, or Georgetown, Guyana. The city has the hustle and bustle one would associate with a city of 70,800. Notable cultural events include Garifuna Settlement Day (November 19), Belize City Carnival (September), Baron Bliss Day (March 9).

Museums in the city include the Bliss Institute, the Maritime Museum and the Museum of Belize. There is an annual Street Art Festival.

== Economy ==
The majority of working Belizeans travel to work in downtown offices or else ply their trade on the street sides. Belize City is home to branches of all the major banks of Belize and the Central Bank, as well as nearly all insurance centres, marketplaces and the like. Belize City is the hub for both national and international air, sea and road travel.

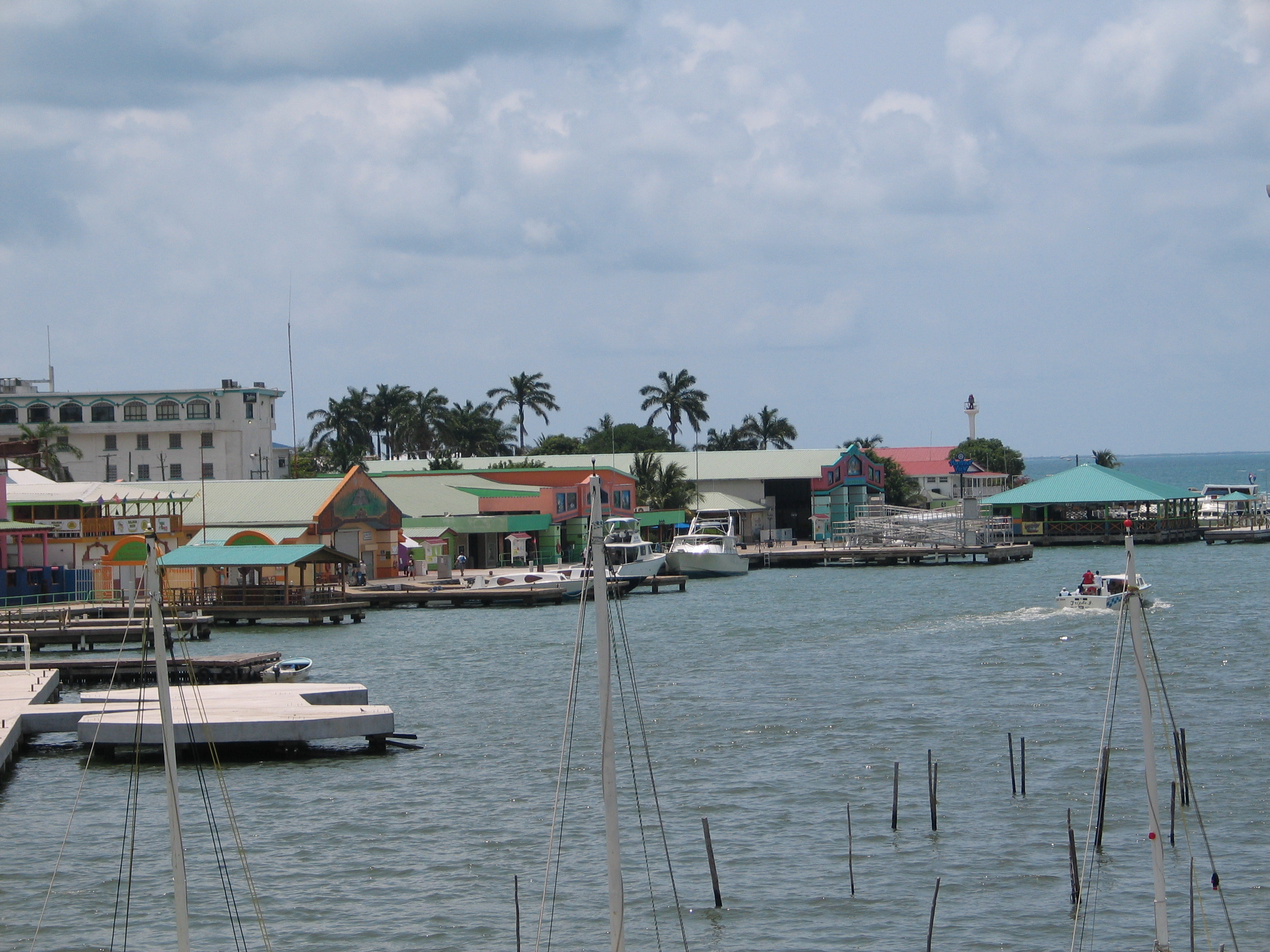
Belize Litoral.

=== Port of Belize ===
The city is home to the Port of Belize, the country's main port facility.

== Government ==
Belize City is operated by a mayor-council form of government. The Belize City Council is composed of 10 councillors (generally reflecting the ten constituencies of Belize City) and a mayor, all elected in municipal elections held every third year in March. After the most recent municipal elections in 2024, the mayor is Bernard Wagner of the People's United Party.

The city is also home to the House of Culture, formerly the official residence of the Governor-General of Belize until 1984. The Supreme Court of Belize still sits in Belize City.

== Transportation ==
Belize City will have railway lines southwestward to Spanish Lookout via Belmopan and northward to Orange Walk Town. Feasibility studies are being conducted by CRECG.

=== Air travel ===
The city is served by Philip S. W. Goldson International Airport, in Ladyville, northwest of Belize City, and by Belize City Municipal Airport, within the city itself.

== Sister cities ==
- Greensburg, United States
- Ann Arbor, United States
- Evanston, United States
- Kaohsiung, Taiwan
- Yeosu, South Korea
- Prairie View, United States
- San Benito, Guatemala

== Notable residents ==
- Moses Michael Levi Barrow (born Jamal Michael Barrow; 1978), better known by his stage name Shyne, Belizean rapper and politician
- Isaiah Emmanuel Morter

== See also ==
- Karl Heusner Memorial Hospital
- List of Belize-related topics
