= British Honduras =

British colony (1787–1981)

Coordinates: 17°4′N 88°42′W

British Settlements on the Bay of Honduras (1783–1862) Crown Colony of British Honduras (1862–1973) Belize (1973–1981)
- 1783–1981
- Flag (1919–1981) Coat of arms (1907–1967)
- Anthem: God Save The King (1783–1837; 1901–1952); God Save The Queen (1837–1901; 1952–1983)
- Status: British settlement (1783–1862) (Note: The British first settled the region in the 1600s. However it remained unrecognised by the British and the Spanish. The settlement was recognised by the Spanish in the 1783 Treaty of Versailles and a crown representative was sent. British law was extended to the settlement in 1840.); Crown colony (Note: Formally declared a colony in 1862) of the United Kingdom (1862–1981)
- Capital: Belize City (1862–1971); Belmopan (1971–1981)
- Common languages: English, Spanish, Belizean Creole, Garifuna, Mayan languages
- Monarch
  - 1783–1820: George III
  - 1820–1830: George IV
  - 1830–1837: William IV
  - 1837–1901: Victoria
  - 1901–1910: Edward VII
  - 1910–1936: George V
  - 1936: Edward VIII
  - 1936–1952: George VI
  - 1952–1981: Elizabeth II
- Governor
  - 1787–1790: Edward Marcus Despard
  - 1980–1981: James Hennessey
- Legislature: Legislative Council
- History
  - Treaty of Versailles (1783): 25 November 1783
  - Colony: 12 May 1862
  - Crown colony: 1871
  - No longer governed by Colony of Jamaica: 31 October 1884
  - Self-governing: 1 January 1964
  - Renamed: 1 June 1973
  - Independence: 21 September 1981

Population
  - 1793: 2,493
  - 1861: 25,635
  - 1960: 90,343
- Currency: British Honduran dollar
Preceded by
Captaincy General of Guatemala
First Mexican Empire
Federal Republic of Central America
Captaincy General of Yucatán
Succeeded by
Belize

British Honduras (Note: Known by its full name British Settlements on the Bay of Honduras or British Settlements on the Yucatan Peninsula from 1787 to 1862.) was a Crown colony on the Caribbean coast of Central America — specifically located on the southeastern edge of the Yucatán Peninsula — from 1783 to 1964. In 1964, it became a self-governing colony and was renamed Belize from June 1973 until September 1981, when it gained full independence as Belize. British Honduras was the last continental colony of the United Kingdom in the Americas.

The colony grew out of the Treaty of Versailles (1783) between Britain and Spain, which gave the British rights to cut logwood between the Hondo and Belize rivers. The Convention of London (1786) expanded this concession to include the area between the Belize and Sibun rivers. In 1862, the Settlement of Belize in the Bay of Honduras was declared a British colony called British Honduras, and the Crown's representative was elevated to a lieutenant governor, subordinate to the governor of Jamaica.

== History ==
=== Baymen, enslaved Africans, and Shoremen ===
In the early seventeenth century, English and Dutch pirate merchants, defying the Spanish who claimed sovereignty over the entire Caribbean coast, engaged in "sporadic but fairly frequent" smuggling from the Bay of Honduras. Large quantities of indigo and logwood were supplied to their home markets. At some point, the English operators began surreptitiously cutting logwood, as opposed to merely seizing Spanish-cut logwood. Although clear primary sources are lacking, the first English logging settlement in the territory is generally attributed to Peter Wallace's 1638 landing at the mouth of Haulover Creek which runs through what is now Belize City.

As their interest turned in the 18th century from logwood to mahogany, the growing numbers of "Baymen" employed enslaved Africans, purchased in Jamaica and Bermuda. While they might be left in logging camps, without the whip-wielding drivers ubiquitous on large plantations elsewhere in the Americas, the enslaved were dependent on their owners for rations and supplies. Many of the enslaved maintained African ethnic identifications and cultural practices. Those of Ibo origin and descent were particularly numerous, a section of Belize being known as "Eboe Town."

Following the 1786 Convention of London, the Spanish, who had chased out the Baymen four times between 1717 and 1780, accepted the Baymen as logwood concessionaires on condition that Great Britain evacuate her subjects from the Miskito Coast to the south. London directed the newly appointed superintendent for the Bay area concessions, Colonel Edward Despard, to accommodate these Shoremen. In their petitions to London for his removal, the Baymen noted that Despard did so without "any distinction of age, sex, character, respectability, property or colour": land was distributed by lottery in which "the meanest mulatto or free negro has an equal chance".

To the suggestion from the Home Secretary, Lord Sydney, that it was impolitic to put "affluent settlers and persons of a different description, particularly people of colour" on an "equal footing", Despard replied "the laws of England ... know no such distinction". He characterised the wealthy cutters among the Baymen as an "arbitrary aristocracy", buttressing his argument with the results of the magistracy election in which he won a resounding majority on an unprecedented turnout. Unimpressed by his democratic mandate, and persuaded by the Baymen's entreaty that under "Despard's constitution" the "negroes in servitude, observing the now exalted status of their brethren of yesterday [the free, and now propertied, blacks among the Shoremen] would be induced to revolt, and the settlement must be ruined", in 1790 Sydney's successor, Lord Grenville, recalled Despard to London.

Despard's colour-blind policies were reversed: by the 1820s the settlement had seven legally distinct castes based on skin colour. Under this colour-bar system, free Creole people were denied full civil rights until, in 1831, the British Colonial Office threatened to dissolve the Baymen's legislative Public Meeting.

London officially ended slavery in the Bay in 1838. But the Baymen continued to control and command the labour of the free slaves for over a century by denying them access to land, and by ensuring their continued dependency through a system of truck wages.

=== Maya emigration and conflict ===
As the British consolidated their settlement and pushed deeper into the interior in search of mahogany in the late 18th century, they encountered resistance from the Maya. In the second half of the 19th century, however, a combination of events outside and inside the colony redefined the position of the Maya. During the Caste War of Yucatán, a devastating struggle that halved the population of the area between 1847 and 1855, thousands of refugees fled to British Honduras. The Legislative Assembly had given large landowners in the colony firm titles to their vast estates in 1855 but did not allow the Maya to own land. The Maya could only rent land or live on reservations. Nevertheless, most of the refugees were small farmers, who by 1857 were growing considerable quantities of sugar, rice, corn, and vegetables in the Northern District (now Corozal and Orange Walk districts). In 1857, the town of Corozal, then six years old, had 4,500 inhabitants, second in population only to Belize Town, which had 7,000 inhabitants. Some Maya who had fled the strife in the north, but had no wish to become British subjects, settled in the remote Yalbac Hills, just beyond the woodcutting frontier in the northwest.

By 1862, about 1,000 Maya established themselves in 10 villages in this area, with the center in San Pedro. One group of Maya, led by Marcos Canul, attacked a mahogany camp on the Bravo River in 1866, demanding ransom for their prisoners and rent for their land. A detachment of soldiers from the West India Regiments (WIR) sent to San Pedro was defeated by the Maya later that year. Early in 1867, more than 300 WIR troops marched into the Yalbac Hills and destroyed several Mayan villages, provision stores, and granaries in an attempt to drive them out of the district. The Maya returned, however, and in April 1870, Canul and his men marched into Corozal and occupied the town. Two years later, Canul and 150 men attacked the barracks at Orange Walk. After several hours of fighting, Canul's group retired. Canul, mortally wounded, died on 1 September 1872. That battle was the last serious attack on the colony. In the 1880s and 1890s, Mopán and Kekchí Maya fled from forced labor in Guatemala and came to British Honduras. They settled in several villages in southern British Honduras, mainly around San Antonio in Toledo District. The Maya could use Crown lands set aside as reservations, but they did have rights over the lands.

Under the policy of indirect rule, a system of elected alcaldes (mayors), adopted from Spanish local government, linked these Maya to the colonial administration. However, the remoteness of the area of British Honduras in which they settled, combined with their largely subsistence way of life, resulted in the Mopán and Kekchí Maya maintaining more of their traditional way of life and becoming less assimilated into the colony than the Maya of the north. The Mopán and Kekchí Maya maintained their languages and a strong sense of identity. But in the north, the distinction between Maya and Spanish was increasingly blurred, and a Mestizo culture emerged. In different ways and to different degrees, then, the Maya who returned to British Honduras in the 19th century became incorporated into the colony as poor and dispossessed ethnic minorities. By the end of the 19th century, the ethnic pattern that remained largely intact throughout the 20th century was in place: Protestants largely of African descent, who spoke either English or Creole, lived in Belize Town; the Roman Catholic Maya and Mestizos spoke Spanish and lived chiefly in the north and west; and the Roman Catholic Garifuna who spoke English, Spanish, or Garifuna and settled on the southern coast.

=== Formal establishment of the colony, 1862–1871 ===
The forestry industry's control of land and its influence in colonial decision making hindered the development of agriculture and the diversification of the economy. In many parts of the Caribbean, large numbers of former slaves, some of whom had engaged in the cultivation and marketing of food crops, became landowners. British Honduras had vast areas of sparsely populated, unused land. Nevertheless, land ownership was controlled by a small European monopoly, thwarting the evolution of a Creole landowning class from the former slaves. Rather than the former slaves, it was the Garifuna, Maya and Mestizos who pioneered agriculture in 19th-century British Honduras. These groups either rented land or lived as squatters. However, the domination of the land by forestry interests continued to stifle agriculture and kept much of the population dependent on imported foods.

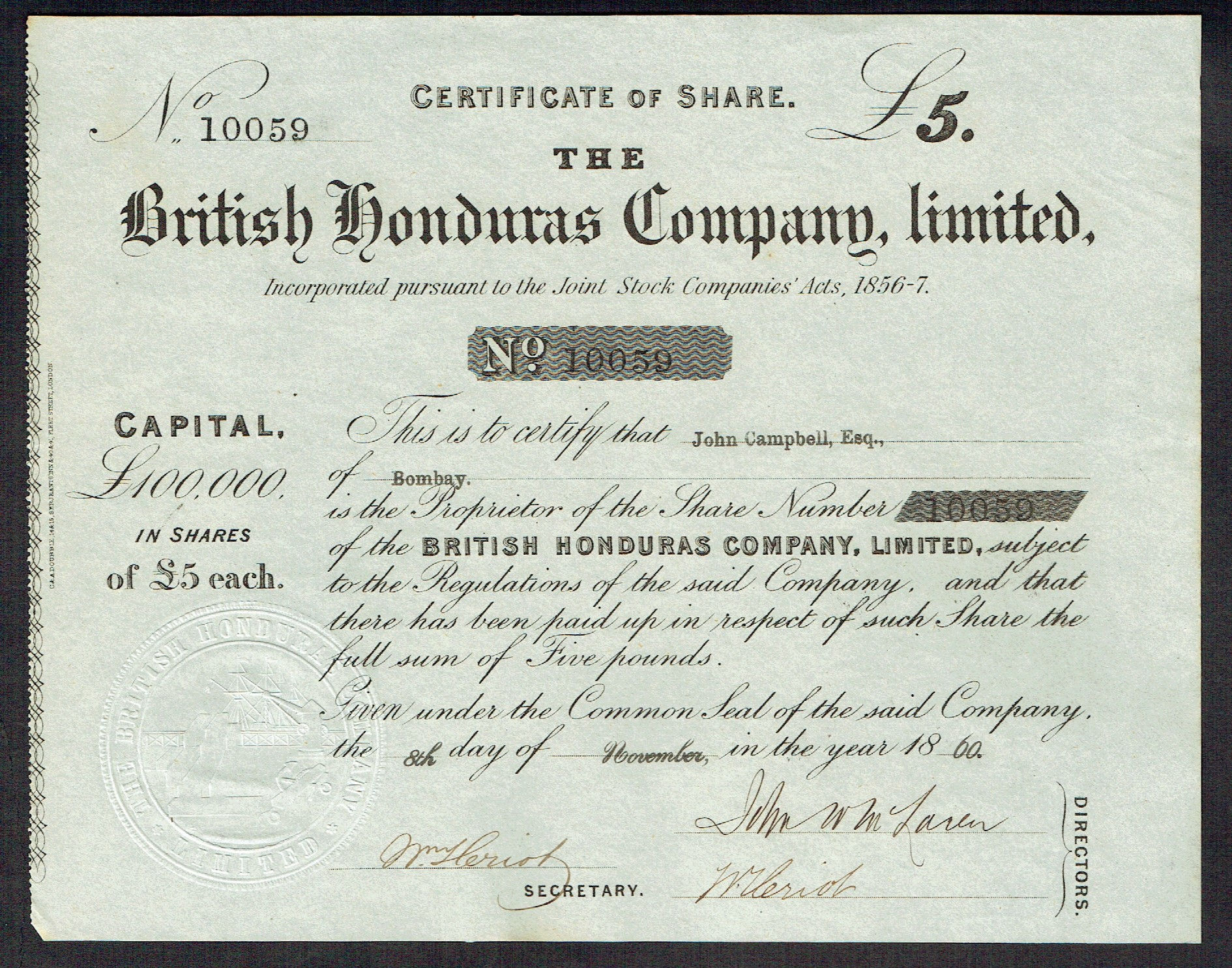
Share of the British Honduras Company Ltd., issued 8 November 1860

Landownership became even more consolidated during the economic depression of the mid-19th century. Exports of mahogany peaked at over 4 million linear metres in 1846 but fell to about 1.6 million linear meters in 1859 and 8,000 linear meters in 1870, the lowest level since the beginning of the century. Mahogany and logwood continued to account for over 80 percent of the total value of exports, but the price of these goods was so low that the economy was in a state of prolonged depression after the 1850s. Major results of this depression included the decline of the old settler class, the increasing consolidation of capital and the intensification of British landownership. The British Honduras Company emerged as the predominant landowner of the Crown colony. The firm originated in a partnership between one of the old settler families and a London merchant and was registered in 1859 as a limited company. The firm expanded, often at the expense of others who were forced to sell their land.

Largely as a result of the costly military expeditions against the Maya, the expenses of administering the new colony of British Honduras increased, and that at a time of severe depression in the economy. Large landowners and merchants dominated the Legislative Assembly, which controlled the colony's revenues and expenditures. Some of the landowners also had involvement in commerce, but their interest differed from those of the other merchants of Belize Town. The former group resisted the taxation of land and favoured an increase in import duties; the latter preferred the opposite. Moreover, the merchants in the town felt relatively secure from Mayan attacks and reluctant to contribute toward the protection of mahogany camps, whereas the landowners felt that they should not be required to pay taxes on lands given inadequate protection. These conflicting interests produced a stalemate in the Legislative Assembly, which failed to authorise the raising of sufficient revenue. Unable to agree among themselves, the members of the Legislative Assembly surrendered their political privileges and asked for the establishment of direct British rule in return for the greater security of Crown colony status. The new constitution was inaugurated in April 1871 and the Legislative Council became the new legislature.

=== Colonial order, 1871–1931 ===
Under the new constitution of 1871, the Lieutenant Governor and the Legislative Council, consisting of five ex-officio or "official" and four appointed or "unofficial" members, governed British Honduras. This constitutional change confirmed and completed a change in the locus and form of power in the colony's political economy that had evolved during the preceding half-century. The change moved power from the old settler oligarchy to the boardrooms of British companies and to the Colonial Office in London. In 1875, the British Honduras Company became the Belize Estate and Produce Company, a London-based business that owned about half of all the privately held land in the colony. The new company was the chief force in British Honduras's political economy for over a century. This concentration and centralisation of capital meant that the direction of the colony's economy was henceforth determined largely in London. It also signalled the eclipse of the old settler elite.

By about 1890, most commerce in British Honduras was in the hands of a clique of Scottish and German merchants, most of them newcomers. This clique encouraged consumption of imported goods and thus furthered British Honduras's dependence on Britain. The European minority exercised great influence in the colony's politics, partly because it was guaranteed representation on the wholly appointed Legislative Council. The manager of the Belize Estate and Produce Company, for example, was automatically a member of the council, while members of the emerging Creole elite were excluded from holding seats on the council. The Creoles requested in 1890 that some seats on the council be opened to election (as had occurred in Canada and New Zealand) in the hope of winning seats, but the Legislative Council refused. In 1892, the Governor appointed several Creole members, but whites remained the majority. On 11 December 1894, a crowd of 200–600 rioters rampaged throughout the Belize Town central business district in response to Sir Cornelius Alfred Moloney's rejection of a petition to improve working conditions. The crowd looted stores and freed a labour leader imprisoned in a police station before the riot eventually subsided.

A brief revival in the forestry industry took place early in the next century as new demands for forest products came from the United States. Exports of chicle, a gum taken from the sapodilla tree and used to make chewing gum, propped up the economy from the 1880s. Much of the gum was tapped in Mexican and Guatemalan forests by Mayan chicleros who had been recruited by labour contractors in British Honduras. A short-lived boom in the mahogany trade occurred around 1900 in response to growing demand for the wood in the United States, but the ruthless exploitation of the forests without any conservation or reforestation depleted resources. On 22 July 1919, a riot erupted in Belize Town, as a mob consisting of hundreds of rioters, many of them demobilised Belizean servicemen, protested racial discrimination and rising prices in the colony. Eventually, a contingent of ex-servicemen loyal to the colonial government subdued the riots, and order was restored. In the 1920s, the Colonial Office supported agitation for an elective council as long as the Governor had reserve powers to allow him to push through any measures he considered essential without the council's assent. But the council rejected these provisos, and the issue of restoring elections was postponed.

Despite the prevailing stagnation of the colony's economy and society during most of the century prior to the 1930s, seeds of change were being sown. The mahogany trade remained depressed, and efforts to develop plantation agriculture in several crops, including sugarcane, coffee, cocoa, cotton, bananas and coconuts failed. The introduction of tractors and bulldozers opened up new areas in the west and south in the 1920s, but this development led again to only a temporary revival. At this time, mahogany, cedar and chicle together accounted for 97 percent of forest production and 82 percent of the total value of exports. The economy, which was increasingly oriented toward trade with the United States, remained dependent and underdeveloped. Creoles, who were well-connected with businesses in the United States, challenged the traditional political-economic connection with Britain as trade with the United States intensified. Men such as Robert S. Turton, the Creole chicle buyer for Wrigley's, and Henry I. Melhado, whose merchant family dealt in illicit liquor during prohibition, became major political and economic figures. In 1927, Creole merchants and professionals replaced the representatives of British landowners, (except for the manager of the Belize Estate and Produce Company) on the Legislative Council. The participation of this Creole elite in the political process was evidence of emerging social changes that were largely concealed by economic stagnation. These changes accelerated with such force in the 1930s that they ushered in a new era of modern politics.

=== Genesis of modern politics, 1931–1954 ===
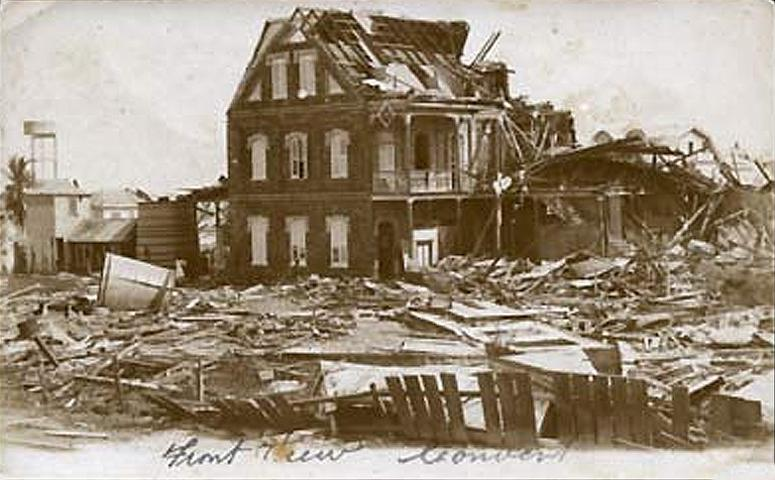
Destruction from the 1931 Belize hurricane

The Great Depression shattered the colony's economy, and unemployment increased rapidly. The Colonial Report for 1931 stated that "contracts for the purchase of mahogany and chicle, which form the mainstay of the Colony, practically ceased altogether, thereby throwing a large number of the woodcutters and chicle-gatherers out of work". On top of this economic disaster, the worst hurricane in the country's recent history demolished Belize Town on 10 September 1931, killing more than 1,000 people and destroying at least three-quarters of the housing. The British relief response was tardy and inadequate. The British government seized the opportunity to impose tighter control on the colony and endowed the Governor with reserve powers, or the power to enact laws in emergency situations without the consent of the Legislative Council. The Legislative Council resisted but eventually passed a resolution agreeing to give the Governor reserve powers to obtain disaster aid. Meanwhile, people in the town were making shelters out of the wreckage of their houses. The economy continued to decline in 1932 and 1933. The total value of imports and exports in the latter year was little more than one-fourth of what it had been in 1929.

The Belize Estate and Produce Company survived the depression years because of its special connections in British Honduras and London. Since 1875 various members of the Hoare family had been principal directors and maintained a controlling interest in the company. Sir Samuel Hoare, a shareholder and former director, had been a British cabinet member and a friend of Leo Amery, the British secretary of state for the colonies. In 1931, when the company was suffering from the aftereffects of the hurricane and the depression, family member Oliver V.G. Hoare contacted the Colonial Office to discuss the possibility of selling the company to buyers in the United States. The British government rescued the company by granting it an area of virgin mahogany forest and a loan of US$200,000 to erect a sawmill in Belize Town. When the government almost doubled the land tax, the large landowners refused to pay. The government accepted some virtually worthless land in lieu of taxes and in 1935 capitulated completely, reducing the tax to its former rate and annulling the landowners' arrears by making them retroactive to 1931. But small landowners had paid their taxes, often at a higher rate.

Robert Turton, the Creole millionaire who made his fortune from chicle exports, defeated C.H. Brown, the expatriate manager of the company, in the first elections for some of the Legislative Council seats in 1936. After the elections, the Governor promptly appointed Brown to the council, presumably to maintain the influence of what had for so long been the colony's chief business. But Brown's defeat by Turton, one of the company's chief local business rivals, marked the decline of old British enterprises in relation to the rising Creole entrepreneurs with their United States commercial connections.

Meanwhile, the Belize Estate and Produce Company drove Maya villagers from their homes in San Jose and Yalbac in the northwest and treated workers in mahogany camps almost like slaves. Investigators of labour conditions in the 1930s were appalled to discover that workers received rations of inferior flour and mess pork and tickets to be exchanged at the commissaries, in lieu of cash wages. As a result, workers and their families suffered from malnutrition and were continually in debt to their employers. The law governing labour contracts, the Masters and Servants Act of 1883, made it a criminal offence for a labourer to breach a contract. The offence was punishable by twenty-eight days of imprisonment with hard labour. In 1931 the Governor, Sir John Burdon, rejected proposals to legalise trade unions and to introduce a minimum wage and sickness insurance. The conditions, aggravated by rising unemployment and the disastrous hurricane, were responsible for severe hardship among the poor. The poor responded in 1934 with a series of demonstrations, strikes, petitions and riots that marked the beginning of modern politics and the independence movement.

==== Labour disturbances ====
Riots, strikes and rebellions had occurred before, during and after the period of slavery, but the events of the 1930s were modern labour disturbances in the sense that they gave rise to organisations with articulate industrial and political goals. A group calling itself the Unemployed Brigade marched through Belize Town on 14 February 1934, to present demands to the Governor and started a broad movement. Poor people, in desperation, turned to the Governor, who responded by creating a little relief work—stone-breaking for US$0.10 a day. The Governor also offered a daily ration of two kilograms of cooked rice at the prison gates. The leaders of the Unemployed Brigade gave up hope of further action and resigned.

The unemployed, demanding a cash dole, turned to Antonio Soberanis Gómez (1897–1975), who denounced the Unemployed Brigade's leaders as cowards. He said that he would continue fighting for the cause and that he was not afraid to die. In his most famous quote, he said, "I'd rather be a dead hero than a living coward". At a meeting on 16 March 1934, he took over the movement, which became the Labourers and Unemployed Association (LUA). For the next few weeks, Soberanis and his colleagues in the LUA attacked the Governor and his officials, the rich merchants, and the Belize Estate and Produce Company at biweekly meetings attended by 600 to 800 people. The workers demanded relief and a minimum wage. They couched their demands in broad moral and political terms that began to define and develop a new nationalistic and democratic political culture.

Soberanis was jailed under a new sedition law in 1935. Still, the labour agitation achieved a great deal. Of most immediate importance was the creation of relief work by a Governor who saw it as a way to avoid civil disturbances. Workers built more than 300 kilometres of roads. The Governor also pressed for a semi-representative government. But when the new constitution was passed in April 1935, it included the restrictive franchise demanded by the appointed majority of the Legislative Council, which had no interest in furthering democracy. High voter-eligibility standards for property and income limited the electorate to the wealthiest 2 percent of the population. Poor people, therefore, could not vote; they could only support members of the Creole middle classes that opposed big-business candidates. The Citizens' Political Party and the LUA endorsed Robert Turton and Arthur Balderamos, a Creole lawyer, who formed the chief opposition in the new council of 1936. Working-class agitation continued, and in 1939 all six seats on the Belize Town Board (the voting requirements allowed for a more representative electorate) went to middle-class Creoles who appeared more sympathetic to labour.

The greatest achievements of the agitation of the 1930s were the labour reforms passed between 1941 and 1943. Trade unions were legalised in 1941, but the laws did not require employers to recognise these unions. Furthermore, the penal clauses of the old Masters and Servants Act rendered the new rights ineffectual. Employers among the unofficial members at the Legislative Council defeated a bill to repeal these penal clauses in August 1941, but the Employers and Workers Bill passed on 27 April 1943, finally removed breach-of-labour-contract from the criminal code and enabled British Honduras's infant trade unions to pursue the struggle for improving labour conditions. The General Workers' Union (GWU), registered in 1943, quickly expanded into a nationwide organisation and provided crucial support for the nationalist movement that took off with the formation of the People's United Party (PUP) in 1950. The 1930s were therefore the crucible of modern Belizean politics. It was a decade during which the old phenomena of exploitative labour conditions and authoritarian colonial and industrial relations began to give way to new labour and political processes and institutions.

The same period saw an expansion in voter eligibility. Between 1939 and 1954, less than 2 percent of the population elected six members in the Legislative Council of thirteen members. In 1945 only 822 voters were registered in a population of over 63,000. The proportion of voters increased slightly in 1945, partly because the minimum age for women voters was reduced from thirty to twenty-one years. The devaluation of the British Honduras dollar in 1949 effectively reduced the property and income voter-eligibility standards. Finally, in 1954 British Honduras achieved suffrage for all literate adults as a result of the emerging independence movement. This development was a prelude to the process of constitutional decolonisation.

==== Independence movement ====
The origins of the independence movement also lay in the 1930s and 1940s. Three groups played important roles in the colony's politics during this period. One group consisted of working-class individuals and emphasised labour issues. This group originated with Soberanis's LUA between 1934 and 1937 and continued through the GWU. The second group, a radical nationalist movement, emerged during World War II. Its leaders came from the LUA and the local branch of Marcus Garvey's Universal Negro Improvement Association. The group called itself variously the British Honduras Independent Labour Party, the People's Republican Party and the People's National Committee. The third group consisted of people such as the Christian Social Action Group (CSAG) who engaged in electoral politics within the narrow limits defined by the constitution and whose goals included a "Natives First" campaign and an extension of the franchise to elect a more representative government.

In 1947 a group of graduates of the elite Catholic Saint John's College formed the CSAG and won control of the Belize City Council. One member of this group, George Cadle Price, topped the polls in the 1947 election when he opposed immigration schemes and import controls and rode a wave of feeling against a British proposal for a federation of its colonies in the Caribbean. Price was an eclectic and pragmatic politician whose ideological position was often obscured under a cloak of religious values and quotations. He remained the predominant politician in the country from the early 1950s until his retirement in 1996. The CSAG also started a newspaper, the Belize Billboard edited by Philip Goldson and Leigh Richardson.

The event that precipitated Price's political career and the formation of the PUP, was the devaluation of the British Honduras dollar on 31 December 1949. In September 1949, the British government devalued the British pound sterling. In spite of repeated denials by the Governor that the British Honduras dollar would be devalued to maintain the old exchange rate with the British pound, devaluation was nevertheless effected by the Governor, using his reserve powers in defiance of the Legislative Council. The Governor's action angered the nationalists because it reflected the limits of the legislature and revealed the extent of the colonial administration's power. The devaluation enraged labour because it protected the interests of the big transnationals, such as the Belize Estate and Produce Company, whose trade in British pounds would have suffered without devaluation while it subjected British Honduras's working class, already experiencing widespread unemployment and poverty, to higher prices for goods—especially food—imported from the United States. Devaluation thus united labour, nationalists and the Creole middle classes in opposition to the colonial administration. On the night that the Governor declared the devaluation, the People's Committee was formed and the nascent independence movement suddenly matured.

Before the end of January 1950, the GWU and the People's Committee were holding joint public meetings and discussing issues such as devaluation, labour legislation, the proposed West Indies Federation, and constitutional reform. The GWU was the only mass organisation of working people, so the early success of the independence movement would have been impossible without the support of this union. In fact, the GWU president, Clifford Betson was one of the original members of the People's Committee. On 28 April 1950, the middle-class members of the People's Committee (formerly members of the CSAG) took over the leadership of the union and gave Betson the dubious honorific title of "patriarch of the union". On 29 September 1950, the People's Committee was dissolved and the People's United Party (PUP) formed in its place.

==== Rise of the PUP ====
Between 1950 and 1954, the People's United Party consolidated its organisation, established its popular base, and articulated its primary demands. Belize Billboard editors Philip Goldson and Leigh Richardson were prominent members of the PUP and gave the party their full support through anti-colonial editorials. A year later, George Price, the secretary of the PUP, became vice-president of the GWU. The political leaders took control of the union to use its strength, and in turn the union movement declined as it became increasingly dependent upon politicians in the 1950s.

The PUP concentrated on agitating for constitutional reforms, including universal adult suffrage without a literacy test, an all- elected Legislative Council, an Executive Council chosen by the leader of the majority party in the legislature, the introduction of a ministerial system, and the abolition of the Governor's reserve powers. In short, PUP pushed for representative and responsible government. The colonial administration, alarmed by the growing support for the PUP, retaliated by attacking two of the party's chief public platforms. In July 1951, the Governor dissolved the Belize City Council on the pretext that it had shown disloyalty by refusing to display a picture of King George VI. Then, in October, the Governor charged Belize Billboard publishers and owners, including Richardson and Goldson, with sedition. The Governor jailed them for twelve months with hard labour. Soon after, PUP leader John Smith resigned because the party would not agree to fly the British flag at public meetings. The removal of three of four chief leaders was a blow to the party, but the events left Price in a powerful position. In 1952 he comfortably topped the polls in Belize City Council elections. Within just two years, despite persecution and division, the PUP had become a powerful political force, and George Price had clearly become the party's leader.

The colonial administration and the National Party, which consisted of loyalist members of the Legislative Council, portrayed the PUP as pro-Guatemalan and even communist. The leaders of the PUP, however, perceived British Honduras as belonging to neither Britain nor Guatemala. The Governor and the National Party failed in their attempts to discredit the PUP on the issue of its contacts with Guatemala, which was then ruled by the democratic, reformist government of president Jacobo Arbenz. When voters went to the polls on 28 April 1954, in the first election under universal literate adult suffrage, the main issue was clearly colonialism—a vote for the PUP was a vote in favour of self-government. Almost 70 percent of the electorate voted. The PUP gained 66.3 percent of the vote and won eight of the nine elected seats in the new Legislative Assembly. Further constitutional reform was unequivocally on the agenda.

=== Decolonisation and the border dispute with Guatemala ===
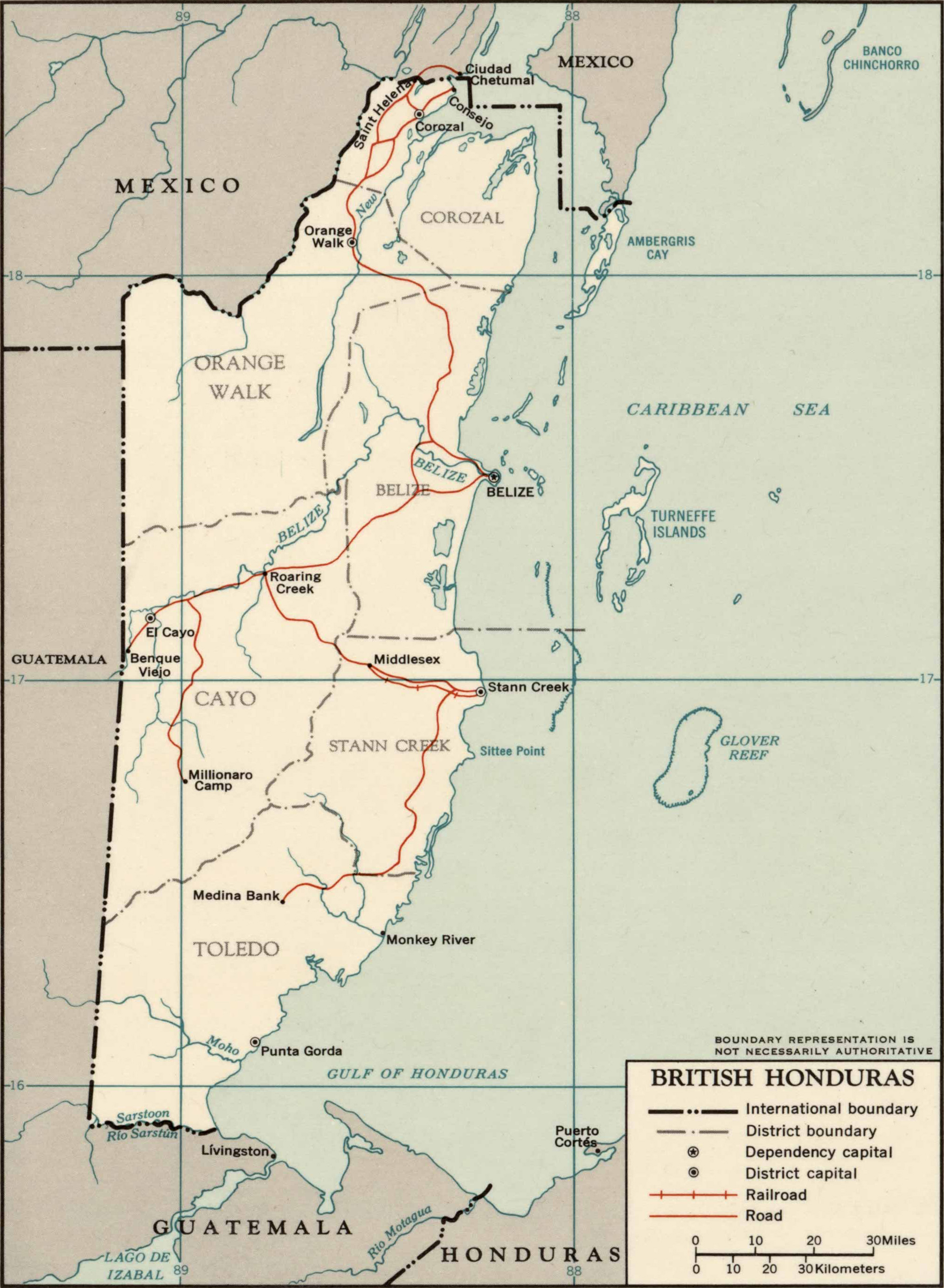
1965 map of British Honduras

British Honduras faced two obstacles to independence: British reluctance until the early 1960s to allow citizens to govern themselves, and Guatemala's complete intransigence over its long-standing claim to the entire territory. By 1961, the United Kingdom was willing to let the colony become independent and from 1964 controlled only defence, foreign affairs, internal security, and the terms and conditions of the public service. On 1 June 1973, the colony's name was changed to Belize in anticipation of independence. The stalemate in the protracted negotiations between the UK and Guatemala over the future status of Belize led Belizeans after 1975 to seek the international community's assistance in resolving issues associated with independence. Even after Belize became independent in 1981, however, the territorial dispute remained unsettled.

The territorial dispute's origins lay in the 18th-century treaties in which Great Britain acceded to Spain's assertion of sovereignty while British settlers continued to occupy the sparsely settled and ill-defined area. The 1786 Convention of London, which affirmed Spanish sovereignty was never renegotiated, but Spain never attempted to reclaim the area after 1798.

At the centre of Guatemala's oldest claim was the 1859 treaty between the United Kingdom and Guatemala. From Britain's viewpoint, this treaty merely settled the boundaries of an area already under British dominion. Guatemala had an alternative view that this agreement stated that Guatemala would give up its territorial claims only under certain conditions, including the construction of a road from Guatemala to the Caribbean coast. The UK never built the road, and Guatemala said it would repudiate the treaty in 1884 but never followed up on the threat.

The dispute appeared to have been forgotten until the 1930s when the government of General Jorge Ubico claimed that the treaty was invalid because the road had not been constructed. Britain argued that because neither the short-lived Central American Federation (1821–1839) nor Guatemala had ever exercised any authority in the area or even protested the British presence in the 19th century, British Honduras was clearly under British sovereignty. In its constitution of 1945, however, Guatemala stated that British Honduras was the twenty-third department of Guatemala.

In February 1948, Guatemala threatened to invade and forcibly annex the territory, and the British responded by deploying two companies from 2nd Battalion Gloucestershire Regiment. Since 1954, a succession of military and right-wing governments in Guatemala frequently whipped up nationalist sentiment, with incursions in 1957 and 1958.

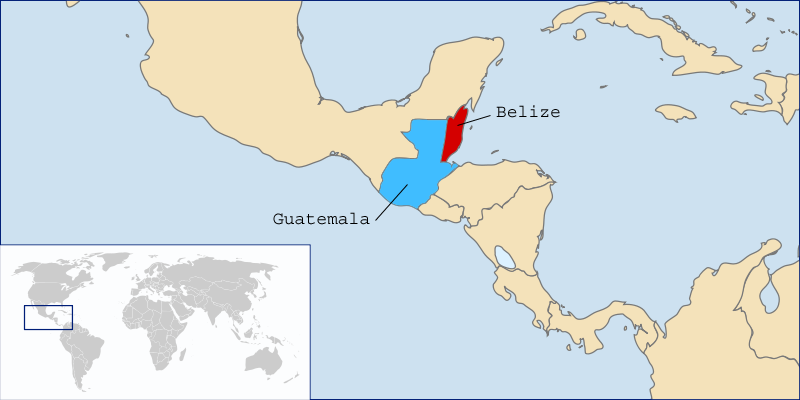
Belize and Guatemala

Negotiations between Britain and Guatemala began again in 1961, but the elected representatives of British Honduras had no voice in these talks. As a result, in 1965 the United States President Lyndon Johnson agreed to mediate and proposed a draft treaty that gave Guatemala control over the newly independent country in areas including internal security, defence and external affairs. All parties in British Honduras, however, denounced the proposals.

A series of meetings, begun in 1969, ended abruptly in 1972 when tensions flared over a possible Guatemalan invasion. Talks resumed in 1973, but broke off again in 1975 when tensions flared once more. Between 1975 and 1981, the Belizean and British governments, frustrated at dealing with the military-dominated regimes in Guatemala, began to state their case for self-determination at international forums such as a meeting of the heads of Commonwealth of Nations governments in Jamaica, the conference of ministers of the Nonaligned Movement in Peru, and at meetings of the United Nations (UN).

The support of the Nonaligned Movement proved crucial and assured success at the UN. Latin American governments initially supported Guatemala, however Cuba, Mexico, Panama and Nicaragua later declared unequivocal support for an independent Belize. Finally, in November 1980, with Guatemala completely isolated, the UN passed a resolution that demanded the independence of Belize, with all its territory intact, before the next session of the UN in 1981.

A last attempt was made to reach an agreement with Guatemala prior to the independence of Belize and a proposal, called the Heads of Agreement, was initialled on 11 March 1981. However, the Guatemalan government refused to ratify the agreement and withdrew from the negotiations, and the opposition in Belize engaged in violent demonstrations against it. With the prospect of independence celebrations in the offing, the opposition's morale fell and independence came to Belize on 21 September 1981, without an agreement with Guatemala.

== Government ==
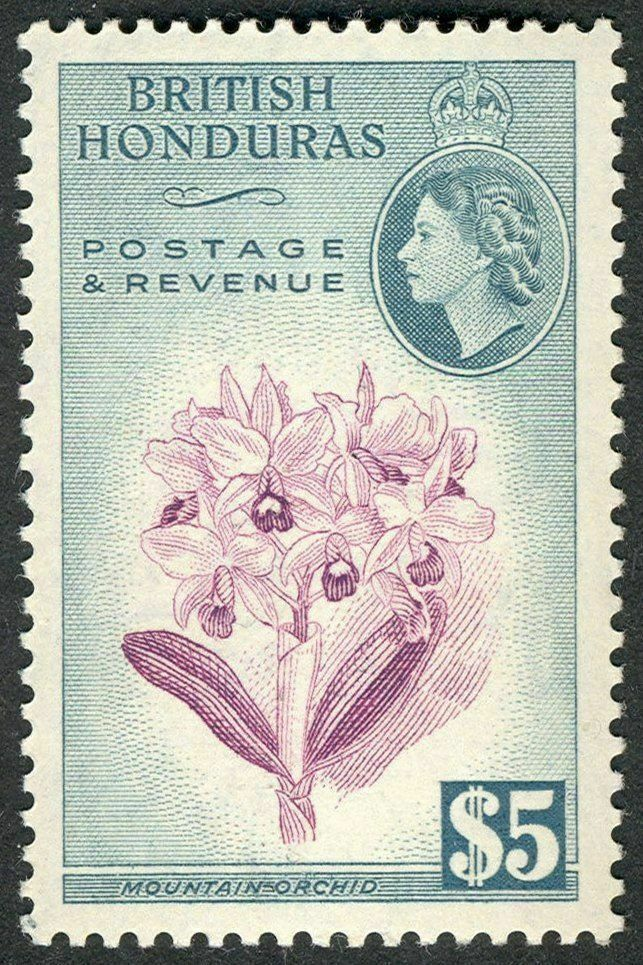
Queen Elizabeth II on $5-British Honduras stamp, 1953

Before 1884, the colonial administration of British Honduras was rather haphazard. In the early days, the colonists governed themselves under a public meeting system, similar to the town meeting system used in New England. A set of regulations called "Burnaby's Code" was adopted in 1765, which continued in force until 1840 when an executive council was created. That same year, the colony formally became known as British Honduras, although it was also referred to as "the Belize". In 1853, the public meeting system was abandoned in favour of a legislative assembly, part of which was elected by a restricted franchise. The assembly was presided over by the British superintendent, an office created in 1784.

From 1749 until 1884, British Honduras was governed as a dependency of the British colony of Jamaica. Upon its designation as a Crown colony in 1871, a Lieutenant Governor under the Governor of Jamaica replaced the superintendent, and a nominated legislative council replaced the legislative assembly. When the colony was finally severed from the administration of Jamaica in 1884, it gained its own Governor.

In 1935, legislative franchise was reintroduced with a lower income qualification. Universal adult franchise was adopted in 1954, and a majority of seats in the legislature were made elective. A ministerial system was introduced in 1961, and the colony achieved self-government status in 1964.

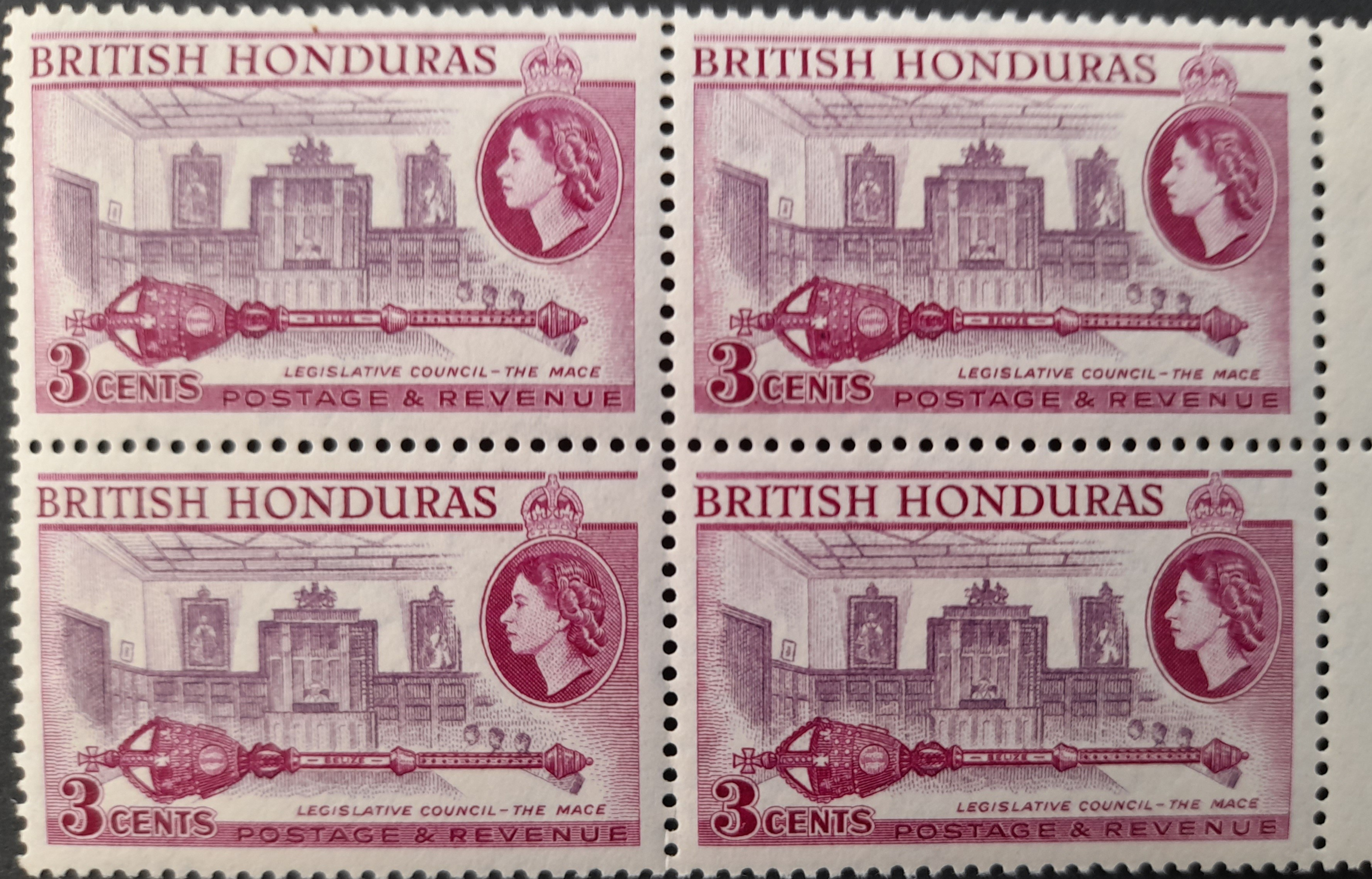
Legislative Council 3 Cents issue British Honduras Queen Elizabeth II stamps, figures sat at a table with Mace. Mint block of four, right hand margin.

== Economy ==
Forestry dominated the economy of British Honduras. Initially, the focus was upon logwood, which was used in dye manufacture. Falling prices for logwood in the 1770s led to a shift toward logging mahogany, which would dominate the economy until the mid-20th century. As the logging of mahogany was far more labour-intensive, this also led to a significant increase of the importation of African slaves to the colony, mainly from Britain's Caribbean colonies. Due largely to extremely harsh working conditions, the colony experienced four slave revolts, the first in 1765 and the last in 1820. Slavery was finally abolished in 1838. Exports of mahogany continued as an economic mainstay, as commercial agriculture remained unprofitable due to unfavourable colonial tax policies and trade restrictions. Colonial officials provided incentives during the 1860s that resulted in a large influx of Americans from the Southern United States, especially Louisiana, during and after the American Civil War. The Confederate settlements in British Honduras introduced large-scale sugar production to the colony and proved that it could be profitable where others had previously failed.

The lack of diversification in the economy left the colony very susceptible to swings in the mahogany market. The Great Depression of the 1930s and an especially destructive hurricane in 1931, further depressed the economy and already low living conditions. From 1914 on, the forestry industry was in steady decline, except for a brief revival during World War II (1939–1945). In the 1950s agriculture finally became a dominant part of economy, and in the 1970s fishing became significant. Land reform after World War II aided this expansion of the economy.

== Demographics ==
By the time of the colony's 1790 census, three-quarters of the population of British Honduras were Creole people". They were the ancestors of the original Belizean-Creole population, who were, and still are, the biological offspring of African men and enslaved African women. The original Belizean-Creole people consisted mainly of west African slaves and descendants.

The abolition of the slave trade in 1807, high death rates and low birth rates substantially reduced the ethnic African portion of the population. The white portion of the population returned to Europe and imported other whites to live in Belize. The largest portion of the population, the creole people, now comprise about 45% of modern Belize. The Mayans are still present in Belize and comprise around 11% of the population.

The population of the colony was always fairly small. In 1790 it was around 4,000. In 1856 it was estimated to be 20,000. By 1931 this figure grew to just over 50,000, and in 1946 to just under 60,000. However, by 1970 the population doubled to just under 120,000. On the eve of independence in 1980, the population stood at over 145,000.

== See also ==
- List of colonial governors and administrators of British Honduras
- Attorney General of British Honduras
- Chief Justice of British Honduras
